= Johannes Browallius =

The Right Reverend Johannes Browallius
- Bishop of Turku
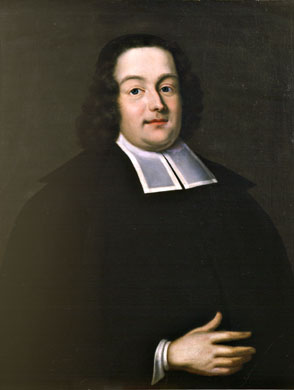
- Oil on canvas portrait of Johannes Browallius by Margareta Capsia, Helsinki University Museum, 1750
- Church: Church of Sweden
- Diocese: Turku
- Appointed: 3 March 1749
- In office: 1749–1755
- Predecessor: Jonas Fahlenius
- Successor: Karl Fredrik Mennander

Orders
- Ordination: 1746
- Consecration: 1749 by Henric Benzelius

Personal details
- Born: 30 August 1707 Västerås, Swedish Empire
- Died: 25 July 1755 (aged 47) Turku, Finland
- Buried: Turku Cathedral
- Denomination: Lutheran
- Parents: Anders Browallius & Katarina Sigtunia
- Spouse: Elisabet Ehrenholm

Johannes Browallius (30 August 1707 – 25 July 1755), also called John Browall, was a Finnish and Swedish Lutheran theologian, physicist, botanist and at one time friend of Swedish taxonomist Carl Linnaeus.

== Career ==
He was a professor of physics from 1737 to 1746, Professor of Theology 1746–49 and was the Bishop of Turku, then a diocese of the Church of Sweden, and Vice-Chancellor of The Royal Academy of Turku from 1749 until his death in 1755.

He was an elected a member of the Royal Swedish Academy of Sciences in 1740.

== Botanical activities ==
In 1735 seeds of a plant collected in Panama by Robert Millar were donated to Philip Miller of the Chelsea Physic Garden in London. The plants were grown on and forwarded to the Royal Society but with the name Dalea. This plant was named Browallia (Species Plantarum 2: 631. 1753 [1 May 1753]; Genera Plantarum ed. 5, 1754) by the famous plant taxonomist Carl Linnaeus in honour of his fellow countryman and botanical colleague. Linnaeus's principles of botanical nomenclature were first expounded in Fundamenta Botanica of 1736 and these were later elaborated, with numerous examples, in his Critica Botanica of 1737. The book was published in Germany when Linnaeus was 29 and the title page carries a discursus by Johannes Browall. The friendship was not to last. Coombes notes "Browallia demissa (weak). Renamed by Linnaeus from B. elata (tall) after falling out with Browall."

Browall had advised the young Linnaeus to finish his studies abroad, then marry a rich girl – even though he was already engaged to Sara Lisa Moraea. Linnaeus did, indeed, spend the winter of 1737–1738 in Leiden, travelling on to France. While abroad, he was sent news that "his best friend B." had taken advantage of his absence to court Sara Lisa Moraea and had almost succeeded in persuading her that her fiancé would never return to Sweden. However, the bishop's suit failed; Sara Lisa and Linnaeus were married in 1739. The entry under Browallia grandiflora in Curtis’s Botanical Magazine of 1831 reports:

The intimacy and subsequent rupture between Browall and Linnaeus were commemorated by the latter in the specific appellations which he bestowed on the only three individuals of the genus then known. B. elata expresses the degree of their union; B. demissa its cessation; while the ambiguous name of a third species, B. alienata, while it intimates the uncertain characteristics of the plant, implies the subsequent difference between the two parties.

—

== Publications ==
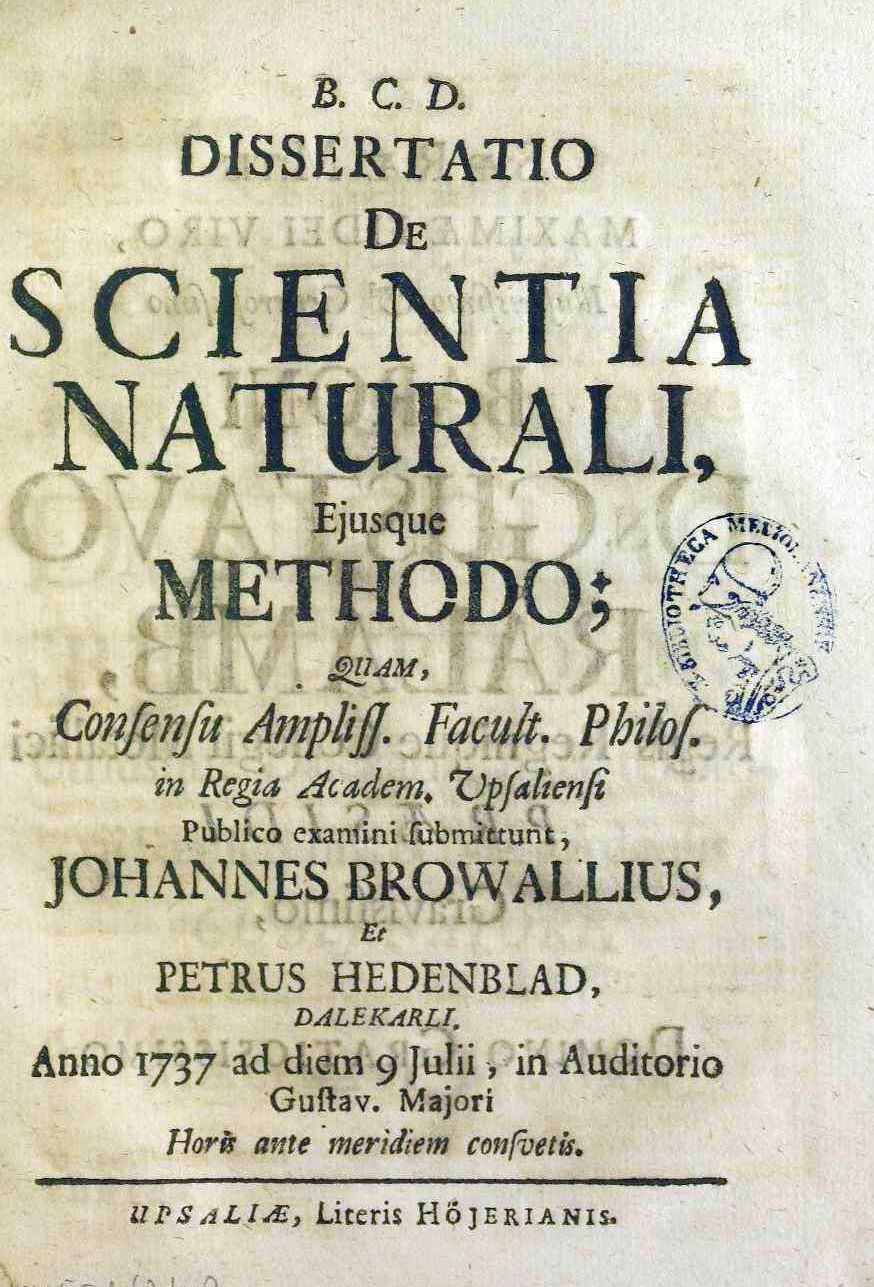
De scientia naturali, eiusque methodo, 1737

- De scientia naturali, eiusque methodo (in Latin). Uppsala: Ludvig Decreaux. 1737.

== See also ==
- List of bishops of Turku

Religious titles
Preceded by Jonas Fahlenius	Bishop of Turku; 1748 – 1755	Succeeded by Carl Fredrik Mennander
