= Jonas Fahlenius =

Bishop of Turku from 1734 to 1746

The Right Reverend Jonas Fahlenius
- Bishop of Turku
- Church: Church of Sweden
- Diocese: Turku
- Appointed: 18 March 1734
- In office: 1734–1746
- Predecessor: Lars Tammelin
- Successor: Johannes Browallius

Orders
- Consecration: 1734 by Johannes Steuchius

Personal details
- Born: 30 October 1674 Falun, Swedish Empire
- Died: 11 October 1748 (aged 73) Turku, Swedish Empire (Present-day Finland)
- Buried: Turku Cathedral
- Denomination: Lutheran
- Parents: Niklas Håkansson Fahlenius & Brita Jonasdotter Fahlberg
- Spouse: Sara Charlotta Teppati

Jonas Fahlenius (30 October 1674 - 11 October 1748) was a Swedish philosopher, theologian and Bishop of Turku from 1734 until 1746.

== Biography ==
Fahlenius was born on 30 October 1674 in Falun in the Swedish Empire, the son of a priest and teacher Niklas Håkansson Fahlenius and his wife Brita Jonasdotter Fahlberg. After basic education at Falun Trivial School, in 1695 he commenced studies at Uppsala University from where he graduated with his Masters in 1707. In 1712 he became an assistant professor of theology in Uppsala University. By royal decree in 1721, he became the Professor of Logic and Metaphysics at the Royal Academy of Turku, from where he also achieved his Doctor of Theology in 1732.

On 18 March 1734 he was appointed Bishop of Turku and was consecrated some time later that year by Archbishop Johannes Steuchius. He resigned as Bishop of Turku in 1746 after he suffered a stroke. Fahlenius married twice, but only had children from the second marriage, with Sara Charlotta Teppati, daughter of Carl Teppati and Sidonia Stiernstedt. One of his daughters was the mother of Abraham Niclas Edelcrantz, poet and inventor. Fahlenius is buried in Turku Cathedral along with his second wife and two of their children.

== See also ==
- List of bishops of Turku

Religious titles
Preceded by Lars Tammelin	Bishop of Turku; 1734 — 1746	Succeeded by Johannes Browallius
