= Herman Witte (bishop) =

Finnish Lutheran bishop

The Right Reverend Herman Witte
- Bishop of Turku
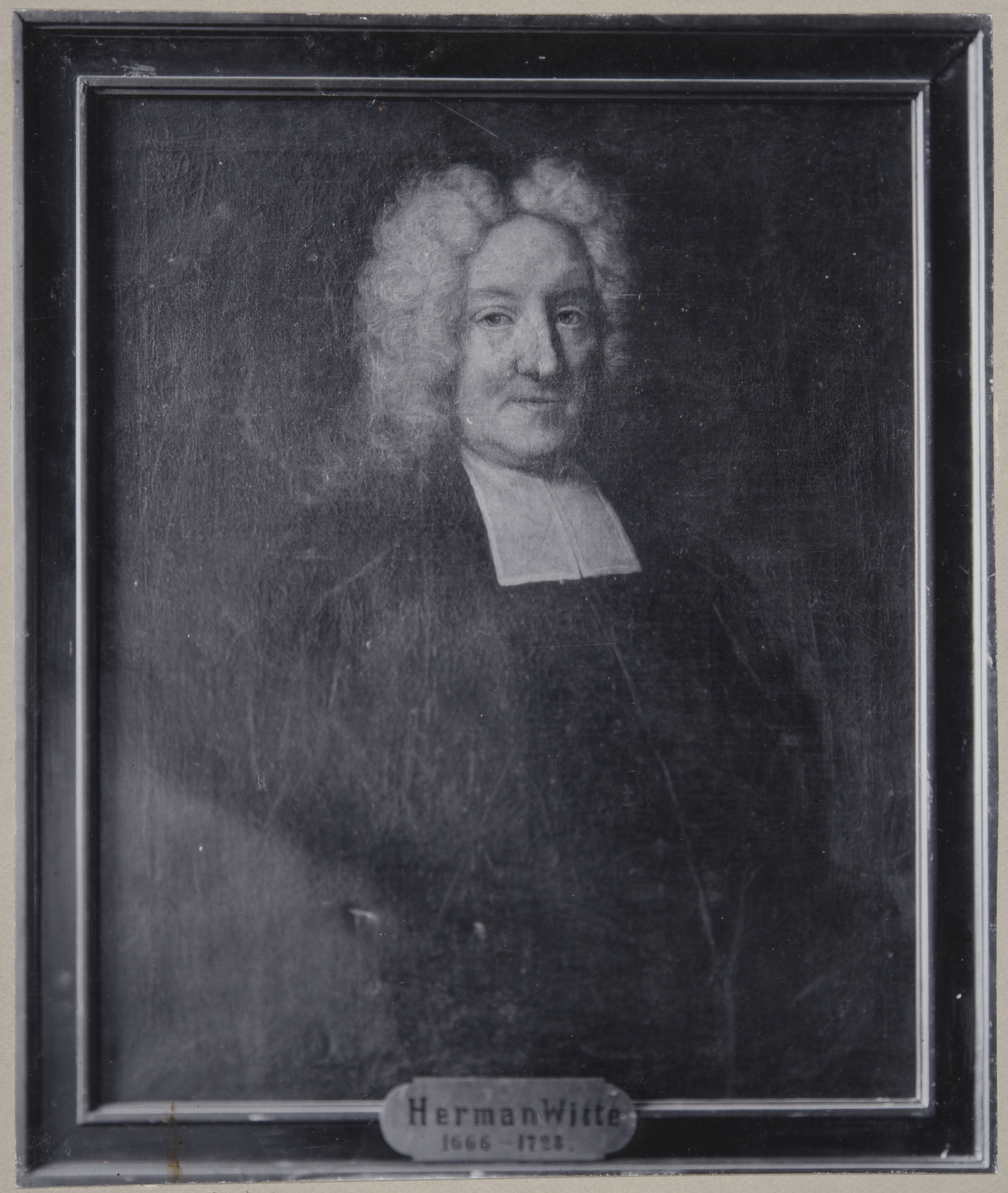
- Church: Church of Sweden
- Diocese: Turku
- Appointed: 16 September 1721
- In office: 1721–1728
- Predecessor: Johannes Gezelius the younger
- Successor: Lars Tammelin
- Previous post: Superintendent of Saaremaa(1707-1710)

Orders
- Consecration: 8 October 1721 by Mathias Steuchius

Personal details
- Born: 7 December 1666 Riga, Swedish Empire
- Died: 24 March 1728 (aged 61) Turku, Swedish Empire (Present-day Finland)
- Buried: Turku Cathedral
- Denomination: Lutheran
- Parents: Verner Witte & Hedvig von Roloff
- Spouse: Catarina Margareta Wittmack
- Children: 3

Herman Witte (7 December 1666 — 24 March 1728) was the Bishop of Turku from 1721 to 1728.

== Biography ==
Witte was born on 7 December 1666 in Daugavgrīva, Riga, in what was the Swedish Empire and is present-day Latvia. He was educated at the Lyceum in Riga between 1682 and 1688 under the tutorship of Johann Uppendorff. He then studied at the University of Wittenberg, and then in September 1691, was appointed an assistant professor in the Faculty of Philosophy. In 1695, he became the vicar of Stettin in present-day Poland. On 11 July 1707, he was appointed the superintendent of Saaremaa (present-day Estonia). After Sweden lost the Great Northern War of the Baltic States, Witte moved to Sweden in 1710. In February 1710, Witte appealed to the National Council for a post in Sweden and the Council initially decided to appoint him to the vacant bishopric of Växjö. However, the decision to appoint the German-born Witte, who had insufficient knowledge of Swedish, raised strong oppositions and the Council withdrew its decision. Nonetheless, Witte managed to become the German-speaking chaplain of Ulrika Eleonora.

In 1721, he was appointed Bishop of Turku. Archbishop Mathias Steuchius consecrate him bishop in Uppsala Cathedral on 8 October 1721. He firmly resisted Pietism and pursued purity. As bishop, he frequently inspected the congregations and closely monitored the school system and examined priests and schoolteachers to make sure they were performing their teaching duties in a proper manner. Witte was also appointed prosecutor at the University of Turku and worked to re-open the Royal Academy of Turku, which happened in 1722. He died in Turku on 28 March 1728.

== See also ==
- List of bishops of Turku

Religious titles
Preceded by Johannes Gezelius the younger	Bishop of Turku; 1721 — 1728	Succeeded by Lars Tammelin
