= Lars Tammelin =

Bishop of Turku from 1728 to 1733

The Right Reverend Lars Tammelin
- Bishop of Turku
- Church: Church of Sweden
- Diocese: Turku
- Appointed: 11 December 1728
- In office: 1728–1733
- Predecessor: Herman Witte
- Successor: Jonas Fahlenius

Orders
- Consecration: January 1729 by Mathias Steuchius

Personal details
- Born: 2 May 1669 Turku, Swedish Empire (Present-day Finland)
- Died: 2 July 1733 (aged 66) Turku, Swedish Empire (Present-day Finland)
- Buried: Turku Cathedral
- Denomination: Lutheran
- Parents: Gabriel Larsson Tammelinus and Anna Eriksdotter Pihl
- Spouse: Margareta Pedersdotter Hahn
- Children: 11

Lars Tammelin (2 May 1669 – 2 July 1733) also known as Laurentius Gabrielis Tammelinus was a Finnish mathematician and prelate who was the Bishop of Turku from 1728 to 1733.

== Biography ==
Tammelin was born on 2 May 1669 in Turku in the Swedish Empire, the son of Gabriel Larsson Tammelinus and Anna Eriksdotter Pihl. He began his studies in Turku and was enrolled at the academy in Turku in 1683. In 1698 he became a professor of mathematics at the Royal Academy of Turku. In August of the following year, he undertook a study trip through Denmark, Germany and the Netherlands where he enrolled at Leiden University on 27 November 1698. He studied under the Cartesian mathematician and astronomer Burchard de Volder, and returned to Finland in the autumn term of 1699.

In 1706 he was ordained priest and in 1717 he became vicar of Västerfärnebo. In 1728 he was appointed Bishop of Turku. He published the first Finnish calendars between 1705 and 1727.

== See also ==
- List of bishops of Turku

Religious titles
| Preceded by Herman Witte | Bishop of Turku; 1728 — 1733 | Succeeded by Jonas Fahlenius |
