= Johannes Terserus =

Finnish bishop

The Right Reverend Johannes Elai Terserus
- Bishop of Linköping
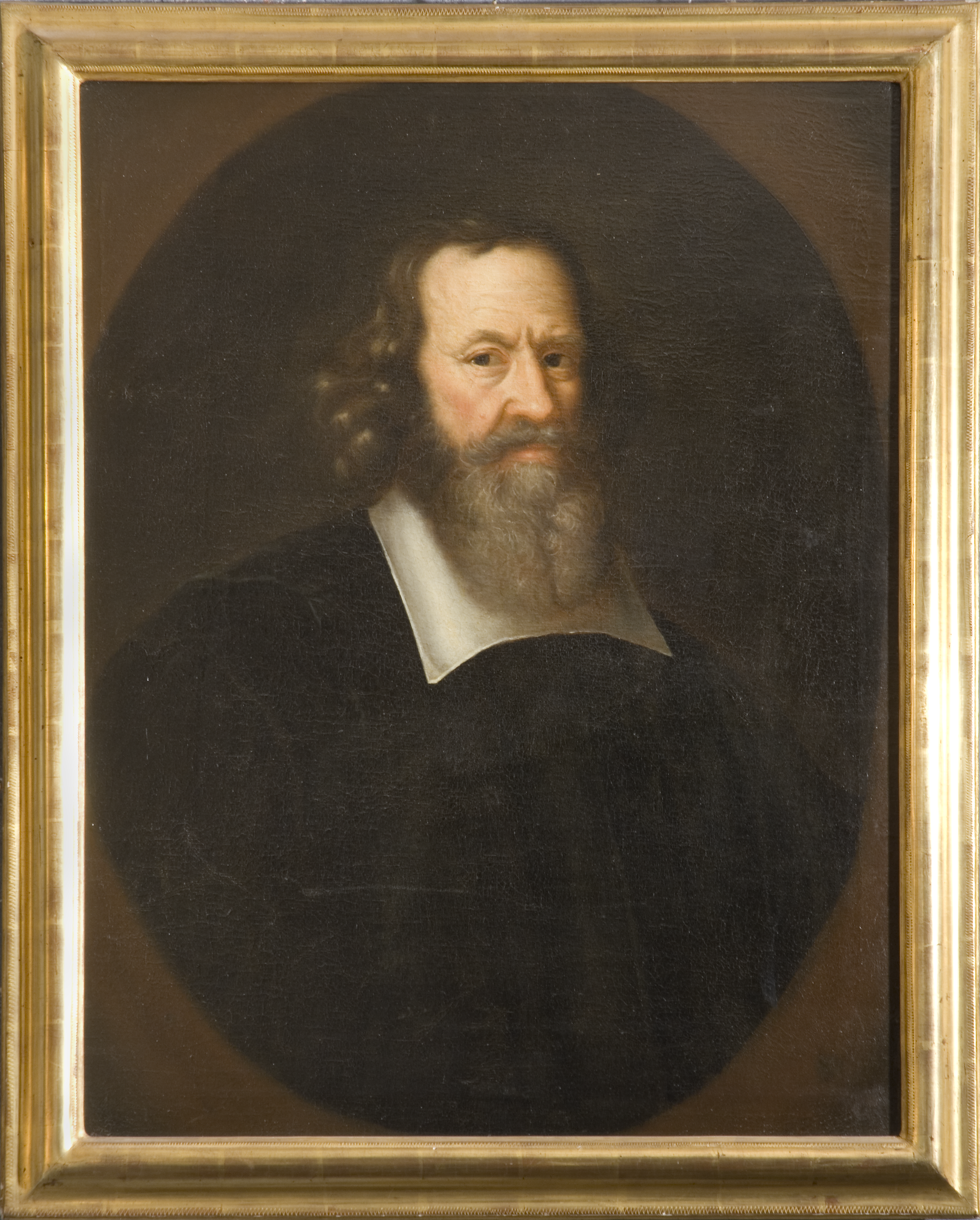
- Church: Church of Sweden
- Diocese: Linköping
- In office: 1671–1678
- Predecessor: Samuel Enander
- Successor: Olov Svebilius
- Previous posts: Bishop of Turku (1658-1664)

Orders
- Ordination: 1631
- Consecration: 1658

Personal details
- Born: April 1605 Leksand, Kingdom of Sweden
- Died: 11 April 1678 (aged 72–73) Söderköping, Kingdom of Sweden
- Buried: Linköping Cathedral
- Denomination: Lutheran
- Parents: Elaus Ingelberti Terserus & Anna Danielsdotter Svinhufvud
- Spouse: Elisabet Troilia; Maria Grubb
- Children: 10

Johannes Elai Terserus (April 1605 – 11 April 1678) was a Swedish prelate and theologian who served as the Bishop of Turku from 1658 to 1664 and then Bishop of Linköping between 1671 and 1678.

== Early life ==
Johannes Elai Terserus was born in Leksand where his father, Elaus Ingelberti Terserus, was a vicar. His mother was Anna Danielsdotter Svinhufvud. At the age of four, Terserus lost his mother, and his father married Margareta Bure, the so-called Stormor i Dalom. When he was twelve years old, he also lost his father, but was cared for by his stepmother and her later husband, Uno Troilius.

== Education and career ==
Terserus was sent to study in Västerås, where Bishop Johannes Rudbeckius took a special interest in his unusual statute and diligence, and whom he then accompanied on a visitation trip to Livland. He commenced studies in Uppsala in 1628 and ordained priest in 1631. In 1632 he became a lecturer in Greek in Västerås and the following year, with the support of Carl Gyllenhielm, Johan Banér and Axel Oxenstierna, eh embarked on a study trip during which he visited the leading academies in Germany, France, England and the Netherlands. He returned to Sweden in 1637 and resumed his position as a lecturer and also became the principal of an upper secondary school and notary in the chapter of the court. In 1639 he was awarded the Master of Philosophy with first honors from Uppsala. That same year, he also became a theology lecturer in Västerås.

In 1640 he was appointed as third theology professor at the Royal Academy of Turku and served as the university's rector in 1645. In 1647, during his stay in Stockholm, he taught Hebrew to Queen Kristina. In 1648 he was appointed second theology professor in Uppsala and became a Doctor of Theology. In 1649 he started to work on a critical edition of the Old Testament with basic text and Latin translation. He also participated in politics and became a member of the Riksdag of the Estates in 1650.

== Bishop ==
Eventually he lost the trust of Queen Kristina; however, he gained favor with Charles X Gustav, Kristina's successor, who the appointed him Bishop of Turku in 1658. He commenced his episcopacy in 1659, after having participating in a commission for the reorganization of the Church Order. Terserus was well-learned, sharp-minded, hardworking and busy. However, he was also difficult, self-centered, stubborn and self-righteous, and consequently acquired numerous enemies. In 1662 he published his Declaration on Catechism, which included the basic Christian teachings. But he was heavily criticized by Professor Enevald Svenonius, who was a defender of pure Lutheranism and accused of Terserus of syncretism. Consequently, the council intervened and appointed a commission to investigate the matter. Its decision resulted in the withdrawal of Terserus' writings; he was suspended from exercising his episcopal duties in Turku in 1664.

He was then appointed vicar of Riddarholm Church in Stockholm in 1665, and in 1668 was appointed vicar of the Klara Church. In 1671, he was appointed Bishop of Linköping. At first he remained silent and did not say anything related to his previous suspension from Turku, but in 1675, after he was commissioned to take part in the theology doctorate ceremony in the Riksdag, he broke his silence and once more defended his theological statements. This created great controversy, leading him to withdraw from his diocese. He died on 11 April 1678.

== Family ==
Terserus married Elisabet Troilia in 1638 and after her death married Maria Grubb in 1657. A son from the first marriage was knighted with the name Tersér, while another, Uno Terserus, became a professor.

== See also ==
- List of bishops of Turku

Religious titles
Preceded by Aeschillus Petraeus	Bishop of Turku; 1658 – 1664	Succeeded by Johannes Gezelius the elder
