= Johannes Gezelius =

Johannes Gezelius is the name shared by three Finnish bishops:

- Johannes Gezelius the elder (1615–1690), bishop of Turku 1664–1690
- Johannes Gezelius the younger (1647–1718), bishop of Turku 1690–1718
- Johannes Gezelius the youngest (1686–1733), Bishop of Porvoo 1721–1733
