= Johannes Gezelius the Younger =

The Right Reverend Johannes Gezelius the Younger
- Bishop of Turku
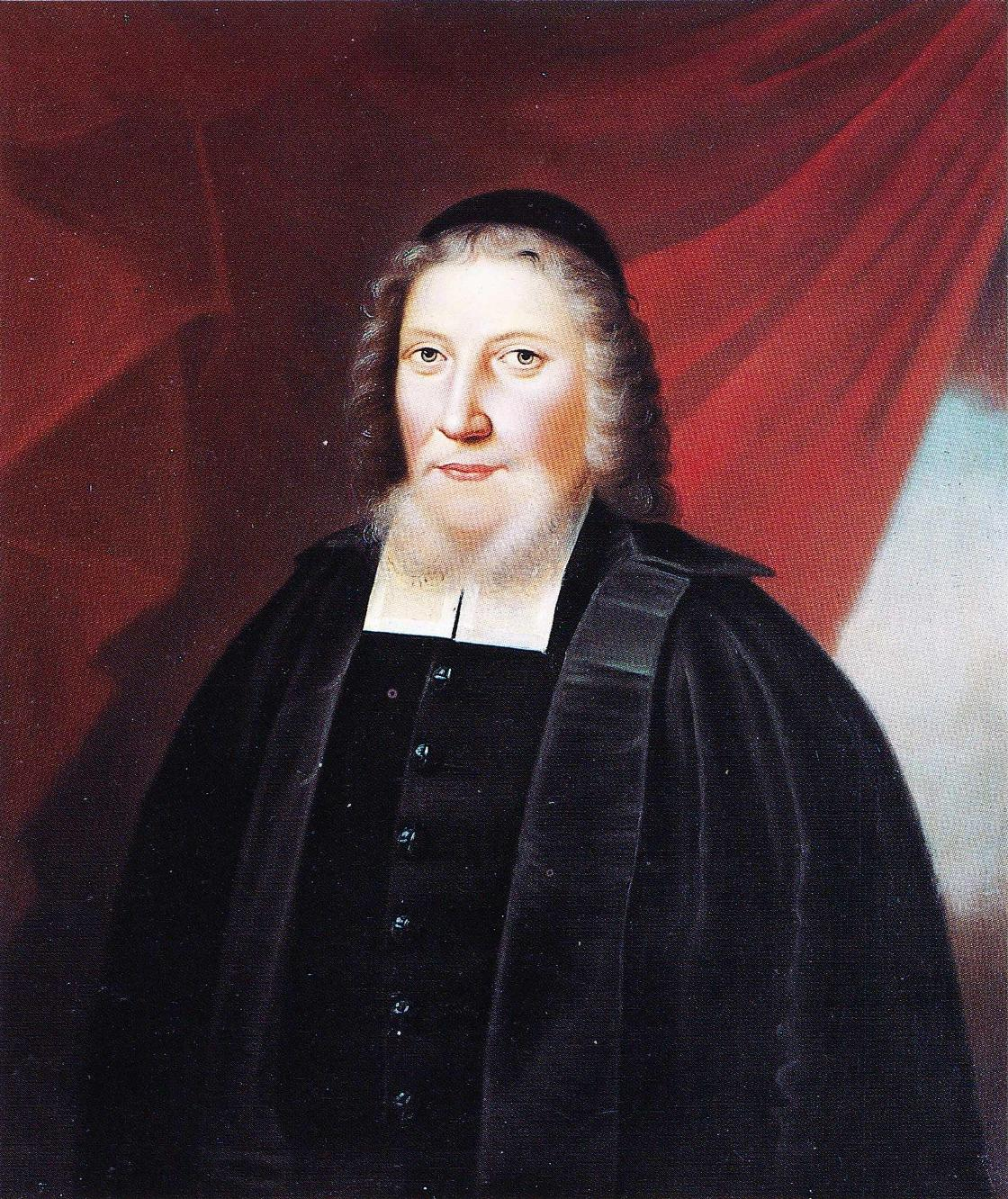
- Church: Church of Sweden
- Diocese: Turku
- In office: 1690–1718
- Predecessor: Johannes Gezelius the elder
- Successor: Herman Witte
- Previous post: Superintendent of Livonia (1684-1688)

Orders
- Consecration: 20 August 1690 by Olov Svebilius

Personal details
- Born: September 6, 1647 Dorpat, Swedish Empire
- Died: April 10, 1718 (aged 70) Stockholm, Swedish Empire
- Buried: Turku Cathedral
- Denomination: Lutheran
- Parents: Johannes Gezelius the elder & Gertrud Gutheim

Johannes Gezelius the Younger (6 September 1647–10 April 1718) was a theologian, professor at the Royal Academy of Åbo and Bishop of Turku between 1690 and 1718.

== Biography ==
Gezelius was the son of Bishop Johannes Gezelius the elder and Gertrud Gutheim. His own son, Johannes Gezelius the youngest, was bishop of Porvoo. In 1670 Gezelius left to study in Germany, England and France against his father's wishes. He studied in Oxford under the direction of Edward Pococke. In 1674 he returned to Turku and defended his doctorate in 1675, after which he was appointed a theology professor at the Royal Academy of Turku.

Between 1684 and 1688 he was the Superintendent of Livonia. Upon his father's death in 1690, he was appointed his successor in Turku. During his time as Bishop of Turlku, Gezelius published a hymnal that had been edited by Erik Cajanus. It was later commonly called the Old Hymnal (Finnish: Vanha virsikirja) and was based on a Swedish hymnal from 1695.

== See also ==
- List of bishops of Turku

Religious titles
Preceded by Johannes Gezelius the elder	Bishop of Turku; 1690 – 1718	Succeeded by Herman Witte
