= Johannes Gezelius the Elder =

Bishop of Turku from 1664 to 1690

The Right Reverend Johannes Gezelius the Elder
- Bishop of Turku
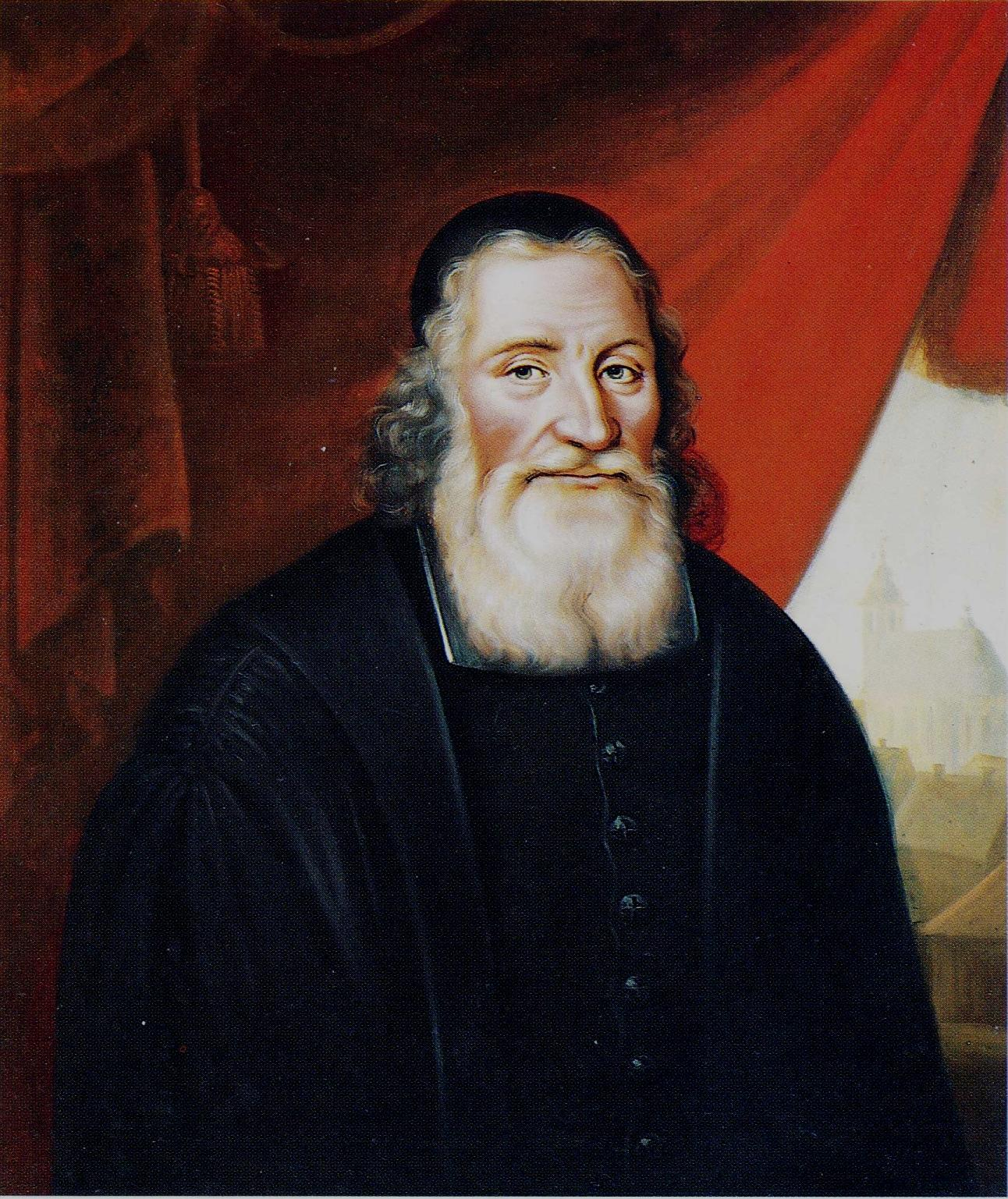
- Church: Church of Sweden
- Diocese: Turku
- In office: 1664–1690
- Predecessor: Johannes Terserus
- Successor: Johannes Gezelius the younger
- Previous post: Superintendent of Livonia (1660–1664)

Orders
- Consecration: 26 May 1665 by Johannes Canuti Lenaeus

Personal details
- Born: 3 February 1615 Tillberga, Västmanland, Swedish Empire
- Died: 20 January 1690 (aged 74) Turku, Swedish Empire (Present-day Finland)
- Buried: Turku Cathedral
- Denomination: Lutheran
- Parents: Göran Andersson & Anna Gudmundsdotter
- Spouse: Gertrud Gutheim; Christina Persdotter
- Children: 5

Johannes Gezelius the Elder (3 February 1615 – 20 January 1690) was the Bishop of Turku and the Vice-Chancellor of The Royal Academy of Turku (1664–1690).

== Biography ==
Gezelius was born at Tillberga in the parish of Romfartuna (now Västerås) in Västmanland, Sweden. Gezelius was a peasant's son, but was observed in childhood to have apparent gifts and was given a personal tutor, Boetius Murenius. After studying in Västerås (1626) and at the Uppsala University (1632), he graduated in Academia Gustaviana (now the University of Tartu in Tartu, Estonia) with a Master of Arts degree in 1641. His first professorship was of Greek and oriental languages at Tartu in 1642. Subsequently, he worked as a grammar school in Västerås as a lecturer in theology and vicar at Stora Skedvi in Säter, Sweden. Gezelius was appointed Superintendent of Livonia at Riga in 1660 and the Swedish parish vicar at Riga. He received his Doctor of Theology at Uppsala University in 1661 and was named Bishop of Turku and the Vice-Chancellor of The Royal Academy of Turku in 1664.

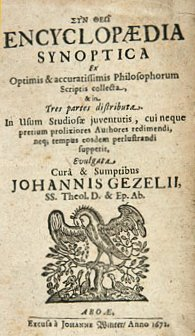
Encyclopaedia synoptica

Gezelius published a number of textbooks and devoted his thesis in theology. In 1666, he published En rätt barnaklenodium, which went through 70 editions over the next two centuries. In 1672, Gezelius published Encyclopaedia synoptica: ex optimis & accuratissimis philosophorum scriptis collecta, a three-piece Latin encyclopaedia which specifically dealt with fields of philosophy and mathematics. Encyclopaedia synoptica is considered to be Finland's first encyclopedic work. Johannes Gezelius the elder was known as an opponent of Finnish paganism and in 1673 ordered the destruction of spells.

== See also ==
- Johannes Gezelius the Younger (1647–1718), bishop of Turku 1690–1718
- Johannes Gezelius the youngest (1686–1733), Bishop of Porvoo 1721–1733

Religious titles
Preceded by Johannes Terserus	Bishop of Turku; 1664 – 1690	Succeeded by Johannes Gezelius the younger
