= Carl Fredrik Mennander =

Swedish bishop and archbishop

The Most Reverend Karl Fredrik Mennander
- Archbishop of Uppsala; Primate of Sweden
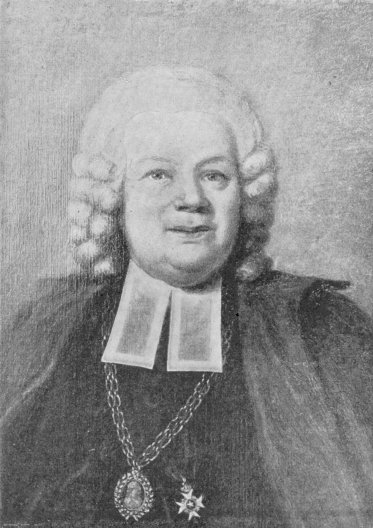
- Church: Church of Sweden
- Archdiocese: Uppsala
- Appointed: 1775
- In office: 1775–1786
- Predecessor: Magnus Beronius
- Successor: Uno von Troil
- Previous posts: Bishop of Turku (1757–1775)

Orders
- Consecration: 8 July 1757 by Henric Benzelius
- Rank: Metropolitan Archbishop

Personal details
- Born: 19 July 1712 Stockholm, Sweden
- Died: 22 May 1786 (aged 73) Uppsala, Sweden
- Parents: Anders Mennander; Margareta Elisabeth Ruuth
- Spouse: Ulriika Palén (1741–1742); Johanna Magdalena Hassel (1747–1749)
- Children: Carl Friedrich (Fredenheim) Mennander
- Education: Royal Academy of Turku; University of Uppsala

Carl Fredrik Mennander (sometimes modernised as Karl Fredrik Mennander, often just C.F. Mennander; 19 July 1712, Stockholm – 22 May 1786) was the bishop of Turku in Finland from 1757–1775 and then the archbishop of Uppsala in the Church of Sweden from 1775 to his death.

== Biography ==
He arrived as a student at the University of Uppsala in 1731 and got acquainted with the botanist Carl Linnaeus. In 1735 he travelled to Turku, Finland, and finished his education with a Master of Arts. He stayed in Turku for fifteen years, and made several important improvements there within the school system and hospital facilities.

He was ordained priest, and also had a professorship in physics. In 1757 he was consecrated Bishop of Turku. In 1775 he was elected Archbishop of Uppsala by the cathedral chapter and settled in Uppsala.

He became highly engaged in the matters of the Uppsala University and published many disputations, speeches and dissertations. At his death, he had gathered one of the finest book collections of his time. He was a member of the Royal Swedish Academy of Sciences from 1744. Mennander was also a member of Pro Fide et Christianismo, a Christian education society.

== See also ==
- List of bishops of Turku
- List of archbishops of Uppsala

== Sources ==
- (in Swedish) Nordisk familjebok (1913), article Mennander
- (in Swedish) Sv. biografiskt handlexikon, article Mennander

Religious titles
Preceded by Johannes Browallius	Bishop of Turku; 1757 – 1775	Succeeded by Jakob Haartman
Preceded by Magnus Beronius	Archbishop of Uppsala; 1774 – 1786	Succeeded by Uno von Troil
