= Magnus (bishop) =

Roman Catholic bishop of Turku

Bishop Magnus I, also known as Mauno, was the Roman Catholic bishop of Turku between 1291 and 1308. He was the first bishop who is known to have been born in Finland. He also helped to complete the Christianization of Finland started by St. Henry.

In 1300, Bishop Magnus translated the relics of St. Henry during a period of consolidation of religious and secular power in Medieval Northern Europe. In the same year, he consecrated Turku Cathedral.

== See also ==
- List of bishops of Turku
