= Aeschillus Petraeus =

Bishop of Turku from 1652 to 1657

The Right Reverend Aeschillus Petraeus
- Bishop of Turku
- Church: Church of Sweden
- Diocese: Turku
- Appointed: 20 October 1652
- In office: 1652–1657
- Predecessor: Isaacus Rothovius
- Successor: Johannes Terserus

Orders
- Consecration: 24 October 1652

Personal details
- Born: 1593 Grums, Swedish Empire
- Died: 27 September 1657 (aged 63–64) Turku, Swedish Empire (Present-day Finland)
- Denomination: Lutheran
- Parents: Olavus Eskilli Petræus & Katarina
- Spouse: N.N. Andersdotter Petraeus; Anna Henriksdotter Kock
- Children: 5

Æschillus (Eskil) Petræus (born 1593 in Grums, Sweden; died 27 September 1657 in Turku, now in Finland) was Bishop of Turku in 1652–1657.

== Biography ==
Petræus studied in Uppsala, and gained his Master's degree there in 1619; he then studied in Jena in Germany.

Petræus was lecturer and Dean of the grammar school in Turku. He was also the first professor of theology at Turku Academy and Rector of the University. Petræus was from the Swedish-speaking part of Sweden, but well versed in the Finnish language. He worked reformed the large Finnish diocese, to bring it closer to the Swedish system; in particular, he supported stricter church discipline. He, among other things, led a Bible Translation Committee and published the first grammar of the Finnish language, Linguae Finnicae brevis institutio in 1649. On 20 October 1652 he was appointed Bishop of Turku and was consecrated on 24 October at the Storkyrkan in Stockholm.

== Family ==
Petræus was married twice, first to Miss Anders of Turku, then to Ann Kock of Stockholm; he had four children.

== See also ==
- List of bishops of Turku
- Johannes Rudbeckius
- Isaacus Rothovius

Religious titles
Preceded by Isaacus Rothovius	Bishop of Turku; 1652 – 1657	Succeeded by Johannes Terserus
