= Margareta Capsia =

Finnish artist (1682-–1759)

- Born: 1682; Sweden
- Died: 20 June 1759 (aged 76–77); Åbo (Turku), Finland, Kingdom of Sweden
- Known for: Painting
- Spouse: Jacob Gavelin (m. 1719)

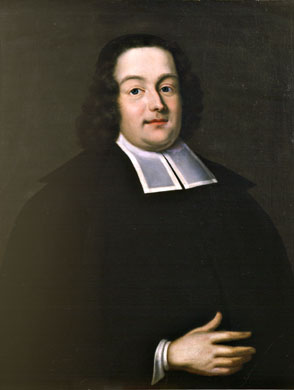
Johannes Browallius by Margareta Capsia, Helsinki University Museum, 1750

Margareta Capsia (1682 – 20 June 1759) was the first professional native female artist in Finland, which during her lifetime was a part of Sweden. She mainly painted altarpieces, but was also active as a portrait painter.

== Biography and career ==
Capsia was born in Sweden, the child of Gottfried Capsia and Anna Schultz. She married the priest Jacob Gavelin in Stockholm in 1719. After the Great Northern War in 1721 they moved to Vasa (Vaasa), where Margareta became known as an altarpiece painter in Ostrobothnia.

In 1730, they moved to Åbo (Turku), where she became a famous artist throughout Finland, and where she eventually died. Her altarpieces were described as individual illustrations of the bible, and she was regarded as one of the best painters in the genre together with Mikael Toppelius. She painted the altarpieces of a long line of churches, such as in the churches of Paltamo in 1727 and Säkylä in 1739.
