= Petrus Follingius =

Swedish Lutheran bishop

The Right Reverend Petrus Follingius
- Bishop of Turku
- Church: Church of Sweden
- Diocese: Turku
- Appointed: February 1558
- In office: 1558–1563
- Predecessor: Mikael Agricola
- Successor: Paulus Juusten

Orders
- Consecration: 1558

Personal details
- Born: Östergötland, Swedish Empire
- Died: 1565 Turku, Swedish Empire Present-day Finland
- Denomination: Lutheran

Pietari Follingius or Petrus Nicolai Follingius (died 1565) was a Swedish prelate who was the Bishop of Turku from 1558 till 1563.

== Biography ==
Follingius, who initially wrote his name Folling or Follinger, was the son of peasants from Östergötland. He was educated at the Cathedral School in Linköping and later continued his studies at the University of Copenhagen. In 1547 he became the rector of the Linköping Cathedral school, and in 1550 he became vicar of the parish of Kärna in the Diocese of Linköping. Later he also became a canon of the cathedral chapter.

In 1558 he was appointed as a Bishop of Turku, based on the advice of Andreas Olai. However, his appointment was severely criticized since Follingius was not Finnish. The motivation for this was to have a bishop more likely to have allegiance with the king. Nevertheless, in May 1559 Gustav I of Sweden criticized Follingius' leadership style. He was one of the first bishops to interact with the local clergy and was deeply involved in how parishes can be coordinated. He also made numerous visitations throughout his diocese. Nonetheless, in May 1563 he was deposed by Eric XIV of Sweden, partly due to the complaints by Finnish clergy and also possibly due to suspicions that he was in sympathy with Duke John. In 1565 he was appointed Bishop of Reval, but he died before he took office.

== See also ==
- List of bishops of Turku

Religious titles
Preceded by Mikael Agricola	Bishop of Turku; 1558 – 1563	Succeeded by Paulus Juusten
