= Ericus Erici Sorolainen =

Finnish bishop (1546–1625)

The Right Reverend Ericus Erici Sorolainen
- Bishop of Turku
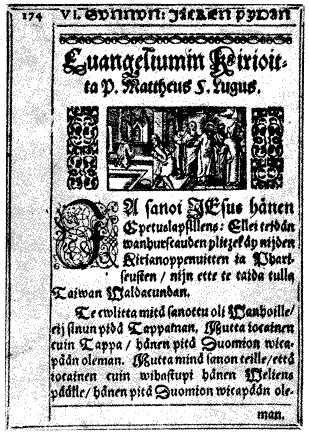
- Sorolainen's book of sermons
- Church: Church of Sweden
- Diocese: Turku
- In office: 1583–1625
- Predecessor: Paulus Juusten
- Successor: Isaacus Rothovius
- Other post: Administrator of Vyborg (1583-1625)

Orders
- Consecration: 8 September 1583 by Andreas Laurentii Björnram

Personal details
- Born: 1546 Laitila, Swedish Empire (Present-day Finland)
- Died: 1625 (aged 78–79) Turku, Swedish Empire (Present-day Finland)
- Denomination: Lutheran

Ericus Erici Sorolainen (1546–1625) was a Finnish Lutheran bishop, a Bishop of Turku from 1583 to 1625 as the successor to Paulus Juusten; and the administrator of the Diocese of Viipuri.

After his ordination to priesthood, he was sent to University of Rostock (rector of which was then David Chytraeus). After his studies he became 1578 headmaster of the school in Gävle. 1583 he was consecrated as bishop together with Petrus Benedicti of Linköping, Nicolaus Stephani of Växjö, and Christian Agricola of Tallinn with catholic ceremonies of the liturgy of John III. Soon after their episcopal consecration, these bishops had to sign a commitment to new Church Order (Nova Ordinantia), king John's liturgy, medieval tradition of church music and to use of some specific episcopal ceremonies, in addition to emphasis on study of Church Fathers. This was part of the Liturgical Struggle. King John even planned sending Sorolainen to Constantinople for ecumenical dialogue with Eastern Orthodox Church. This dialogue was already formerly initiated by Tübingen theologians with Patriarch Jeremias II of Constantinople. Later in Synod of Uppsala (1593), bishop Sorolainen together with Bishop Olaus Stephani Bellinus made secretly Calvinist Duke Charles his enemy by initiative of banning Calvinism in Sweden, which was decided by the synod. When Duke Charles became Regent, after his War against Sigismund, son of his brother John III, he used his opportunity to revenge to Bishop Sorolainen by imprisoning him for alleged "popery", which was although annulled by Diet of Lingköping. 1609 King Charles seems to have forgotten his earlier anger and distrust to Sorolainen.

Sorolainen was also a noted writer, publishing his first work in 1614. He translated into Finnish the service book of 1614, wrote a large catechism (1614). Between 1621 and 1625 he published a book of sermons in Stockholm entitled Postilla.

== See also ==
- List of bishops of Turku

== Sources ==
- Martti Parvio's biography in the reprint of Postilla.
- (in Swedish) Ericus Erici, article in Nordisk familjebok
- Liturgical Developments in Sweden and Finland in the Era of Lutheran Orthodoxy (1593–1700) by Toivo Harjunpää (JSTOR)

Religious titles
Preceded by Paulus Juusten	Bishop of Turku; 1583 – 1625	Succeeded by Isaacus Rothovius
