= Isaacus Rothovius =

Swedish bishop in Finland (1572–1652)

The Right Reverend Isaacus Rothovius
- Bishop of Turku
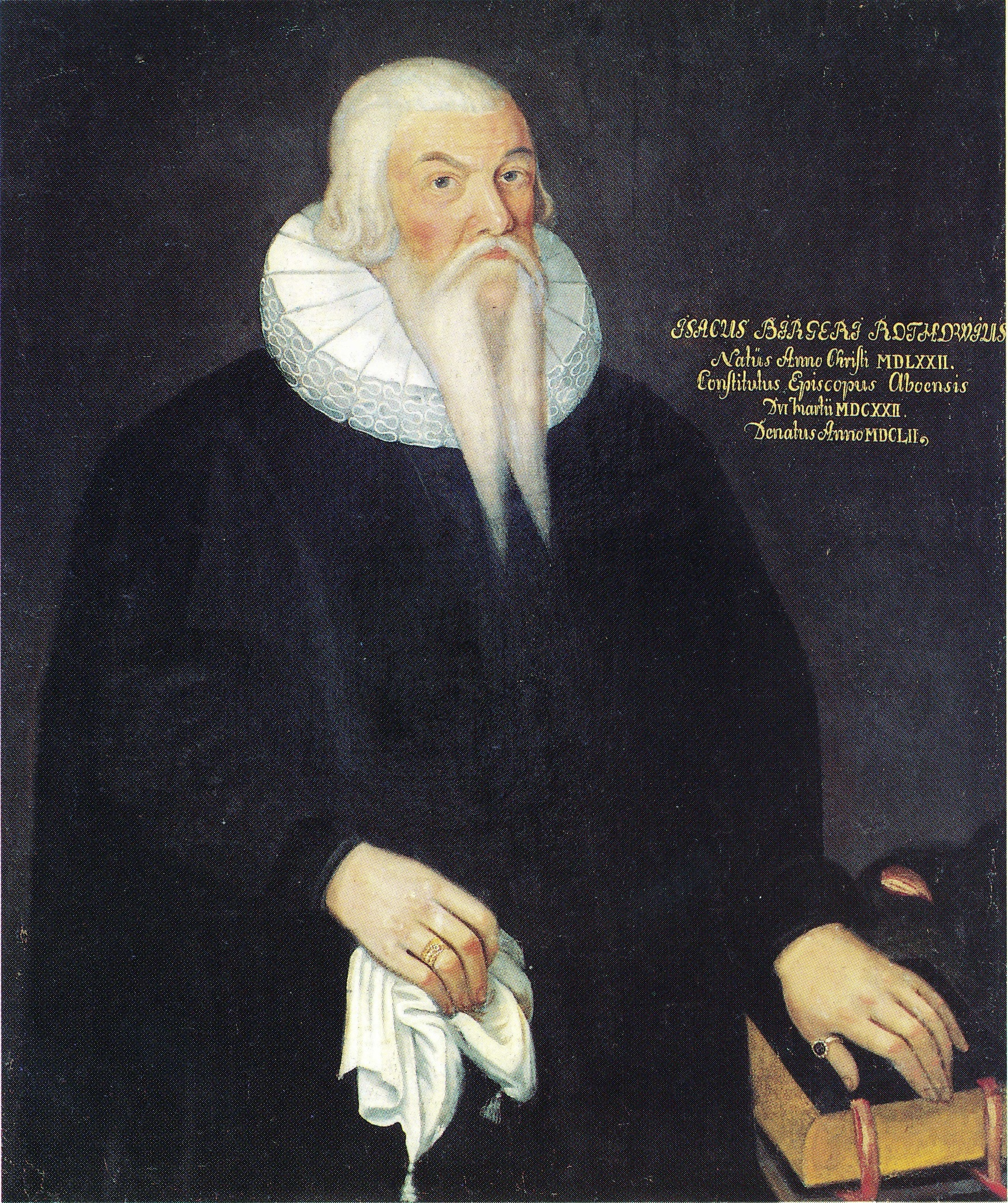
- Church: Church of Sweden
- Diocese: Turku
- Appointed: 6 March 1627
- In office: 1627–1652
- Predecessor: Ericus Erici Sorolainen
- Successor: Aeschillus Petraeus

Orders
- Consecration: 15 April 1627 by Laurentius Paulinus Gothus

Personal details
- Born: November 1, 1572 Småland, Swedish Empire
- Died: February 10, 1652 (aged 79) Turku, Swedish Empire (Present-day Finland)
- Denomination: Lutheran
- Spouse: Anna Eriksdotter; Carin Andersdotter

Isaacus Rothovius (1 November 1572 – 10 February 1652) was a Swedish cleric known for his influential role as the Bishop of Turku in Finland from 1627 to 1652. Born in Småland, Sweden, he was the son of a farmer named Börje Larsson and had a twin brother, Jonas Rothovius, who later served as the Superintendent of Kalmar. Rothovius pursued an educational journey that led him to Uppsala, where he became a teacher to the Oxenstierna brothers and traveled to Germany for further studies. He obtained a Master of Philosophy degree in Wittenberg in 1602 and was ordained as a priest the same year.

In his capacity as the Bishop of Turku, Rothovius faced linguistic and cultural challenges upon arriving in Finland. Despite initial differences, he left a lasting mark on Finnish society. Notable accomplishments include his involvement in expediting the translation of the Bible into Finnish, completed in 1642, and his role in educational reform. Rothovius transformed the Turku Cathedral School into an upper secondary school, the Gymnasium of Turku, in 1630, and supported the establishment of the Academy of Turku, which later became the University of Turku, in 1640. He also contributed to the organization of parish churches and left a significant legacy in both religious and educational spheres.

== Early life and education ==
Rothovius was born in Småland in southern Sweden in 1572, the son of a farmer Börje Larsson. Rothovius' grandfather was a German immigrant captain named Lorentz Roth. Rothovius' twin brother, Jonas Rothovius, was the Superintendent of Kalmar from 1618 till 1626.

Rothovius at several upper secondary schools and in 1595 went to Uppsala, where in 1597 he became a teacher to the brothers Axel Oxenstierna, Krister Oxenstierna and Gabriel Oxenstierna, with whom he went to Germany that same year and visited the universities in Rostock and Wittenberg. While in Wittenberg, Rothovius acquired a Master of Philosophy in 1602. He was also ordained a priest in 1602. Later he returned to his homeland and was appointed in 1603 to be vicar of Nyköping, where he remained until 1627.

== Bishop ==
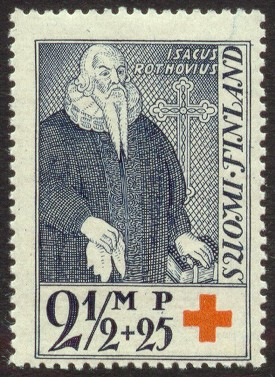
Finnish postage stamp, 1933

In 1627 he was appointed as Bishop of Turku, however he did not speak Finnish when he arrived in Turku. He also considered the Finns (especially during the early years of his term) to be barbaric. Bishop Rothovius forced the Finnish Evangelical Lutheran Church and its priests to change several of their customs, such as reading different Bible passages from different sides of the church, and wearing colourful garments, which reminded him of Finland's Roman Catholic past. Bishop Rothovius's most notable achievements were his help in speeding up the translation of the entire Bible into Finnish (completed in 1642), and in changing the Turku Cathedral School into the Gymnasium of Turku (an upper secondary school) in 1630, and in supporting the establishment of the Academy of Turku (now the University of Turku) in 1640. He also contributed to the formation of some parish churches, such as the separation of Myrskylä from Pernå in 1636.

== See also ==
- List of bishops of Turku

Religious titles
Preceded by Ericus Erici Sorolainen	Bishop of Turku; 1627 – 1652	Succeeded by Aeschillus Petraeus
