= Paulus Juusten =

The Right Reverend Paulus Juusten
- Bishop of Turku
- Church: Church of Sweden
- Diocese: Turku
- In office: 1563–1575
- Predecessor: Petrus Follingius
- Successor: Ericus Erici Sorolainen
- Previous post: Bishop of Vyborg (1554–1563)

Orders
- Ordination: 1540 by Martti Skytte
- Consecration: 1554 by Botvid Sunesson

Personal details
- Born: 1516 Vyborg, Sweden (Present-day Russia)
- Died: 22 August 1575 (aged 58–59) Turku, Sweden (Present-day Finland)
- Denomination: Lutheran

Paulus Petri Juusten (Finnish: Paavali Juusten; Swedish: Paul (Påvel) Pedersson Juusten; c. 1516/1520 – 22 August 1575) was the first Bishop of Viipuri, and later, Bishop of Turku. He was an esteemed teacher and a Swedish royal envoy.

== Early life ==
Paavali, as he was known before his ecclesiastical career, was initially schooled at the Viborg School of Latin. His parents, burgher Pietari Juusten and his wife Anna, owned their townhouse near the Blackfriars' monastery at Viborg. The street bore the name Juusteninkatu until the town centuries later was ceded to the Soviet Union. His parents seemingly died in ca. 1530 due to the plague. The orphan Paavali was sent to Turku, to study 1534–1536 at the Turku school. He was recruited to lecture as an assistant to the head teacher, bishop Martti Skytte. The bishop ordained Paulus as a priest in 1540, before he turned 24 that was the regularly required age for ordination.

== Religious career ==
Juusten was acting headmaster of the Viborg school 1541–1543, after which the bishop sent him to Germany, to study in several universities. He succeeded Mikael Agricola as headmaster of Turku cathedral school in 1548. He was member of the diocese chapter in 1553 and in 1554. In 1554 he was appointed as the inaugural bishop of Viborg, a new diocese. He was consecrated as bishop by Botvid Sunesson, bishop of Strengnes, a carrier of the apostolic succession. In 1563 he succeeded as bishop of Turku. The king sent bishop Juusten as ambassador to Russia in 1569, where tsar Ivan IV the Terrible kept him as a prisoner for over two years. Some sources claim that he received ennoblement from the king after his return in c. 1573. The year he died, Paulus consecrated Laurentius Petri Gothus as archbishop of Uppsala. He was buried at the Cathedral of Turku.

== Author ==
Juusten authored the Finnish-language catechism (1574), the tale of his Moscow travel, a Mass book (1575) and the Chronicle of Finnish bishops, Suomen piispainkronikka, Chronicon episcoporum finlandensium.

== See also ==
- List of bishops of Turku

Religious titles
Preceded by Petrus Follingius	Bishop of Turku; 1563 – 1575	Succeeded by Ericus Erici Sorolainen
