= Hemming of Turku =

Scandinavian Roman Catholic archbishop and saint

Blessed Hemming of Turku
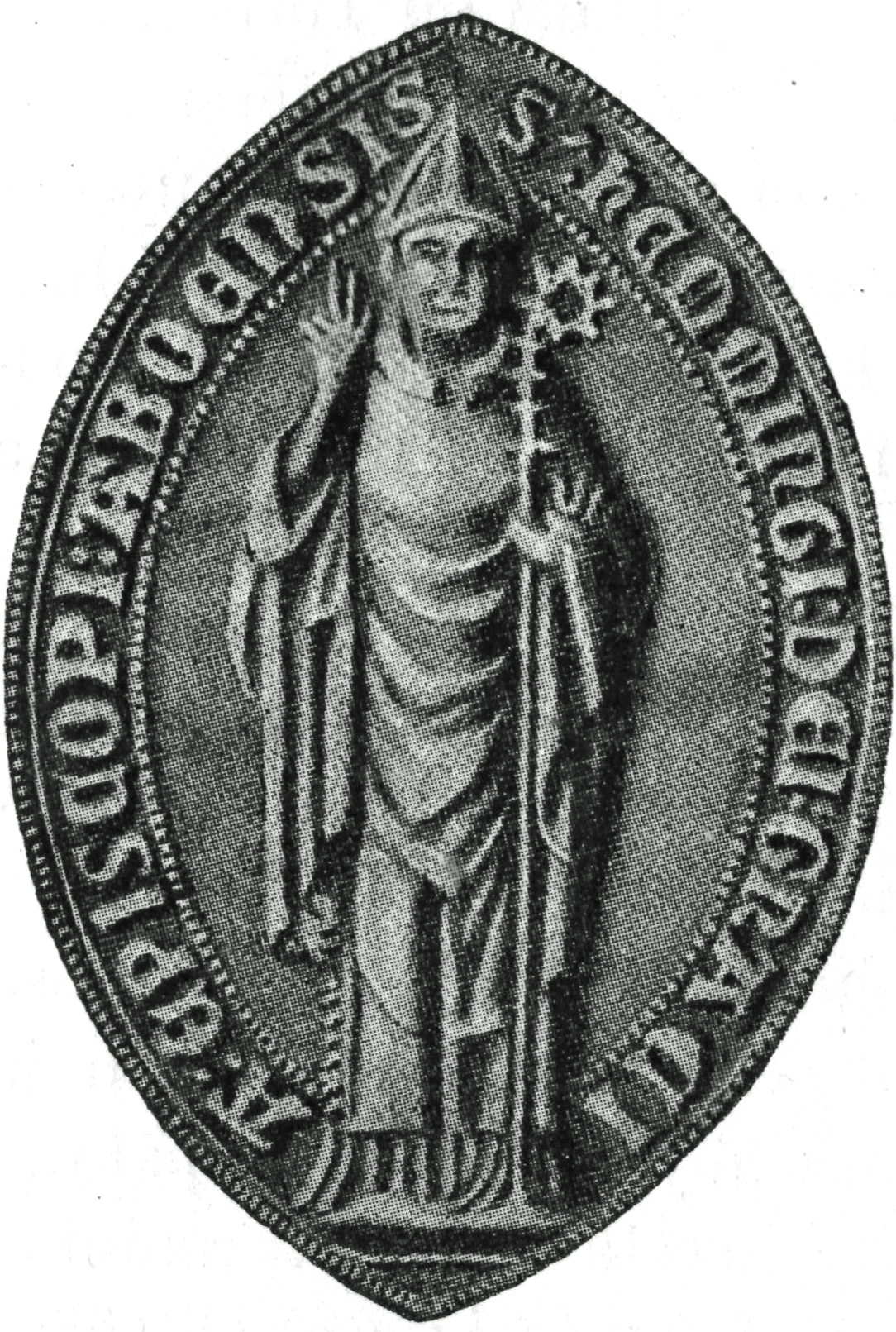

Bishop
- Born: 1290; Bälinge, Uppsala, Sweden
- Died: 21 May 1366 (aged 76); Turku, Finland
- Venerated in: Roman Catholic Church
- Beatified: 16 March 1499 (cultus confirmation), Old Saint Peter's Basilica, Papal States by Pope Alexander VI
- Major shrine: Turku Cathedral, Finland
- Feast: 21 May
- Attributes: Bishop's attire; Crozier
- Patronage: Turku; Against illness; Against danger

Blessed Hemming of Turku (1290–1366) was a Swedish Roman Catholic bishop who served as the bishop of Turku from 1338 until his death in 1366. He was born in Sweden though relocated to Finland following his appointment as bishop. He became a popular figure in the diocese for his staunch dedication to the educational and spiritual needs of the faithful. He was also a close friend of Saint Bridget of Sweden. During his studies he knew the future Pope Clement VI as one of his classmates.

The cause of sainthood opened under Pope Alexander VI in 1497 which later resulted in his beatification by Pope Leo X in 1514. Pope Clement VII was to preside over his canonization as a saint in 1530 but the Reformation halted all plans to do so.

== Life ==
Hemming was born in Uppsala in 1290 to middle-class parents who had connections to the nobles of Sweden.

He studied in Uppsala and later relocated to France where he studied in the University of Paris around the 1320s. One of his classmates at the time in France was in fact the future Pope Clement VI. He studied for a degree in the arts and later in both theological and legal studies. The completion of his studies allowed for him to be ordained to the priesthood and later appointed as the canon of the Turku Cathedral in Finland in 1329.

Hemming was appointed as the Bishop of Turku – as the successor of Bengt – in November 1338 and would remain in that position until his death; Pope Benedict XII confirmed the appointment. Hemming received his episcopal consecration in Stockholm in November 1339. He improved the educational resources of the diocese and reformed the training and discipline of priests. He also improved the liturgical furnishings and diocesan finances. Hemming also dedicated himself to attending to the needs of seminaries and in providing theological resources to the priests and seminarians; he donated around 40 books to the cathedral and founded both a school and a hospital.

The Turku Cathedral was damaged due to a fire in 1318 and so Hemming helped to finance the repairs after acquiring letters of indulgence from Pope John XXII. In 1353, he had permission to transfer a third of the tithes the parish gathered as funds for the repairs while in 1354 he added books on the Church Fathers and works on Canon Law to the cathedral's collection. In 1346 a dispute between him and the Archbishop of Uppsala regarding parish territories of Tornio and Kemi saw him travel to the former to meet Archbishop Hemming – also of his name – in which the two negotiated and succeeded in achieving a resolution.

The bishop later became a close friend of Saint Bridget of Sweden. The saint once said that he was "contemplative but at the same time an active and hardworking man". He travelled for the saint between 1347 until 1349. In 1347, he travelled to the Kingdom of France for her with her Cistercian confessor Peter of Alvastra to visit Pope Clement VI in Avignon in order to convince him to go back to Rome and reform the Roman Curia. He also went in her name to visit the King of England Edward III and the King of France Philip IV to achieve peace between the two but this never materialized.

In 1352, he completed his work "Statua" with rules for the responsibilities of priests.

Hemming died in mid-1366. Miracles were reported at his tomb and pilgrimages there began until such instances were recorded in 1400 when popular devotion reached an all-time high. His remains are now in the Turku Cathedral and have been there since the time of his beatification.

== Beatification ==
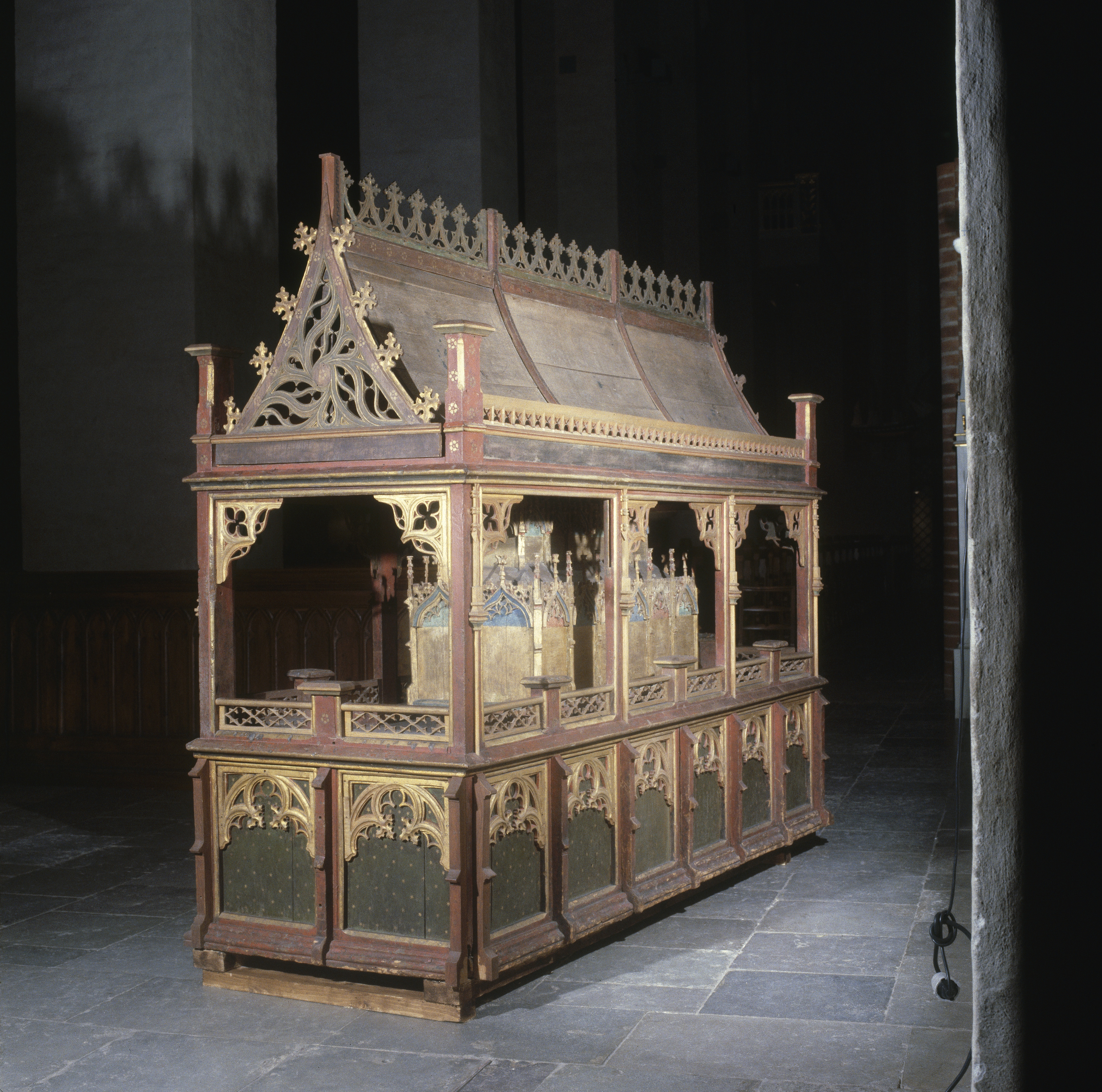
Hemming's tomb in the Turku Cathedral.

Hemming became titled as Servant of God after Pope Alexander VI – on 16 July 1497 – granted his approval to the commencement of the cause for beatification. Pope Leo X beatified Hemming in Rome at Old Saint Peter's Basilica in 1514. The canonization for the late bishop had been scheduled for 1530 but Pope Clement VII had to cancel it due to the Reformation.

The canonization movement has gained momentum in modern times. The documents about it have been lost but Finnish catholics have petitioned Pope Francis to canonize Hemming using equipollent canonization. Cardinal Marcello Semeraro told Helsinki Bishop Raimo Goyarrola in January 2024 that the canonization cause is advancing.

Hemming remains the patron of Turku and is the patron against both danger and illness.

== See also ==
- List of bishops of Turku
