= List of bishops of Turku =

The Archdiocese of Turku is the oldest diocese in Finland. Medieval bishops of the Catholic Church were also de facto secular leaders of the country until the end of the 13th century.

After the Reformation in Scandinavia, Lutheran bishops became state officials. When Finland became a separate grand duchy, the then bishop of Turku was designated as an archbishop in 1817. Since 1868, the archbishops of Turku and Finland have been considered primates of the Evangelical Lutheran Church of Finland.

== Bishop Henry ==
Henry, Bishop of Uppsala is often mentioned in contemporary sources as the first bishop of Finland. According to legend, the English-born Henry arrived in Finland with King Eric IX of Sweden during the First Swedish Crusade, later suffering martyrdom in the 1150s. His position as Bishop of Finland is, however, totally unhistorical, and not claimed even by legendary accounts.

== Catholic bishops of Finland ==
- Rodulff 1156?–1178? (first mentioned in the 15th century, uncertain)
- Fulco 1178?–1198? (first mentioned in the 15th century, uncertain)

An unnamed Bishop of Finland is mentioned dead in 1209. Papal letters to unnamed Bishops of Finland have survived from 1221, 1229 and 1232.

- Thomas 1230s?–1245
- Bero I 1248–1258

== Catholic bishops of Turku (Åbo, Aboa) ==
The position Bishop of Finland was renamed Bishop of Turku, first mentioned in 1259, in a move to harmonise the name of the dioceses with other Swedish sees.

- Ragvald I, 1258–1266
- Catillus, 1266–1286
- Johannes I, 1286–1290
- Magnus I, 1291–1308
- Ragvald II, 1309–1321
- Benedictus II Gregor (Bengt Gregoriusson, Pentti Gregoriuksenpoika), 1321–1338
- Hemming, 1338–1366
- Henrik Hartmansson (Henricus Hartmannipoika), 1366–1367
- Johannes II Petri (Johannes Pedersson, Johannes Pietarinpoika), 1367–1370
- Johannes III Westfal, 1370–1384
- Bero II Balk (Björn Balk), 1387–1412
- Magnus II Tavast (Maunu Tavast), 1412–1450
- Olaus Magni (Olof Magnusson, Olavi Maununpoika), 1450–1460
- Konrad Bitz, 1460–1489
- Magnus III Nicolai (Magnus Stjärnkors, Maunu Särkilahti), 1489–1500
- Laurentius Michaelis (Lauri Suurpää), 1500–1506
- Johannes IV Olavi (Johannes Olofsson, Johannes Olavinpoika), 1507–1510
- Arvid Kurki, 1511–1522
- Ericus Svenonius, 1523–1527
- Martti Skytte. 1528–1550

== Lutheran Bishops of Turku ==
- Mikael Agricola 1554–1557
- Petrus Follingius 1558–1563
- Paulus Juusten 1563–1575
- Ericus Erici Sorolainen 1583–1625
- Isaacus Rothovius 1627–1652
- Eskillus Petraeus 1652–1657
- Johannes Terserus 1658–1664
- Johannes Gezelius the elder 1664–1690
- Johannes Gezelius the younger 1690–1718
- Herman Witte 1721–1728
- Lars Tammelin 1728–1733
- Jonas Fahlenius 1734–1746
- Johan Browallius 1749–1755
- Karl Fredrik Mennander 1757–1775
- Jakob Haartman 1776–1788
- Jakob Gadolin 1788–1802
- Jakob Tengström 1803–1817

== Archbishops of Turku and Finland ==
The Bishop of Turku was elevated to archiepiscopal rank in 1817. The title of the see was changed to the Archbishop of Turku and Finland.

- Jakob Tengström 1817–1832
- Erik Gabriel Melartin 1833–1847
- Edvard Bergenheim 1850–1884
- Torsten Thure Renvall 1884–1898
- Gustaf Johansson 1899–1930
- Lauri Ingman 1930–1934
- Erkki Kaila 1935–1944
- Aleksi Lehtonen 1945–1951
- Ilmari Salomies 1951–1964
- Martti Simojoki 1964–1978
- Mikko Juva 1978–1982
- John Vikström 1982–1998
- Jukka Paarma 1998–2010
- Kari Mäkinen 2010–2018
- Tapio Luoma 2018–

== Bishops of Turku Archdiocese ==
Following the elevation of the Bishop of Turku to archiepiscopal rank in 1817, the title of Bishop of Turku was dormant until 1998. In 1998, it was revived for the bishop assisting the Archbishop in their as ordinary of the diocese of Turku.

- Ilkka Kantola 1998–2005
- Kari Mäkinen 2006–2010
- Kaarlo Kalliala 2011–2021
- Mari Leppänen 2021–

== See also ==
- Archdiocese of Turku
- Roman Catholic Diocese of Helsinki
