= Kaarlo Kalliala =

Finnish priest (born 1952)

The Right Reverend Kaarlo Kalliala
- Bishop of Turku
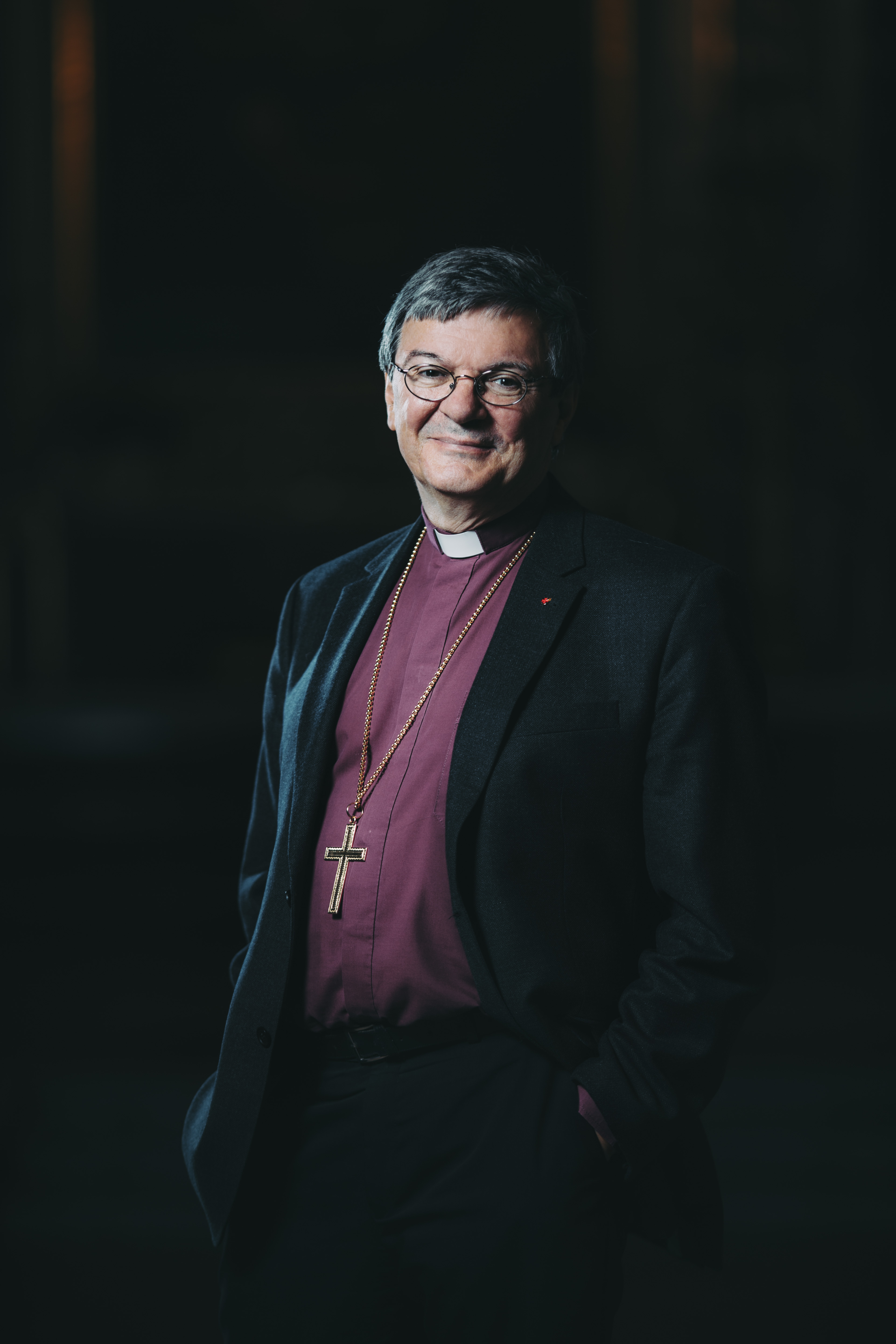
- Kaarlo Kalliala
- Church: Evangelical Lutheran Church of Finland
- Archdiocese: Archdiocese of Turku
- Elected: 28 October 2010
- In office: 6 January 2011 - 31 January 2021
- Predecessor: Kari Mäkinen
- Successor: Mari Leppänen

Orders
- Ordination: 1977
- Consecration: 6 January 2011 by Kari Mäkinen

Personal details
- Born: 3 November 1952 (age 73) Helsinki, Finland
- Spouse: Eija Kalliala
- Children: 2
- Education: University of Helsinki

Kaarlo Lauri Juhani Kalliala (born 3 November 1952 in Helsinki, Finland) is a Finnish theologian and the Bishop Emeritus of the Archdiocese of Turku.

== Education ==
Kalliala has studied theology at the University of Helsinki and received a master's degree in 1977. His thesis in dogmatics focused on Karl Rahner's theology of sacramental reality. Kalliala continued his graduate studies in Rahner's thought while serving as an Assistant in Dogmatic Theology at the University of Helsinki in 1979–1982. Kalliala earned a Licentiate in theology from the University of Helsinki in 1982.

== Ordained ministry ==
After having received his master's degree, Kalliala was ordained priest in Vaasa in 1977. He was appointed a parish priest in the Evangelical Lutheran Church of Finland in the parishes of Alahärmä and Kaskinen in 1977–1978. Kalliala served as the Finnish Port Chaplain in Rotterdam, the Netherlands in 1983–1989. He returned to Finland in 1989 and served as the Director of Diaconia at the Turku and Kaarina Parish Union in 1989–1998. This period was marked by a severe economic depression in Finland that caused grave societal challenges. After his tenure as the Director of Diaconia Kalliala was appointed the Dean of the Archdiocesan Chapter in 1998–2010.

== Bishop of the Turku Archdiocese ==
Kalliala was elected as the Bishop of the Turku Archdiocese on 28 October 2010, and consecrated and installed in the Turku Cathedral on Epiphany, 6 January 2011.

Since 1998, there have been two diocesan bishops in the Turku Archdiocese: the Bishop of Turku Archdiocese and the Archbishop of Turku and Finland. Neither of the two is a suffragan as there are no suffragan bishops in the Evangelical Lutheran Church of Finland. Episcopal oversight of the Archdiocese is shared between the Bishop and the Archbishop. According to the decision of the ELCF General Synod, the area of the primary oversight of the Bishop of Turku Archdiocese consists of 42 parishes, whereas the Archbishop's primary diocesan oversight covers the deanery of Turku which consists of 9 parishes. Moreover, the Bishop of Turku Archdiocese is in charge of the day-to-day running of the Diocesan Chapter.

As a Bishop, Kalliala had a particular interest in interreligious dialogue and in diaconia. He served as the chairperson of the consultative committee of the diaconia and the chair of the ELCF committee on developing diaconia and pastoral care. Kalliala was a member of the European Council of Religious Leaders, ECRL until 2020, and the chair of Committee for Interfaith Relations of the ELCF until 2019, after which he continued as a committee member. In addition to his other related positions, Kalliala is past chair (2017–19) and past vice chair (2013–17) of the board of the National Council of Religions in Finland, CORE, whose aim is to advance the harmony of the religions in Finland.

Bishop Kalliala retired on 31 January 2021. He was succeeded by bishop Mari Leppänen, the first female bishop of the Archdiocese of Turku. The celebrations honouring his retirement were severely restricted by the COVID-19 pandemic and the government restrictions on public gatherings.

Bishop Kalliala is interested in the theology of spirituality, mysticism and communication. Kalliala was a long time editor-in-chief for the Turku Archdiocese periodical Tuore oliivipuun lehti, which takes its name (translated as 'Fresh olive leaf') from the Latin Medieval hymn to St. Henry of Finland called "Ramus virens olivarum". Kalliala is active in social media and a frequent columnist in Turun Sanomat, Maaseudun Tulevaisuus and other newspapers.

== Personal life ==
Kalliala is married to the Revd Provost Eija Kalliala (Ilkka), and they have two adult children.

Religious titles
| Preceded by Ilkka Kantola | Bishop of Turku; 2011 – 2021 | Succeeded by Mari Leppänen |
