= Mari Leppänen =

Finnish bishop

The Right Reverend Mari Leppänen
- Bishop
- Leppänen in 2026
- Church: Evangelical Lutheran Church of Finland
- Elected: 3 December 2020
- In office: 1 February 2021 -
- Predecessor: Kaarlo Kalliala

Orders
- Ordination: 2012
- Consecration: 6 February 2021 by Tapio Luoma

Personal details
- Born: 26 September 1978 (age 48) Helsinki, Finland
- Spouse: Risto Leppänen
- Education: University of Helsinki

Mari Inka-Elina Leppänen (née Pentikäinen, born 26 September 1978 in Helsinki, Finland) is a Finnish theologian and the Bishop to the Archdiocese of Turku, together with the Archbishop Tapio Luoma, in the Evangelical Lutheran Church of Finland.

== Career ==
Leppänen studied theology and folkloristics at the University of Helsinki. She was ordained priest in Turku in 2012 by archbishop Kari Mäkinen. Leppänen was the first ordained woman of the Conservative Laestadianism branch of the Lutheran Church of Finland. Leppänen served as a parish priest in Lieto 2012–2014, worked as a project manager at the Office of the Church Council in 2014, and served as an advisor to the previous assistant bishop in Turku, Kaarlo Kalliala 2015–2017. From 2018 to 2021 Leppänen was the Dean of the Archdiocese of Turku.

Leppänen was elected as Bishop of the Turku Archdiocese on 3 December 2020, and consecrated in the Turku Cathedral on 7 February 2021. She is the first woman to hold the post, and only the third female Bishop in Finland.

Since 1998, there have been two diocesan bishops in the Turku Archdiocese: the Bishop of Turku Archdiocese and the Archbishop of Turku and Finland. Neither of the two is a suffragan as there are no suffragan bishops in the Evangelical Lutheran Church of Finland. Episcopal oversight of the Archdiocese is shared between the Bishop and the Archbishop. According to the decision of the ELCF General Synod, the area of the primary oversight of the Bishop of Turku Archdiocese consists of 42 parishes, whereas the Archbishop's primary diocesan oversight covers the deanery of Turku which consists of 9 parishes. Moreover, the Bishop of Turku Archdiocese is in charge of the day-to-day running of the Diocesan Chapter.

== Family ==
Leppänen was born to the family of professor Juha Pentikäinen and teacher Elina Pentikäinen. Her brother is Mikael Pentikäinen, the former editor-in-chief of the newspaper Helsingin Sanomat. Leppänen is married to the parish priest Risto Leppänen.

Religious titles
Preceded by Kaarlo Kalliala	Bishop of Turku; 2021 –	Incumbent
