= Helsinki University Museum =

Museum in Helsinki, Finland

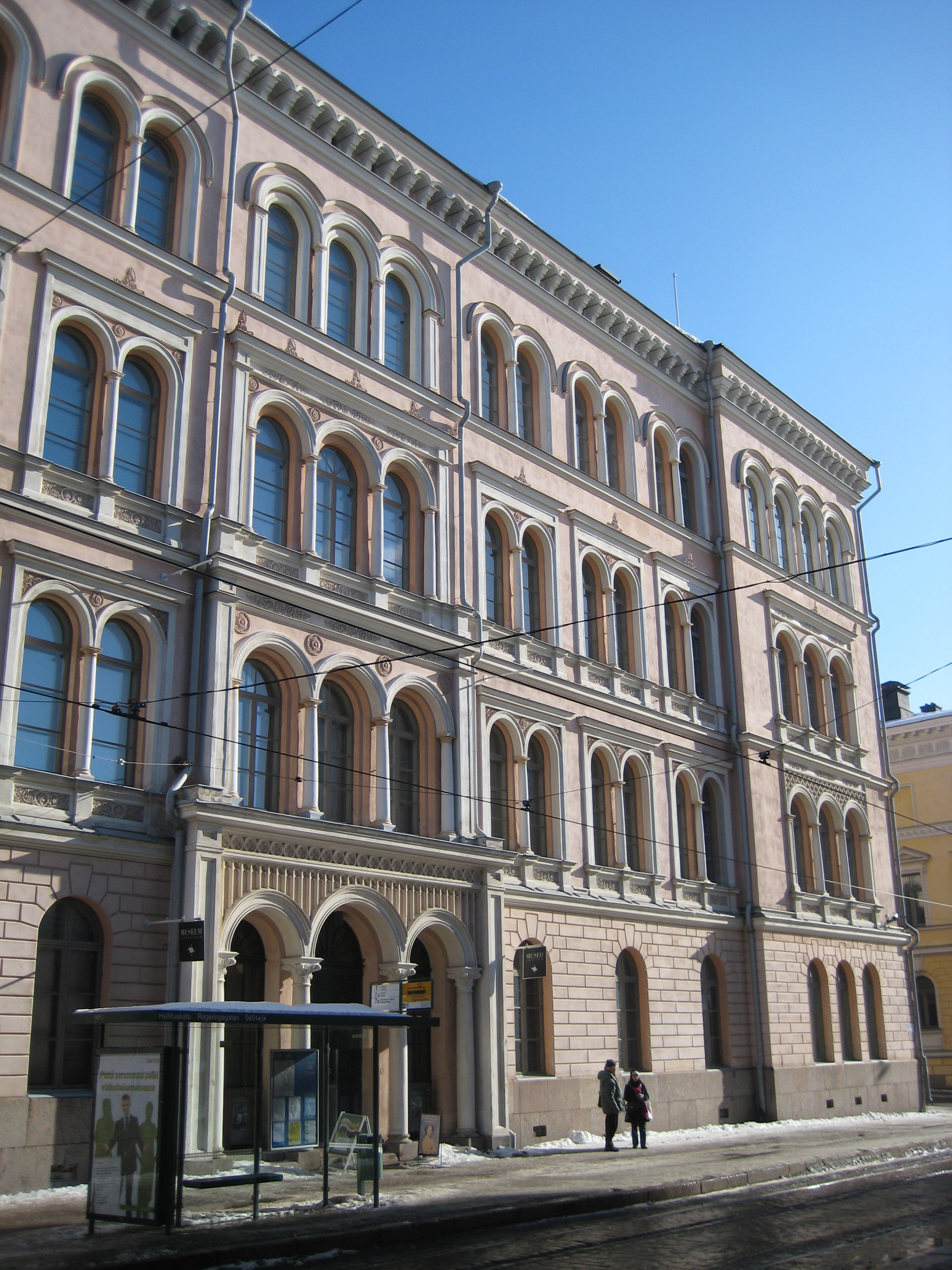
The University Museum served in Snellmaninkatu 3 between 2003 and 2014

Helsinki University Museum Flame (formerly Helsinki University Museum) is the museum of the University of Helsinki.

Helsinki University Museum Flame was established in 2003 by merging several museums operating under the auspices of the University of Helsinki. Later on, the Observatory and the Art Room were also merged with the University Museum.

The museum was located until June 2014 in a building called Arppeanum on Snellmaninkatu off the north-east corner of Senate Square.

The museum opened in Helsinki University Main Building in March 2015.
