= Turku Cathedral =

- Turun tuomiokirkko
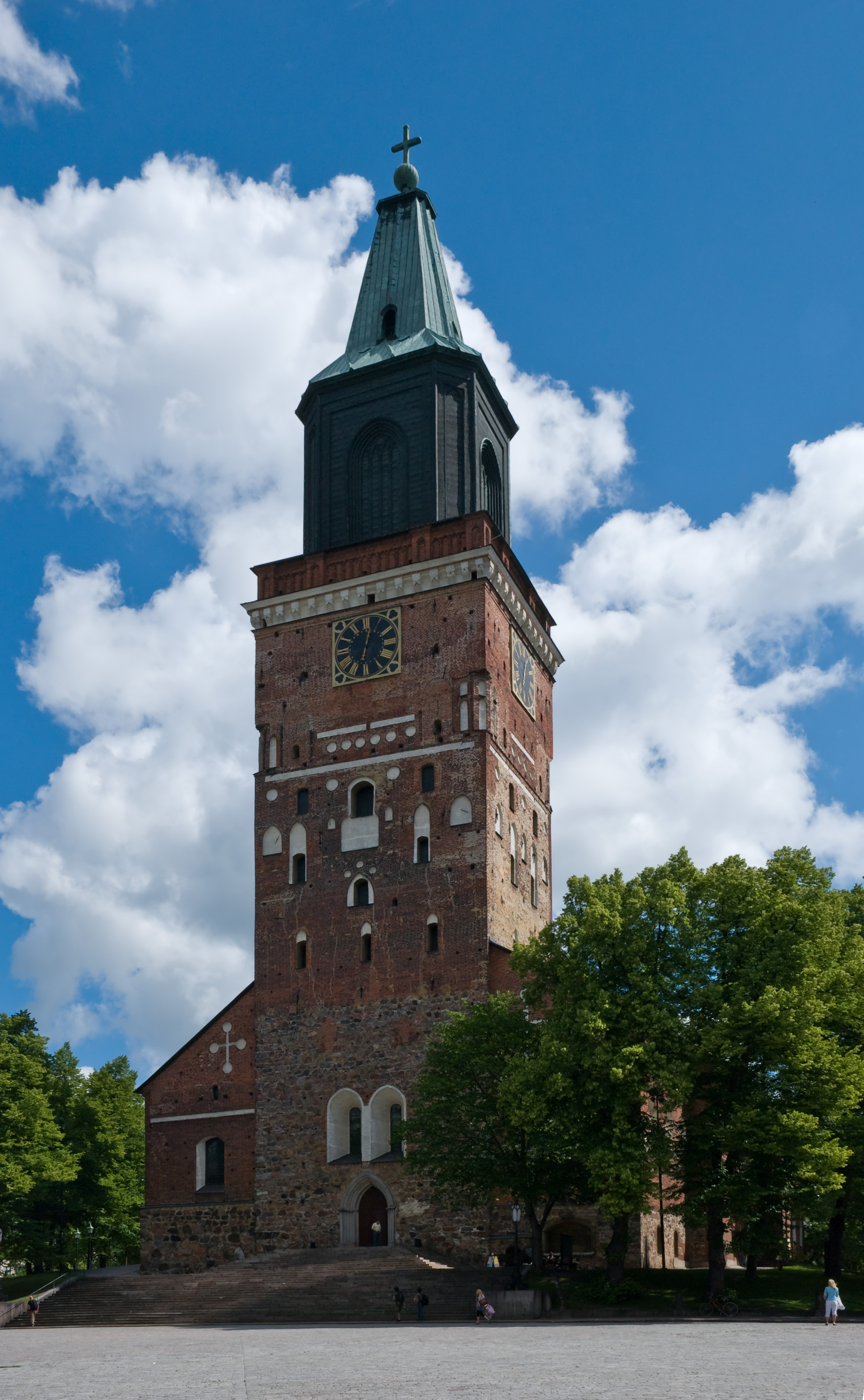
- Frontside of Turku Cathedral in summer 2008
- Turku Cathedral
- 60°27′09″N 22°16′41″E
- Location: Turku
- Country: Finland
- Denomination: Evangelical Lutheran Church of Finland
- Previous denomination: Catholic
- Website: Official Website

History
- Status: Episcopal polity
- Dedication: Blessed Virgin Mary; Saint Henry
- Consecrated: June 17, 1300; 726 years ago

Architecture
- Architectural type: Church
- Style: Gothic, Romanesque, Gothic Revival
- Years built: 1276–1300
- Completed: 1300

Specifications
- Capacity: 1,400 people
- Length: 89 m
- Width: 38 m
- Height: 85.53 m

Administration
- Province: Western Finland
- Archdiocese: Turku

Clergy
- Archbishop: Tapio Luoma

Turku Cathedral (Finnish: Turun tuomiokirkko, Swedish: Åbo domkyrka) is the only medieval basilica in Finland and the Mother Church of the Evangelical Lutheran Church of Finland. It is the central church of the Lutheran Archdiocese of Turku and the seat of the Lutheran Archbishop of Finland, Tapio Luoma. It is also regarded as one of the major records of Finnish architectural history.

Considered to be the most important religious building in Finland, the cathedral has borne witness to many important events in the nation's history and has become one of the city's most recognizable symbols. The cathedral is situated in the heart of Turku next to the Old Great Square, by the river Aura. Its presence extends beyond the local precinct by having the sound of its bells chiming at noon broadcast on national radio. It is also central to Finland's annual Christmas celebrations.

The cathedral was originally built out of wood in the late 13th century, and was dedicated as the main cathedral of Finland in 1300, the seat of the Catholic bishop of Turku. It was considerably expanded in the 14th and 15th centuries, mainly using stone as the construction material. The cathedral was badly damaged during the Great Fire of Turku in 1827, and was rebuilt to a great extent afterwards.

== History ==
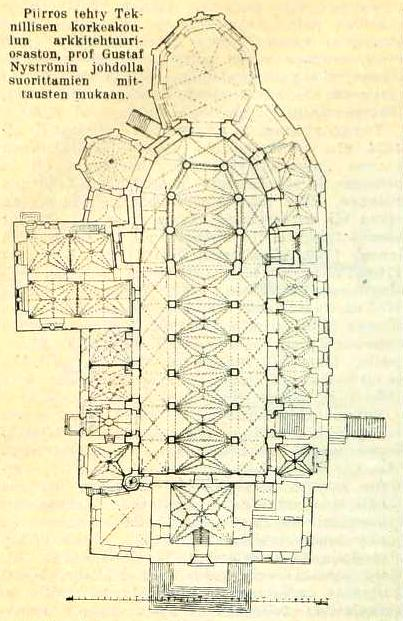
Turku Cathedral plan

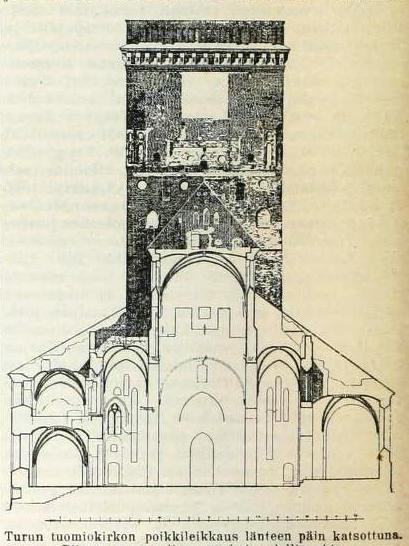
Turku Cathedral cross section

As the town of Turku began to emerge in the course of the 13th century as the most important trading centre in Finland, the Bishop's see of the Diocese of Finland was transferred from its previous location at Koroinen, some distance further up on the bank of Aura river, to the middle of the town. By the end of the 13th century, a new stone church had been completed on the site of the former wooden-built parish church on Unikankare Mound, and it was consecrated on 17 June 1300 by Bishop Magnus I as the Cathedral Church of the Blessed Virgin Mary and Saint Henry, the first Bishop of Finland.

At its earliest the cathedral was smaller than the present building. Its east front was where the pulpit stands now, and its roof was considerably lower than at the moment. Extensions were made to the cathedral throughout the Middle Ages. One of the cathedral's most well-known skull relic dates from this period. During the 14th century a new choir was added, from which the octagonal Gothic pillars in the present chancel originate. Throughout the Middle Ages, the high altar was located opposite the easternmost pillars of the nave, until it was transferred to its present location in the apse, in what had previously been the Chapel of All Saints, in the mid-17th century.

During the 15th century, side-chapels were added along the north and south sides of the nave, containing altars dedicated to various saints. One of which is the reliquary tomb of Bishop Hemming of Turku (1290–1366) surviving from the medieval period. He was the 12th bishop of Turku died in 1366. Bishop Hemming was a significant benefactor to the Turku Cathedral, overseeing major restorations in the 14th century. He was also a close friend of the Saint Birgitta of Sweden. After he died he originally was buried in the choir of the Turku Cathedral. However, in 1514 his remains were relocated to a niche on the north aisle of the church as he had been recognized as blessed by Pope Leo X, and thus his remains gained a new reliquary status. The reliquary container is a wooden chest decorated in the style of the early 16th century, though its colors are dulled over time, and now only traces of gold, yellow, blue and red remain, it is still easy to see that it would have been bright and colorful when it was first made. The niche is located next to the pulpit, in a rather dark and not clearly visible spot, thought the niche and the location by the aisle make it easily accessible, which would have been important feature due to its reliquary status.

Another historically important figure buried in the Turku Cathedral is Queen consort Karin Månsdotter (1550–1612), the only Swedish royal to be buried in Finland. She was the Queen of Sweden for a short period alongside Erik XIV but lived many decades of her life in the current day Finland. Upon her death in 1612 she was buried under the floor of the Tott Chapel on the south side of the cathedral. She was first buried to the Tott Chapel Tott family. In the 1860s her remains were raised from the burial vault by the Memorial Committee and they were moved to the Kankas Chapel in which she now resides in a black marble sarcophagus decorated with a crown resting on a golden pillow. The chapel itself is decorated in the 19th century after the Great Fire of Turku in 1827.

By the end of the Middle Ages there were 42 side chapels in total. The roof-vaults were also raised during the latter part of the 15th century to their present height of 24 meters. Thus, by the beginning of the Modern era, the church had approximately taken on its present shape. The major later addition to the cathedral is the tower, which has been rebuilt several times, as a result of repeated fires. The worst damage was caused by the Great Fire of Turku in 1827, when most of the town was destroyed, along with the interior of both the tower and the nave and the old tower roof. The present spire of the tower, constructed after the great fire, reaches a height of 101 meters above sea level, and is visible over a considerable distance as the symbol of both the cathedral and the city of Turku itself.

In the reformation the cathedral was taken by the Lutheran Church of Finland (Sweden). Most of the present interior also dates from the restoration carried out in the 1830s, following the Great Fire. The altarpiece, depicting the Transfiguration of Jesus, was painted in 1836 by the Swedish artist Fredrik Westin. The reredos behind the high altar, and the pulpit in the crossing, also both date from the 1830s, and were designed by German architect Carl Ludvig Engel, known in Finland for his several other highly regarded works. The walls and roof in the chancel are decorated with frescos in the Romantic style by the court painter Robert Wilhelm Ekman, which depict events from the life of Jesus, and the two key events in the history of the Finnish Church: the baptism of the first Finnish Christians by Bishop Henry by the spring at Kupittaa, and the presentation to King Gustav Vasa by the Reformer Michael Agricola of the first Finnish translation of the New Testament.

The cathedral houses three organs. The current main organ of the cathedral was built by Veikko Virtanen Oy of Espoo, Finland, in 1980, and features 81 ranks with a mechanical action.

=== Materials of the church ===
The first church in the location of the Turku Cathedral was made of wood, however, during the Middle Ages, the use of wood as a building material in cities was not recommended as a city-wide fire prevention method. The initial parts of the current church were constructed with grey stone and clay bricks, though the production of bricks was quite limited in Finland at the time and bricks were mainly used only for the church buildings. It is considered unusual that bricks would have been transported over long distances and therefore it is believed that brick production sites were generally built nearby the main construction site. Written records have been found mentioning a clay pit near the cathedral, owned by the local Dominican order. Many other churches remaining now from the medieval period are mainly made of stone and wood, and the use of brick was exceptional narrowed down to places that had brick making possibilities on site or nearby. The shaping of stone was still undeveloped in the 14th century in Finland and even though it was used for some churches and cellars it was not practical for more detailed use.

== Renovation of Turku Cathedral in the 2020s ==
An extensive renovation of Turku Cathedral is set to take place during this decade. The last major renovation occurred between 1976 and 1979, and the cathedral's technical building systems now require modernization to meet contemporary needs. Work is scheduled to begin in February 2026, with completion targeted for late 2028 — just in time for the 800th anniversary of the city of Turku. Turku Cathedral will be closed to the public for entire renovation period, 9 February 2026 – 2 December 2028. Due to the scale of the renovations, there won't be any weddings or other events in Turku Cathedral during the renovation in 2026-2028.

In addition to upgrades to the building systems, the project aims to improve accessibility and enhance the visitor experience while ensuring that the cathedral remains a functional and welcoming place of worship for modern-day Christian congregations. The project takes into account both functionality and historical preservation. One key goal is to repurpose underutilized backstage areas into new meeting spaces for the congregation. However, only minor modifications will be made to the main church hall.

During the upcoming renovation of the Cathedral, also the Turku Cathedral Museum will be reconstructed, but it will remain open throughout the summer of 2025. The museum will close 30 September 2025 for renovation, and will reopen after the renovation with refreshed exhibitions.

== Notable people buried in the cathedral ==
- Blessed Bishop Hemming (c. 1290–1366), Bishop of Turku
- Paulus Juusten (1516–1576), Bishop of Viipuri and later Bishop of Turku
- Karin Månsdotter (1550–1612), Queen of Sweden
- Princess Sigrid of Sweden (1566–1633), Swedish princess
- Samuel Cockburn (1574–1621), Scottish mercenary leader
- Torsten Stålhandske (1593–1644), officer in the Swedish army during the Thirty Years' War
- Åke Henriksson Tott (1598–1640), Swedish soldier and politician

== Gallery ==
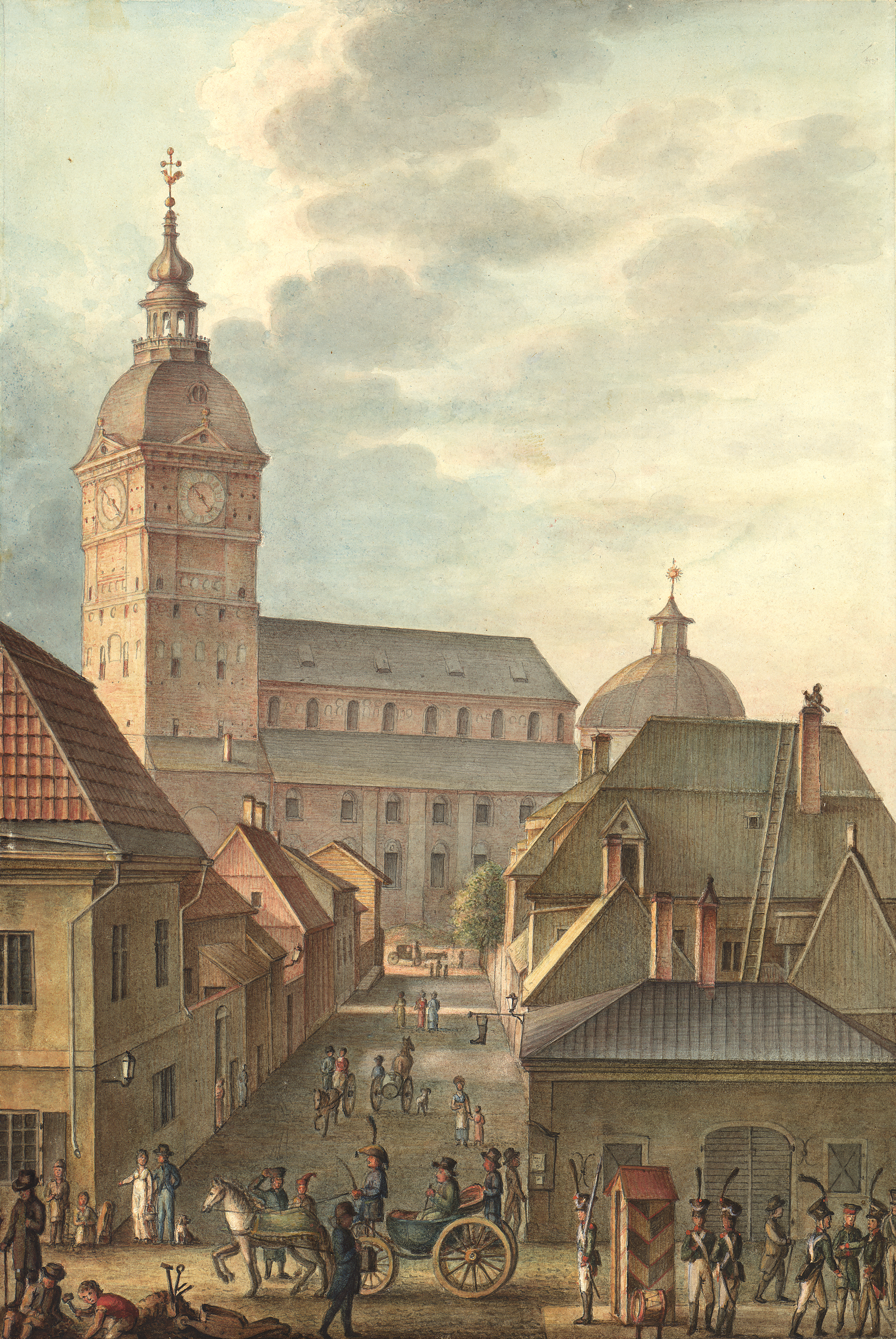
View before the Great Fire

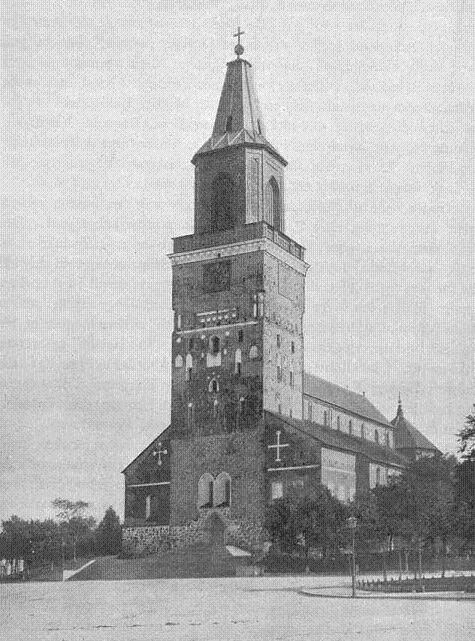
Cathedral in 1900

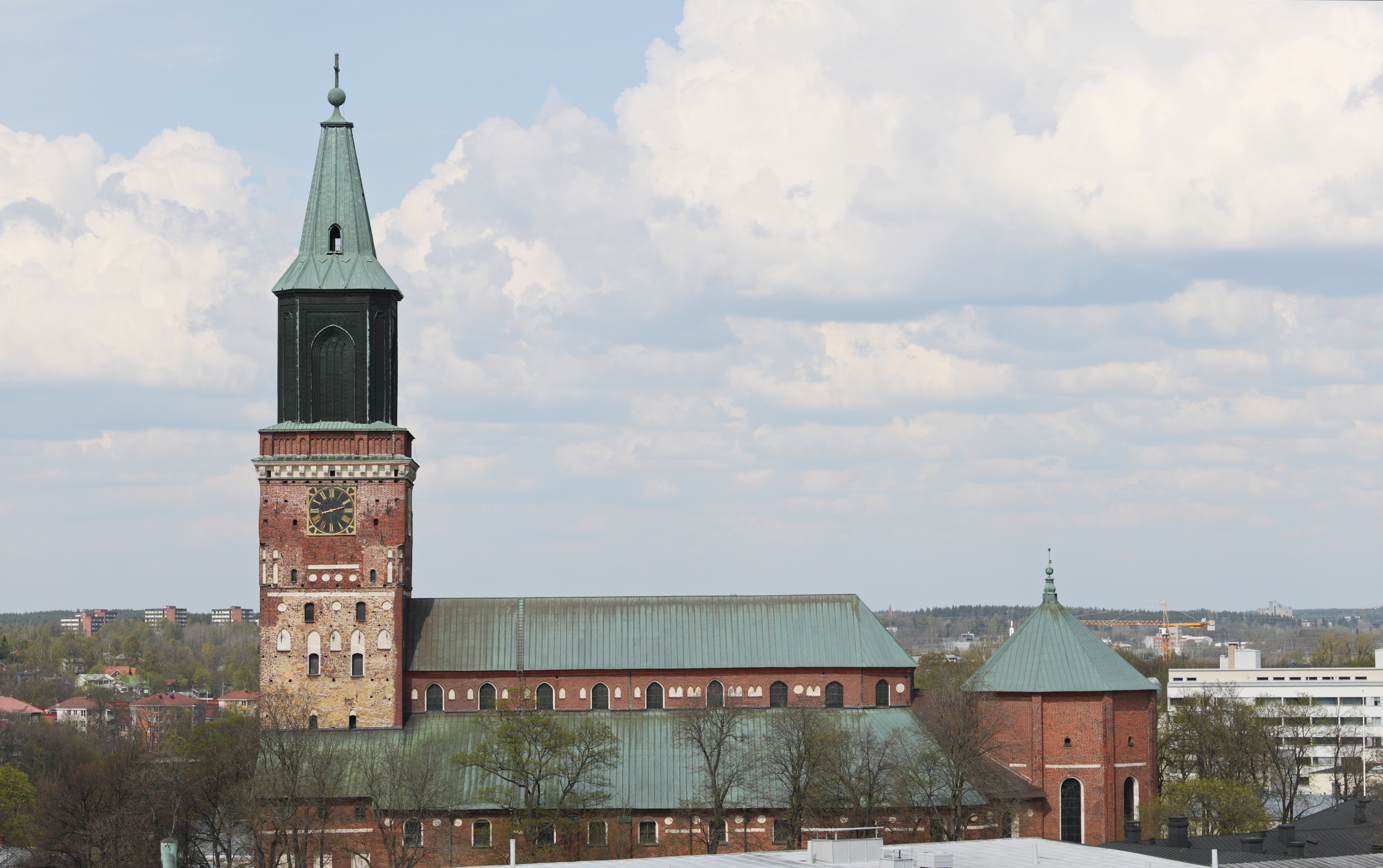
View of the cathedral from Vartiovuori hill

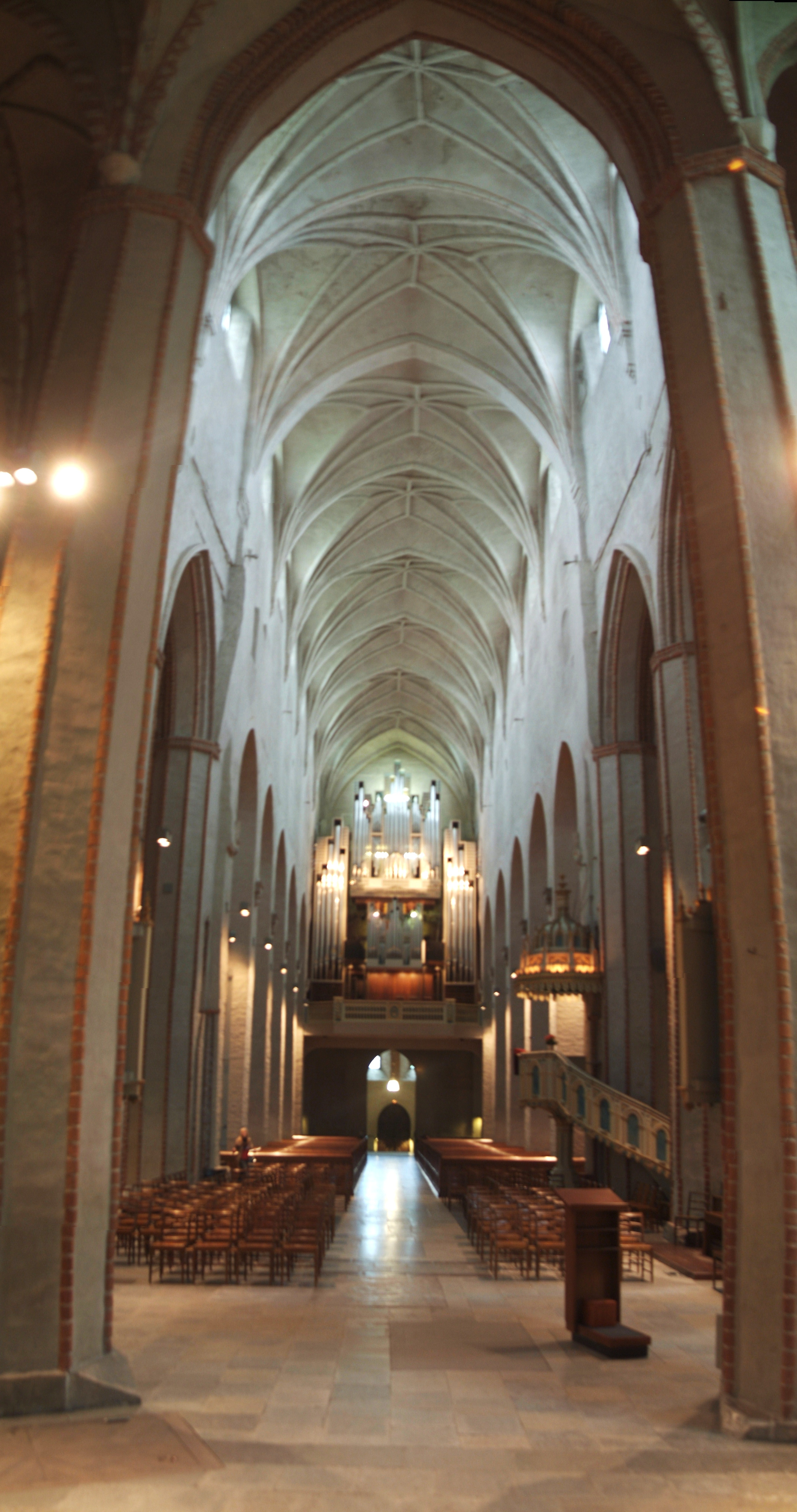
Interior view

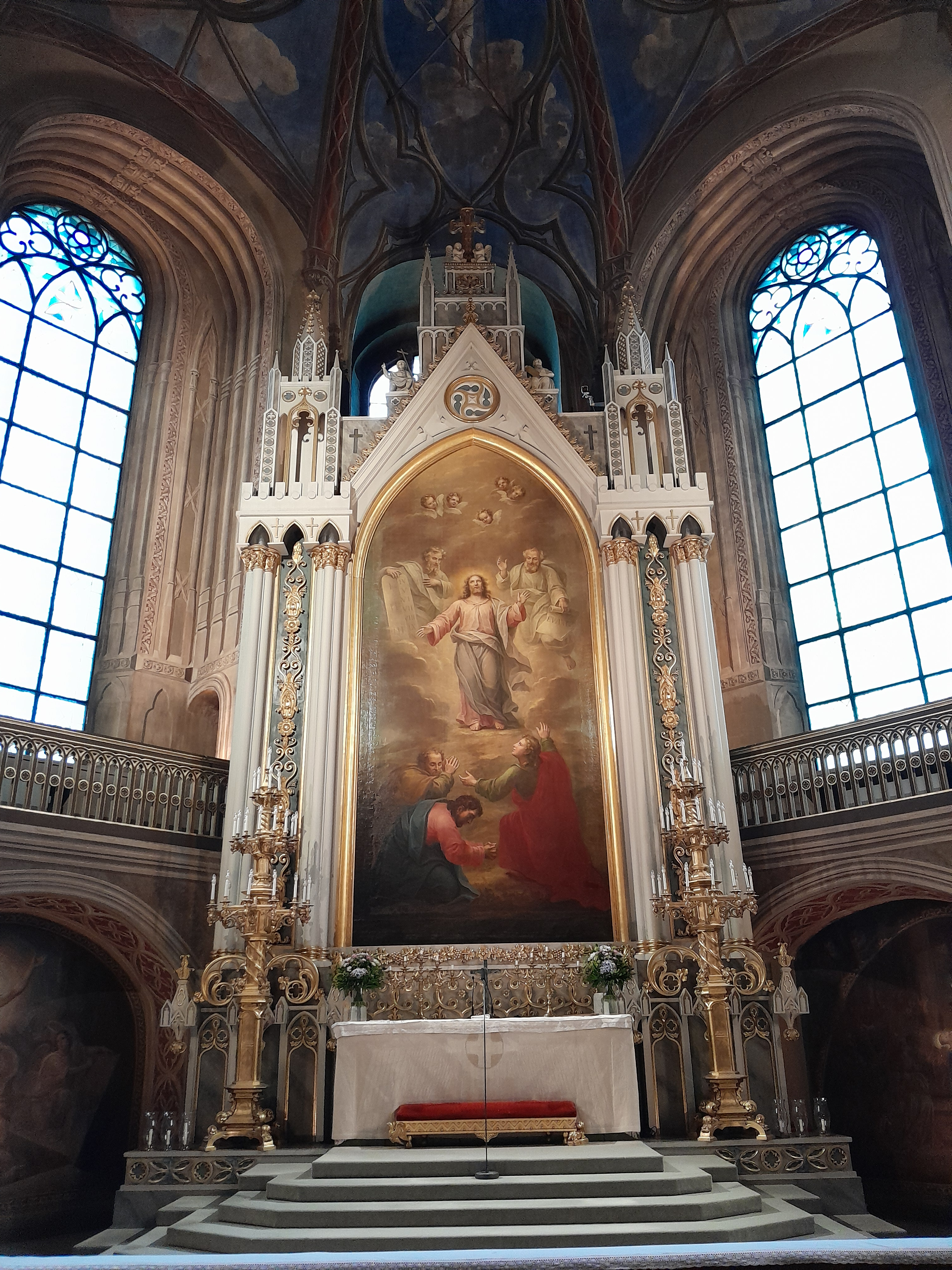
Altar

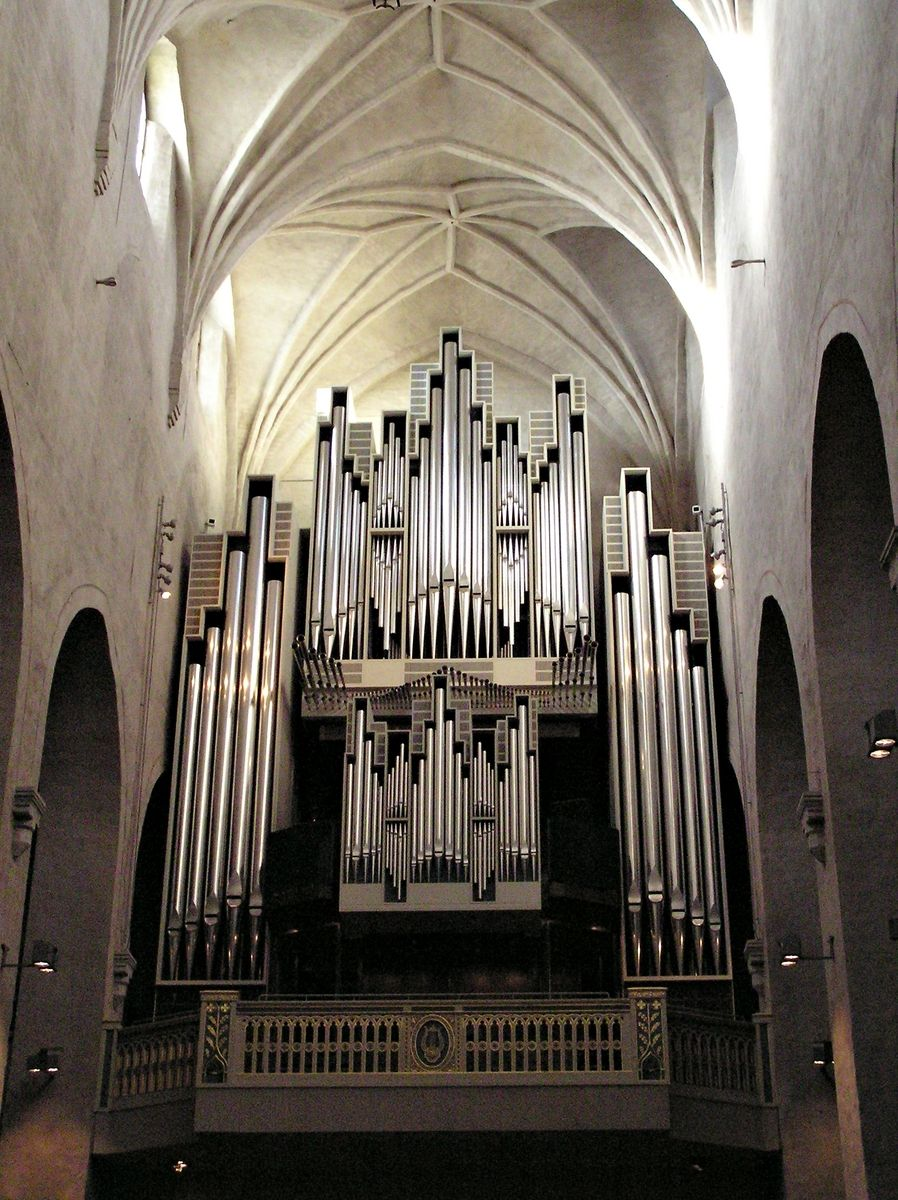
The main organ

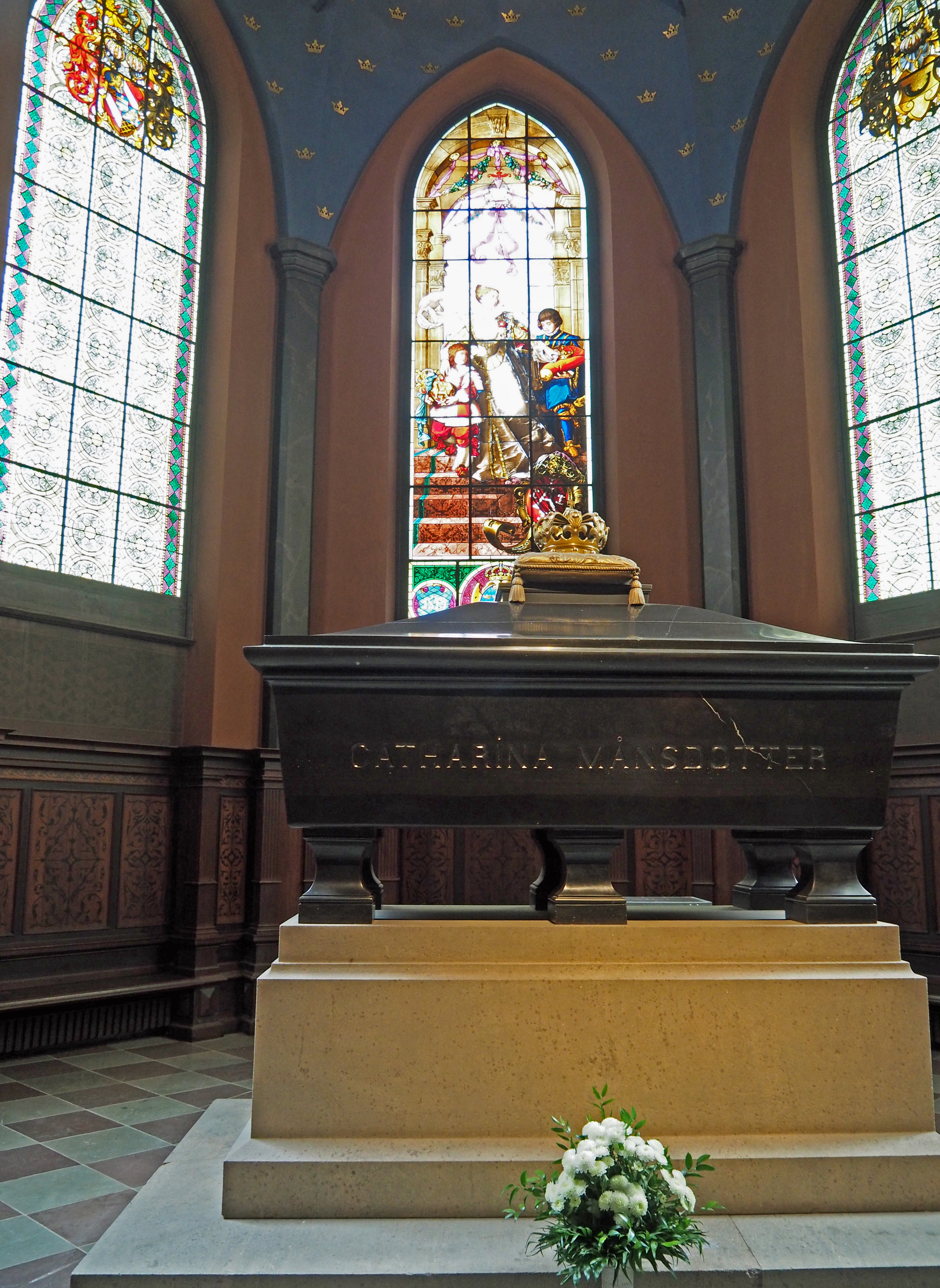
Tomb and burial monument of Catherine Månsdotter, the Queen of Sweden

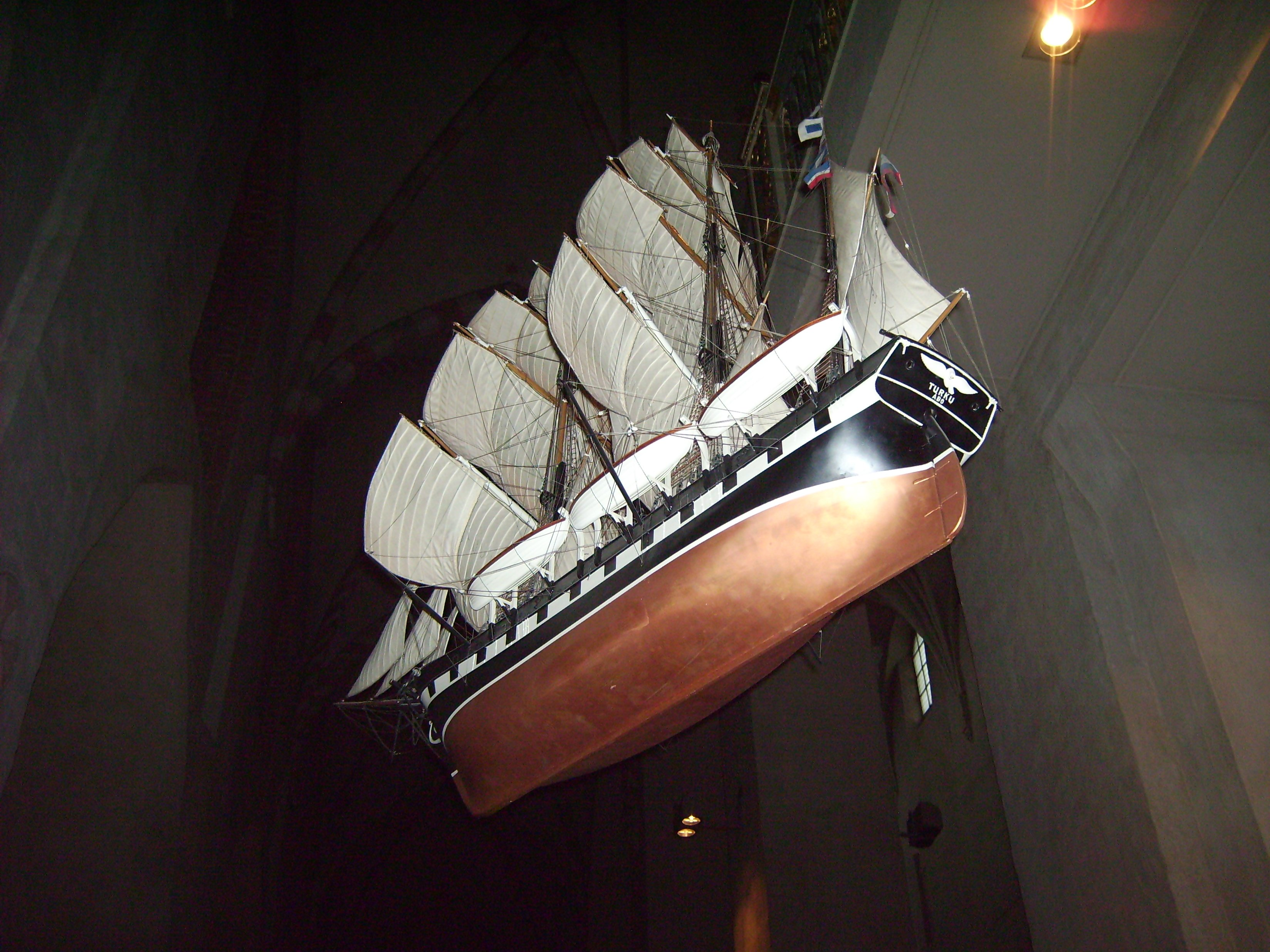
Votive ship

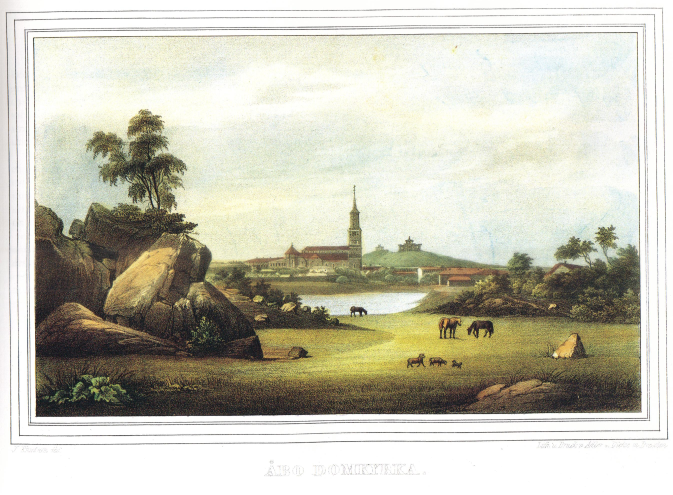
Illustration in Finland framstäldt i teckningar edited by Zacharias Topelius and published 1845-1852.

== See also ==
- Archdiocese of Turku
- History of Turku
- Great Fire of Turku
- Helena Escholin
- List of tallest churches in the world
- Frog coffin
- St. Michael's Church, Turku
