= Royal Academy of Turku =

University in Finland (1640 to 1828); now the University of Helsinki

Coordinates: 60.4516°N 22.2799°E

Royal Academy of Åbo
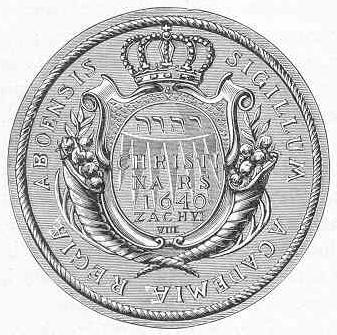
- Seal of the Royal Academy of Åbo
- Latin: Regia Academia Aboensis
- Other names: Royal Academy of Turku
- Active: 1640–1828
- Location: Turku, Southwest Finland
- Re-established as: University of Helsinki

The Royal Academy of Turku or the Royal Academy of Åbo (Note: Swedish: Kungliga Akademien i Åbo or Åbo Kungliga Akademi; Latin: Regia Academia Aboensis; Finnish: Turun akatemia) was the first university in Finland, and the only Finnish university that was founded when the country still was a part of Sweden. It was founded in 1640. In 1809, after Finland became a grand duchy within the Russian Empire, it was renamed the Imperial Academy of Turku. In 1828, after the Great Fire of Turku, the institution was moved to Helsinki, in line with the relocation of the capital of the grand duchy. It was finally renamed the University of Helsinki when Finland declared independence in 1917.

== History ==
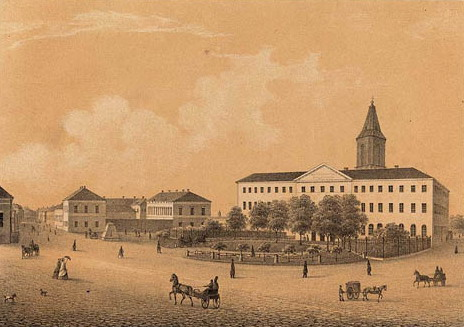
The Royal Academy before the city was destroyed by the Great Fire in 1827.

The academy was founded on 26 March 1640 by Queen Christina of Sweden at the proposal of Count Per Brahe, on base of Åbo Cathedral School (founded 1276). It was the third university in the Swedish Empire, following Uppsala University (founded 1477) and the Academia Gustaviana (now the University of Tartu in Estonia) (1632).

The first printing shop in Finland was established at the academy in 1642. The printer was Peder Walde.

Finland's first scientific society, Societas pro Fauna et Flora Fennica, was founded on 1 November 1821 by Carl Reinhold Sahlberg alongside eight mostly undergraduate biologists at the university.

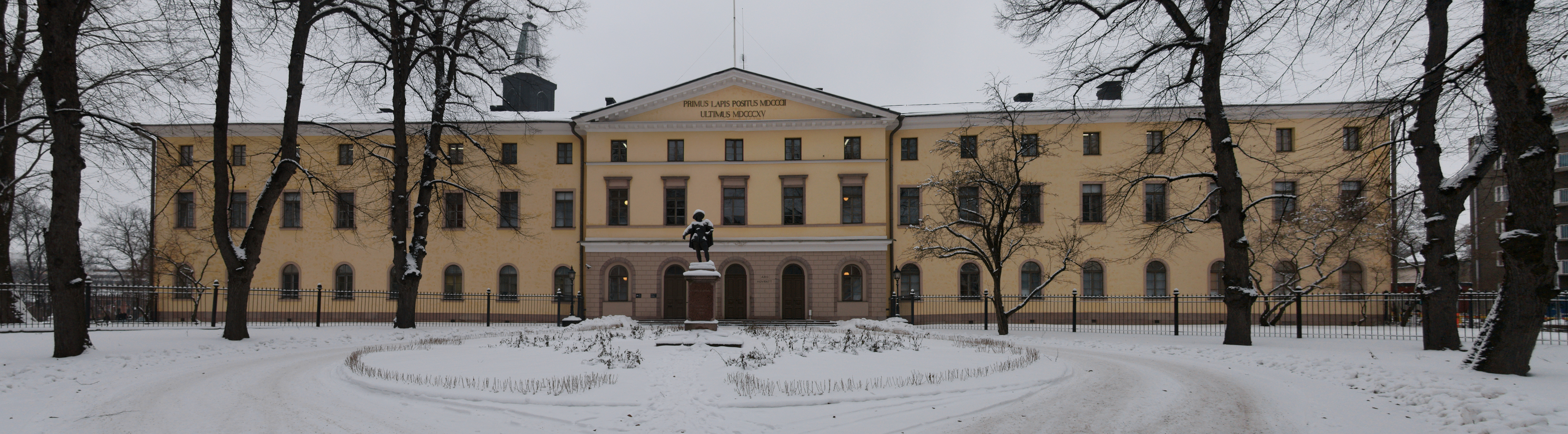
The Academy Building (1815). After the academy was moved to Helsinki, the building is since 1830 the seat of the Turku Court of Appeal.

Turku (or Åbo in Swedish) was the largest city in Finland and among the three largest in Sweden, while under Swedish sovereignty. In 1809, Finland was ceded to Russia and the capital of the new Grand Duchy of Finland was relocated to Helsinki in 1812, as Turku was regarded as being too remote from Saint Petersburg — and too near to Stockholm. As a result of the Great Fire of Turku of 1827, which devastated most of the city and also badly damaged the university, the government offices that had remained were finally moved to the new capital, and so also was the university. It continued in Helsinki, first as the Imperial Alexander University in Finland, and, following Finland's independence in 1917, as the University of Helsinki.

There are two universities in Turku today: the Swedish-speaking Åbo Akademi University (founded in 1918) and the Finnish-speaking University of Turku (1920), which both sometimes may claim an academic tradition at the location since the 17th century, in spite of a break for almost a century.

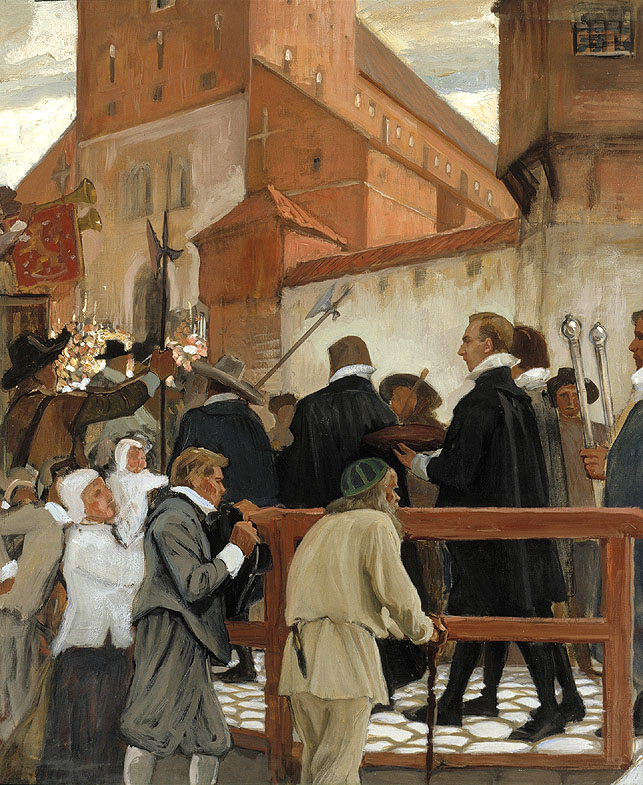
Inauguration of the Turku Academy Part 1 (Albert Edelfelt, 1902, painting in the ballroom of the University of Helsinki)

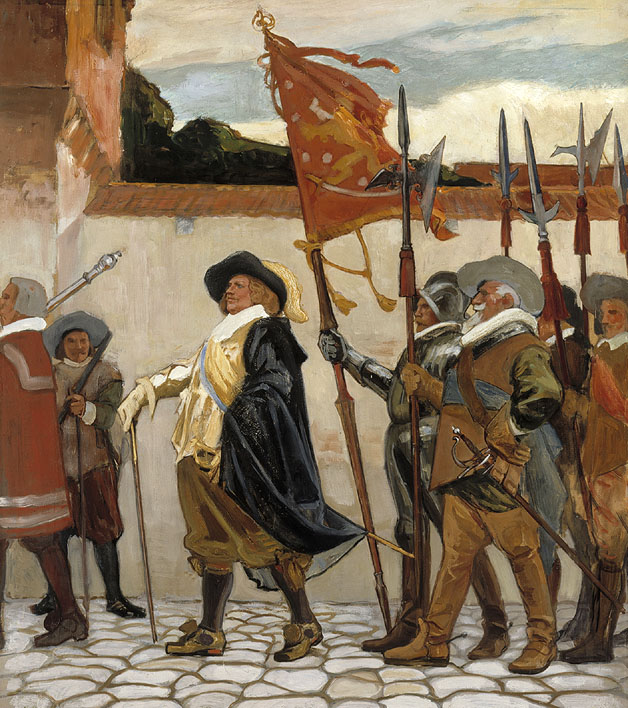
Inauguration of the Turku Academy Part 2

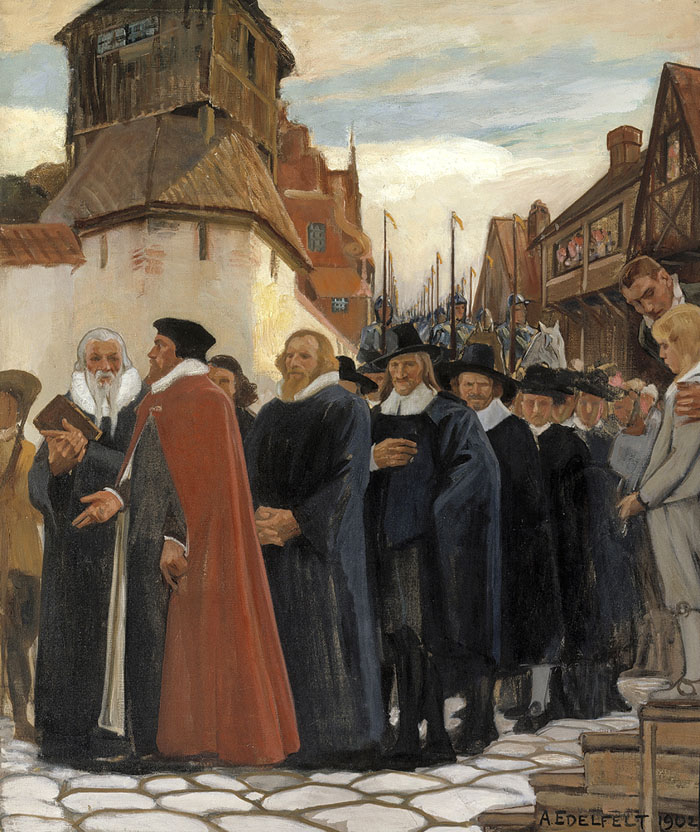
Inauguration of the Turku Academy Part 3

== See also ==
- List of early modern universities in Europe
- List of universities in Finland (present-day universities)
