= Archdiocese of Turku =

Part of the Evangelical Lutheran Church of Finland

Archdiocese of Turku Turun arkkihiippakunta Åbo ärkestift
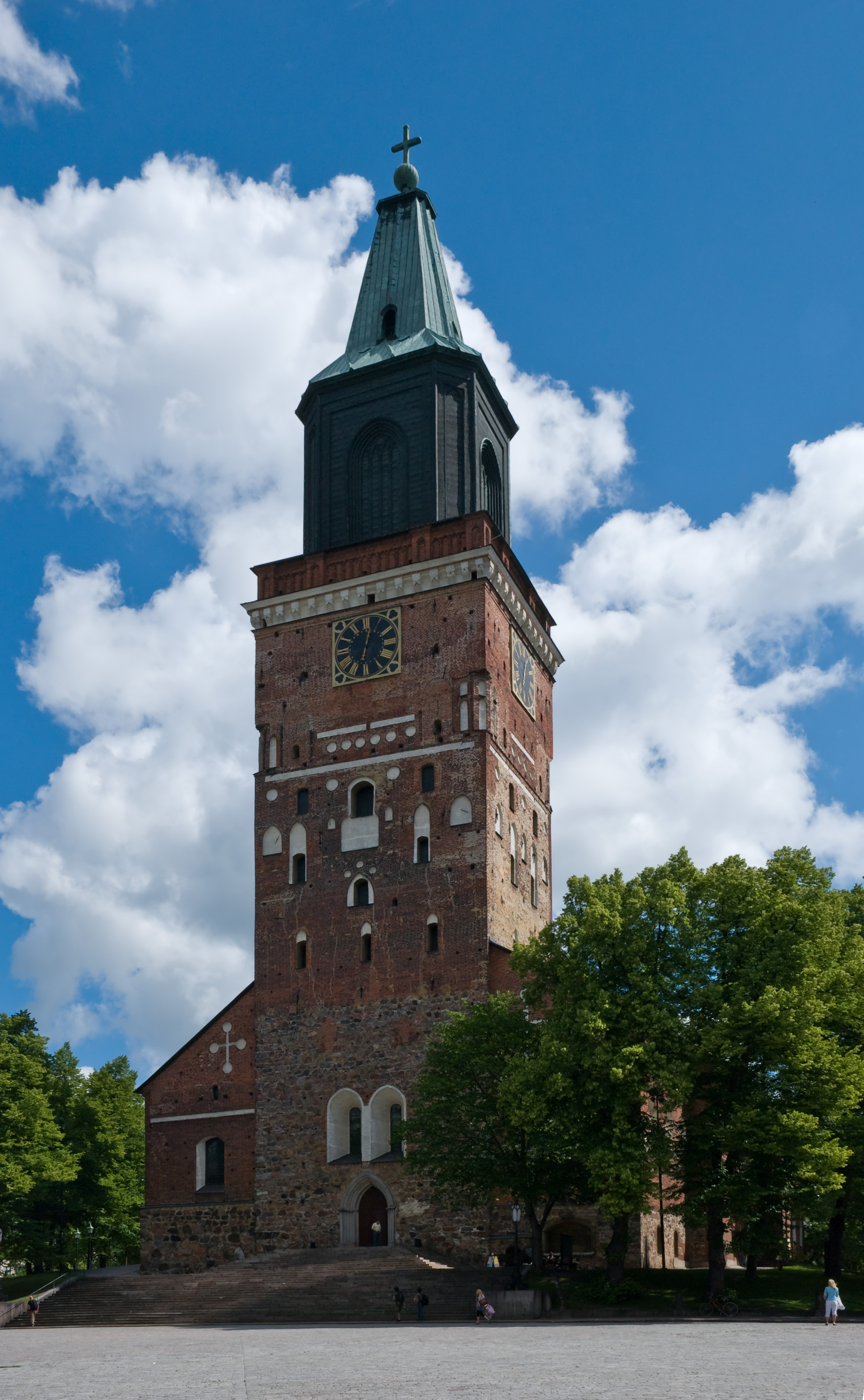
- Turku Cathedral

Location
- Country: Finland
- Ecclesiastical province: Turku & Finland
- Metropolitan: Archbishop of Turku & Finland
- Deaneries: 5

Statistics
- Parishes: 51

Information
- Denomination: Evangelical Lutheran Church of Finland
- Established: 12th Century
- Cathedral: Turku Cathedral

Current leadership
- Bishops: Mari Leppänen
- Metropolitan Archbishop: Tapio Luoma
- Bishops emeritus: Kaarlo Kalliala

Website
- www.arkkihiippakunta.fi

The Archdiocese of Turku (Finnish: Turun arkkihiippakunta, Swedish: Åbo ärkestift), historically known as Archdiocese of Åbo, is the seat of the Archbishop of Turku. It is a part of the Evangelical Lutheran Church of Finland, and its see city is Turku.

The Archbishop has many administrative tasks relating to the National church, and is the Metropolitan and Primate of the church. In common with other Lutheran and Anglican churches the Archbishop is considered primus inter pares while all diocesan bishops retain their independence within their respective jurisdictions. This also applies to the Bishop of Turku Archdiocese. The Archdiocese of Turku has a unique episcopal structure, as there are two bishops in the Diocese.

== History ==
Influenced by papal bulls, Swedish magnates in the 12th century set up crusading expeditions to convert the heathens in the eastern Baltic. This resulted in the establishment of the Catholic Church, the Christian religion and the Swedish conquest of southern Finland in 1249. Turku, or Åbo, became the principal city in Finland and residence of a Bishopric (the Bishopric of Turku; or episcopus Aboensis). As a result of Protestant Reformation in the 16th century, the Catholic Church had to give way for the Lutheran state church that was established by King Gustav Vasa of Sweden. The principal ecclesiastical reformer in Finland was Mikael Agricola who from 1554 onward was also the Bishop of the Turku Diocese.

After the Finnish War in 1809, Finland became a part of the Russian Empire as an autonomous Grand Duchy. In 1817 the Bishop was elevated to the status of Archbishop and thus became the head of the Church in Finland. The Lutheran Church thereby became the state church of the Grand Duchy. In 1870, the church was detached from the state as a separate judicial entity. After Finland had gained independence in 1917, through the constitution of 1919 and the act on religious freedom of 1922 the Evangelical Lutheran Church of Finland became a national church of Finland (along with the Finnish Orthodox Church, which however did not get a constitutional position).

== Archbishop of Turku and Finland ==
The bishopric of Turku was elevated to an archbishopric in 1817. Since then, the Ordinary has held the full official title of Archbishop of Turku and Finland. There has been an unbroken succession of archbishops in Finland. Since the retirement of Archbishop Kari Mäkinen in 2018, Tapio Luoma has been the incumbent Archbishop of Turku and Finland. He previously served as the Bishop of Espoo (2012–2018).

== Bishop of Turku Archdiocese ==
Since 1998, there have been two diocesan bishops in the Turku Archdiocese: the Bishop of Turku Archdiocese and the Archbishop of Turku and Finland. Neither of the two is a suffragan as there are no suffragan bishops in the Evangelical Lutheran Church of Finland. Episcopal oversight of the Archdiocese is shared between the Bishop and the Archbishop. According to the decision of the ELCF General Synod, the area of the primary oversight of the Bishop of Turku Archdiocese consists of 42 parishes, whereas the Archbishop's primary diocesan oversight covers the deanery of Turku which consists of 9 parishes. Moreover, the Bishop of Turku Archdiocese is in charge of the day-to-day running of the Diocesan Chapter. This arrangement allows for the Archbishop to take a leading role on the national and international ecclesiastical stages. Since 2021, the incumbent Bishop of Turku Archdiocese has been Mari Leppänen

== See also ==
- List of bishops of Turku
- Turku Cathedral
- List of Lutheran dioceses and archdioceses
