= Nils Rosén =

Nils Rosén may refer to:

- Nils Rosén von Rosenstein, professor of medicine at Uppsala University
- Nils von Rosenstein, son of the previous, first secretary of the Swedish Academy
- Nils Rosén (footballer), member of the Swedish team at the 1934 FIFA World Cup
- Nils Rosén (zoologist), Swedish zoologist
