= Måns von Rosenstein =

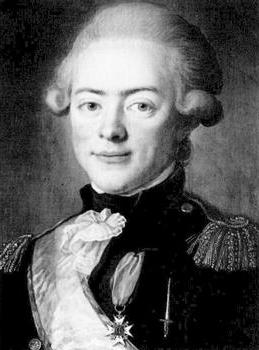
- Born: Magnus Aurivillius; 9 March 1755; Uppsala, Sweden
- Died: 14 November 1801 (aged 46); Uppsala, Sweden
- Burial place: Uppsala old cemetery
- Relatives: Carl von Rosenstein (brother); Nils Rosén von Rosenstein (grandfather); Nils von Rosenstein (uncle)
- Military career
- Branch: Swedish Navy (1771–76, 1783–97); Royal Navy (1776–78); French Navy (1779–82)
- Service years: 1771–1797
- Rank: Rear Admiral
- Commands: Gripen; Oden; Bellona
- Conflicts: Anglo-French War: Battle of Ushant; American Revolutionary War: Battle of the Saintes; Russo-Swedish War: Battle of Svensksund

Magnus "Måns" Rosén von Rosenstein (born Aurivillius; 9 March 1755 – 14 November 1801) was a Swedish Navy rear admiral. After having served in the Fleet of the Army, Rosenstein joined the Royal Navy in the American Revolutionary War against the French. He then joined the French Navy and took part in the Battle of the Saintes where he was taken prisoner by his former commander Admiral Sir Peter Parker and was imprisoned in England. He was immediately released, returned to Sweden and would later distinguish himself in the Battle of Svensksund. Rosenstein retired with the rank of rear admiral in the Swedish Navy in 1797 and died in his hometown of Uppsala in 1801.

== Early life ==
Rosenstein was born in Uppsala, Sweden, the son of professor of medicine Samuel Aurivillius and his wife Anna Margareta Rosén von Rosenstein, whose children were knighted in 1773 and adopted their grandfather's, archiater Nils Rosén von Rosenstein, noble name, but under a special number (No 2055) introduced at the House of Nobility in 1776. Rosenstein became furir at the age of ten at Uppland Regiment in 1765 and was promoted to sergeant in the Sveaborg Squadron of the Fleet of the Army in 1770 and became styckjunkare the same year. He was promoted to fänrik in 1771 and to löjtnant in 1774. According to the custom of the time, he obtained a letter of appointment at the age of ten and took leave together with several other officers from the Fleet of the Army for training purposes to join foreign war service in 1776.

== Career ==
Rosenstein served in the Royal Navy 1776–78, where he became a midshipman and took an active part in Sir Peter Parker's squadron in the West Indies and participated in the Battle of Ushant against the French. Only the lack of money had refrained Rosenstein from joining the French Navy, which he did in 1779, the year after his return. As a French naval officer, he participated in the American Revolutionary War and was in the Battle of the Saintes on 12 April 1782 captured by his former commander Admiral Parker and was taken to England, where he nonetheless soon was freed against his word of honor that he would not fight against the English. He left the French Navy in 1783 and on his return to Sweden, adorned with the French *Order of Military Merit, he was immediately appointed sekundmajor in the Stockholm Squadron of the Fleet of the Army and was promoted to lieutenant colonel in 1785.

As captain of the frigate Gripen 1784–85 he carried out an expedition to the Mediterranean and a mission to the Sultan of Morocco. During the outbreak of the Russo-Swedish War in 1788, he received the command of the Galley Squadron's third division. During the Battle of Svensksund on 24 August 1789 he defended the passage aboard the hemmema Oden, until the rest of the fleet managed to escape, when he, after a ten-hour incessant cannonade at last, had to surrender and was taken as a prisoner to Russia. There he was nursed by Catherine the Great's chief physician. After having returned to Sweden, Rosenstein was promoted to colonel in the Swedish Army in 1790 and with the frigate Bellona he carried out a new mission to Morocco in 1791. He was appointed acting commander of the Stockholm Squadron in 1794 and was promoted to rear admiral in 1797.

== Personal life ==
Rosenstein died on 4 November 1801 in his hometown of Uppsala. He was never married.

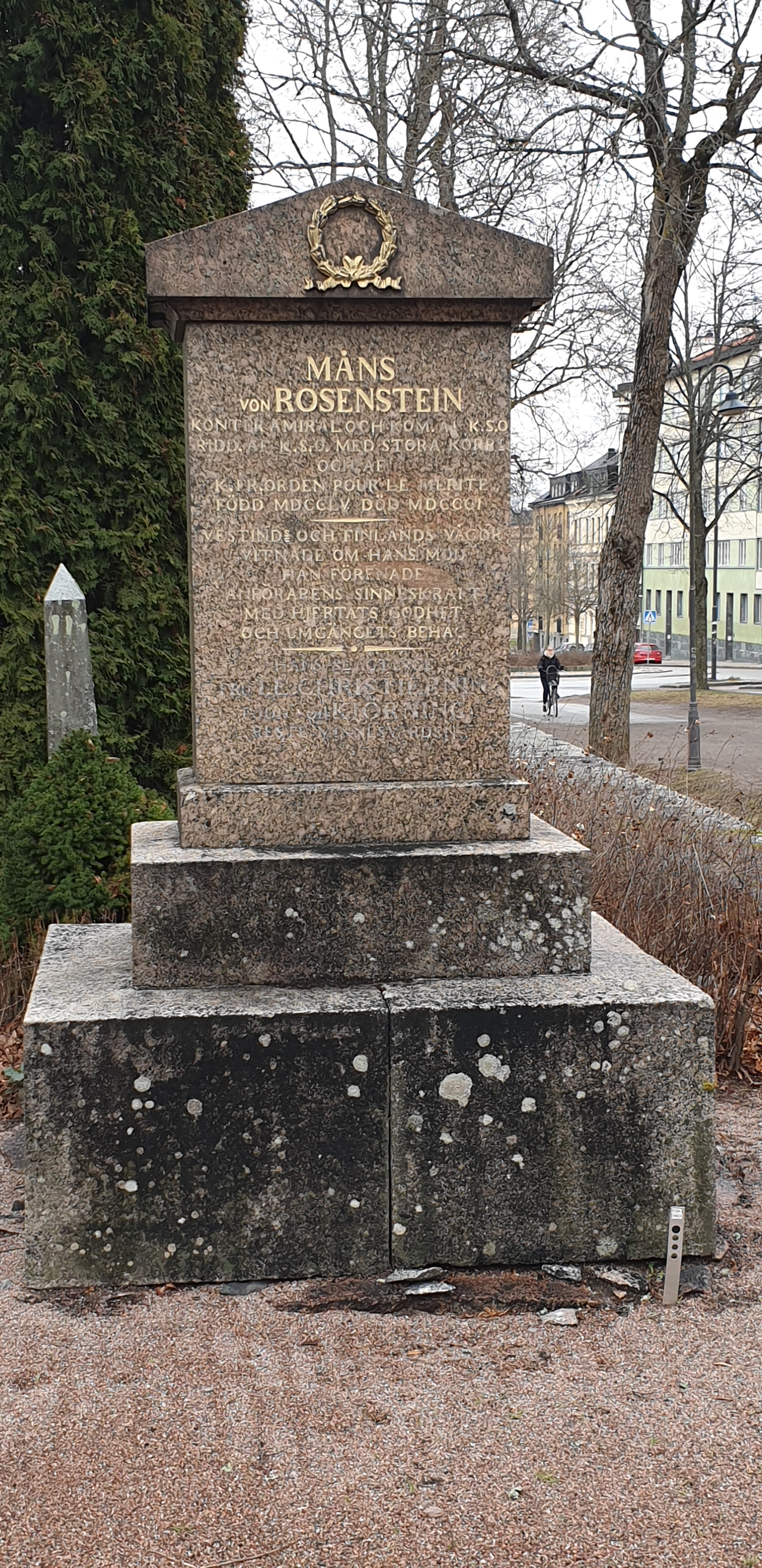
Måns von Rosenstein's grave in Uppsala's old cemetery.

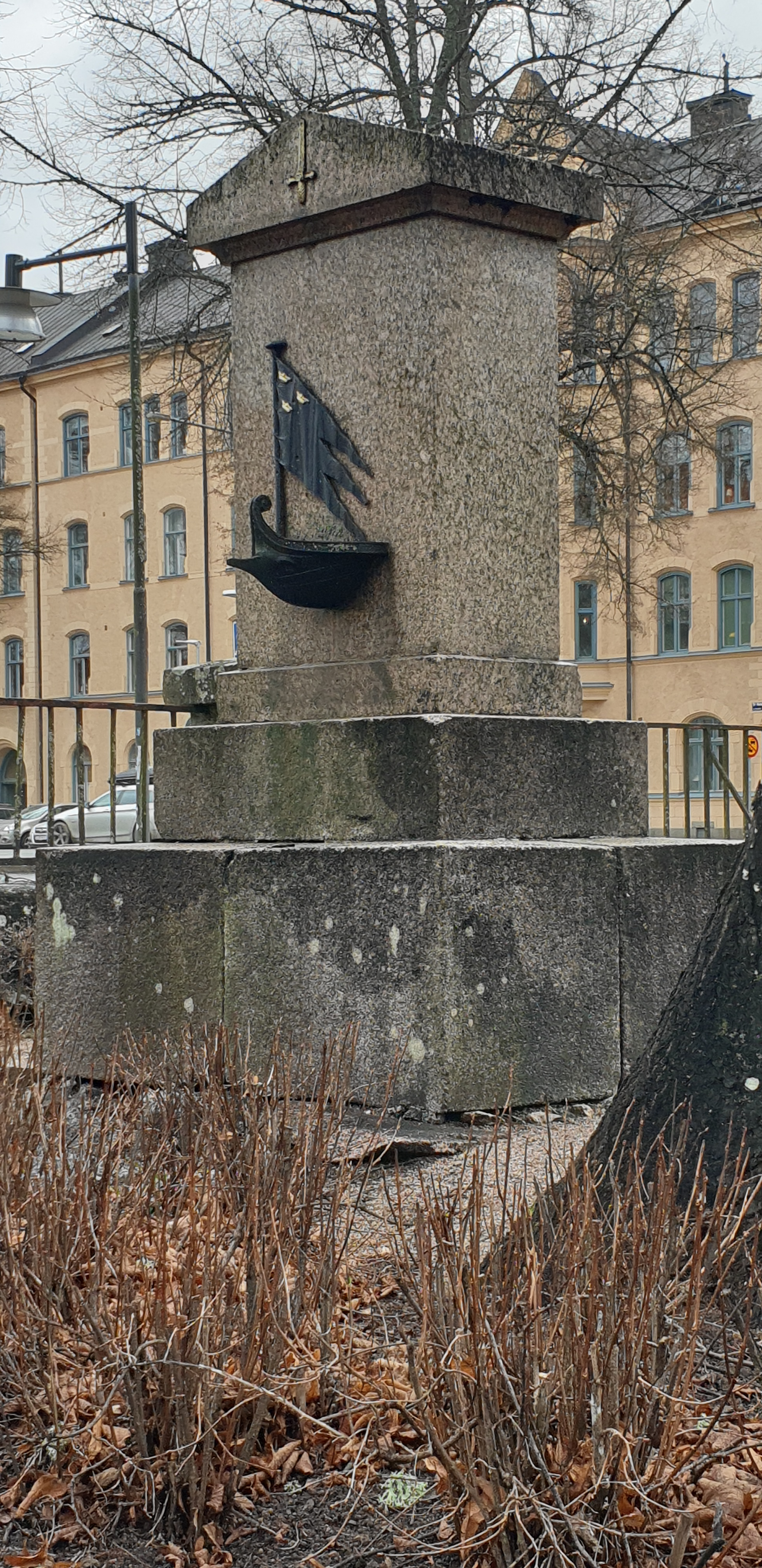
Grave seen from behind.

== Dates of rank ==
- 1765 – Furir
- 1770 – Sergeant
- 1770 – Styckjunkare
- 1771 – Fänrik
- 1774 – Löjtnant
- 1777 – Kapten
- 1783 – Major (Swedish Army)
- 1783 – Sekundmajor (Swedish Navy)
- 1785 – Överstelöjtnant
- 1790 – Överste (Swedish Army)
- 1797 – Konteramiral

== Awards and decorations ==
- Commander of the Order of the Sword (1799)
- Knight Grand Cross of the Order of the Sword (1790)
- Knight of the Order of the Sword (1781)
- Order of Military Merit (1781)
