= Uno von Troil =

Swedish bishop

The Most Reverend Uno von Troil
- Archbishop of Uppsala; Primate of Sweden
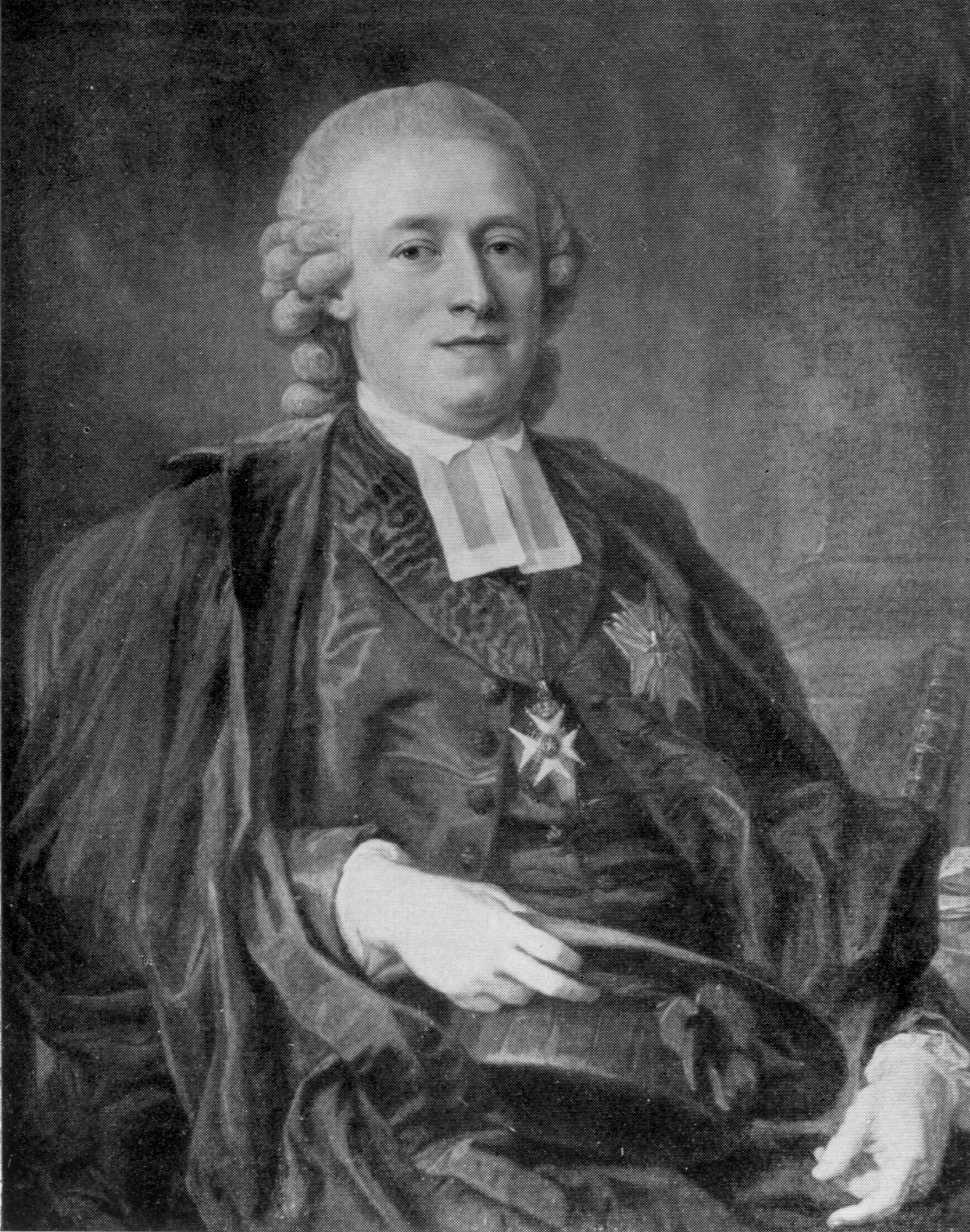
- Uno von Troil painted by Lorens Pasch the younger.
- Church: Church of Sweden
- Archdiocese: Uppsala
- Appointed: 1786
- In office: 1786–1803
- Predecessor: Carl Fredrik Mennander
- Successor: Jakob Axelsson Lindblom
- Previous post: Bishop of Linköping (1780–1786)

Orders
- Ordination: 20 May 1773 by Lars Benzelstierna
- Consecration: 23 February 1781 by Carl Fredrik Mennander
- Rank: Metropolitan Archbishop

Personal details
- Born: 24 February 1746 Stockholm, Sweden
- Died: 27 July 1803 (aged 57) Sätra brunn, Sweden
- Buried: Uppsala old cemetery
- Parents: Samuel Troilius; Anna Elisabeth Angerstein
- Spouse: Elisabet Tersmeden (1776–1794)
- Children: 10
- Education: University of Uppsala

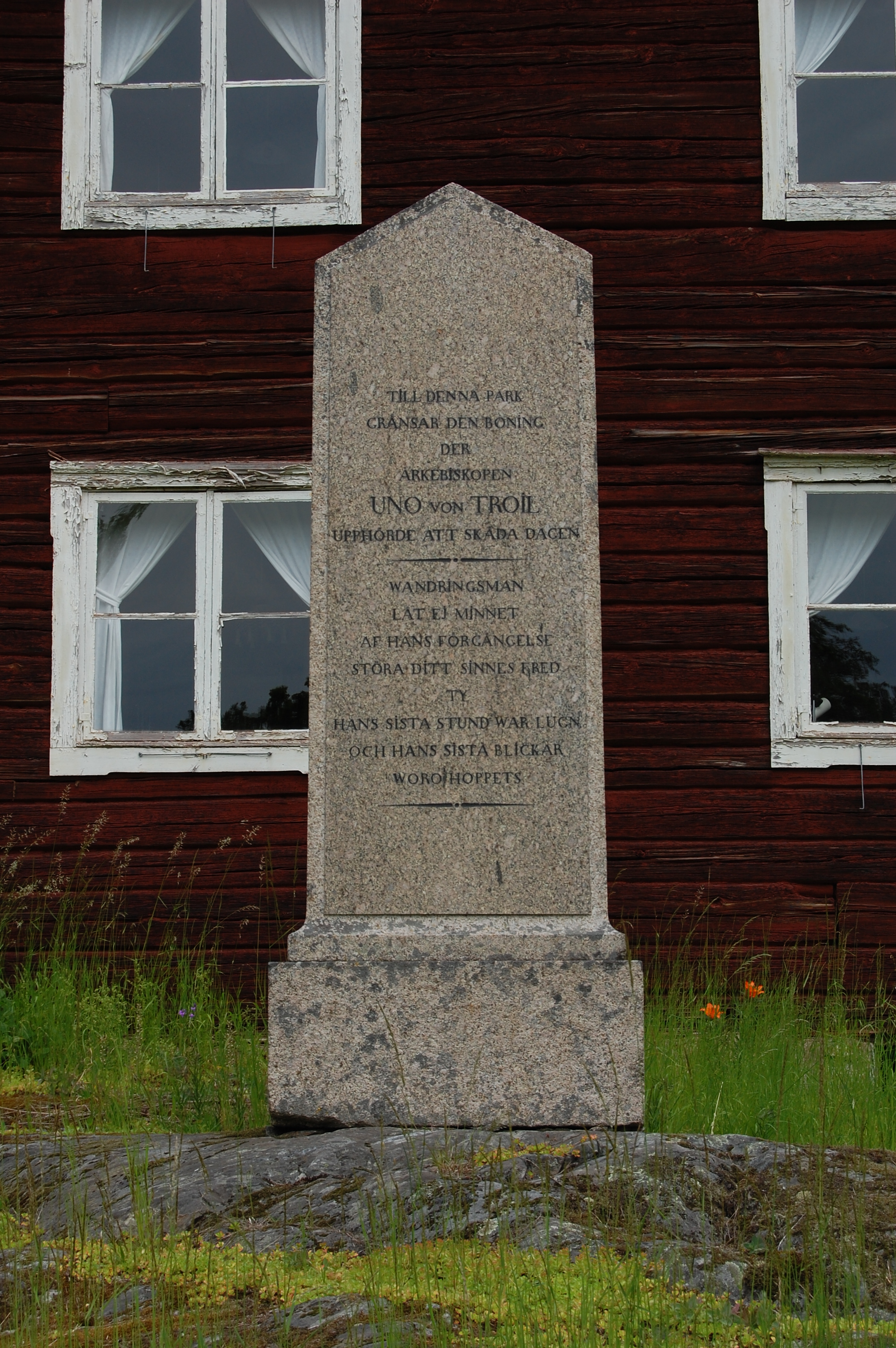
Memorial stone for Uno von Troil on Sätra brunn (spa), placed behind "The new building" (Nybygget), with the inscription in Swedish: "To this park bordering the dwelling where the archbishop Uno von Troil ceased to behold the day. Wanderer, don't let the memory of his pass away disturb your peace of mind, thus his last moment was calm and his last look were hope" (translated roughly from the Swedish article)

Uno von Troil (24 February 1746 in Stockholm – 1803) was the Church of Sweden Archbishop of Uppsala 1786–1803.

== Biography ==
He was the son of Samuel Troilius, who had also been archbishop. He was known for great wit at a young age. After studies and travels abroad to the Netherlands, Göttingen, and Iceland (accompanied by James Lind, Joseph Banks, Daniel Solander and others), he returned home and was ordained priest in 1773. In 1775 he was appointed court chaplain. He married in 1776. In 1778 he became vicar of Storkyrkan church in Stockholm. In 1780 he was consecrated bishop of Linköping. He was appointed as archbishop in 1786, at the age of 40. As such, he was also the Speaker of the Clergy in the Riksdag of the Estates until his death. He was also a member of several scientific societies, and was a benefactor of such throughout his life. He was president of Pro Fide et Christianismo, a Christian education society.

== See also ==
- List of Archbishops of Uppsala

== Other sources ==
- (in Swedish) Svenskt biografiskt handlexikon, article Uno von Troil In Swedish

Preceded by Carl Fredrik Mennander	Archbishop of Uppsala; 1786–1803	Succeeded by Jakob Axelsson Lindblom
