= Tor Andræ =

Swedish bishop and scholar (1885–1947)

The Right Reverend Tor Andrae
- Bishop of Linköping
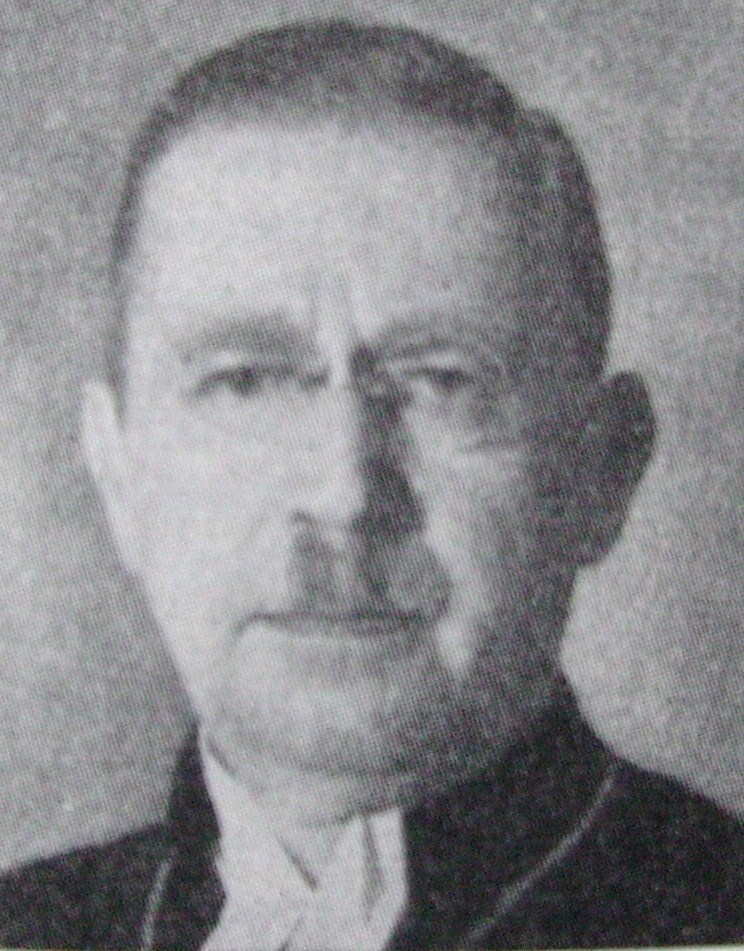
- Church: Church of Sweden
- Diocese: Diocese of Linköping
- In office: 1936–1947
- Predecessor: Erik Aurelius
- Successor: Torsten Ysander

Personal details
- Born: 9 July 1885 Vena, Sweden
- Died: 24 February 1947 (aged 61) Linköping, Sweden
- Spouse: Ellen Gustafsson (1913–1947)
- Children: Håkan Andrae; Staffan Andrae; Anders Johan Andrae; Carl Göran Andræ
- Occupation: Bishop

Tor Julius Efraim Andræ (Swedish: [ˈtuːr anˈdreː]; 9 July 1885 – 24 February 1947) was a Swedish clergyman, professor and scholar of comparative religion who served as Bishop of the Diocese of Linköping.

== Biography ==
Andræ was born at Vena parish in Hultsfred Municipality in Kalmar County, Sweden. He came from a clerical family. He was the son of pastor Anders Johan Andræ and Ida Nilsson. He studied theology at Uppsala University, where he completed his Ph.D. in 1917. As a historian of religion, his particular interest lay in the early history of Islam, particularly its Jewish and Christian origins, and in the psychology of religion, but he also combined these interests in the study of early Islamic mysticism.

He became church pastor at Gamla Uppsala in 1924. Between 1927 and 1929, he served as professor of religious history at Stockholm University and then became professor of theological encyclopedia at Uppsala University. Andræ was a student of Nathan Söderblom, whom he succeeded as member of the Swedish Academy in 1932. He was appointed Bishop of the Diocese of Linköping in 1936 and was the same year briefly minister of education and ecclesiastical affairs in the short-lived cabinet of Prime Minister Axel Pehrsson-Bramstorp. He died during 1947 in Linköping and was buried at Uppsala gamla kyrkogård.

His study of Muhammad

In 1985, Annemarie Schimmel remarked that until then only one study had "tried specifically to depict Muhammad's role in Islamic piety. Even today Tor Andrae's Die person Muhammeds in lehre und glaube seiner Gemeinde (1918) remains the standard work in this area, unsuperseded by any other major study, though complemented by random remarks in numerous modern work on Sufism. It is, however, unfortunately too little known even among Islamicists."

Cultural offices
Preceded by Nathan Söderblom	Swedish Academy, Seat No 16; 1932–1947	Succeeded by Elias Wessén
