= Petrus Benedicti =

Swedish bishop

The Right Reverend Petrus Benedicti Oelandus
- Bishop of Linköping
- Church: Church of Sweden
- Diocese: Linköping
- In office: 1589–1606
- Predecessor: Petrus Caroli
- Successor: Jonas Kylander

Orders
- Consecration: 8 September 1583 by Andreas Laurentii Björnram

Personal details
- Born: 1531
- Died: 1606 (aged 74–75)
- Denomination: Lutheran
- Spouse: Magdalena Persdotter
- Children: 1

Petrus Benedicti Oelandus (1531–1606) also called Ölandus was a Swedish prelate who was the Bishop of Linköping from 1589 till 1606.
