= Johannes Steuchius =

Swedish bishop and archbishop

The Most Reverend Johannes Steuchius
- Archbishop of Uppsala; Primate of Sweden
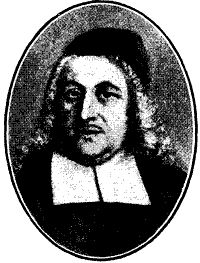
- Church: Church of Sweden
- Archdiocese: Uppsala
- Appointed: 1730
- In office: 1730–1742
- Predecessor: Mathias Steuchius
- Successor: Erik Benzelius the younger
- Previous post: Bishop of Linköping (1730)

Orders
- Ordination: 5 March 1709
- Consecration: 1730 by Mathias Steuchius
- Rank: Metropolitan Archbishop

Personal details
- Born: 3 January 1676 Härnösand, Sweden
- Died: 21 June 1742 (aged 66) Uppsala, Sweden
- Denomination: Lutheran
- Parents: Mathias Steuchius; Anna Tersera
- Spouse: Elisabet Spegel (1705–1720); Ulrica Eleonora Franc (1724–1725)
- Children: 9
- Education: Uppsala University

Johannes Steuchius (3 January 1676 – 21 June 1742) was Archbishop of Uppsala in the Church of Sweden from 1730 to his death.

== Biography ==
He was born in Härnösand, the son of Archbishop Mathias Steuchius (1644–1730) . His family surname was ennobled in 1719 to Steuch. He was enrolled at Uppsala University in 1692 and in 1695 at Lund University. Steuchius received a doctorate in philosophy at Uppsala in 1700 and in 1701, he took up a position as professor and librarian at Lund University. In 1707 he returned to Uppsala University where he was appointed professor of metaphysics and logic as well as extra ordinary professor of theology.

Steuchius left academic life in 1723, when he was appointed superintendent of the Diocese of Karlstad In 1730, he was appointed bishop of the Diocese of Linköping however following the subsequent the death of his father, he was appointed to succeed him as Archbishop of Uppsala.

== Other sources ==
- Nordisk familjebok, article Steuchius
- Entry of Johannes Steuchius in the Rostock Matrikelportal
