= Jacob Axelsson Lindblom =

Swedish scholar and professor

The Most Reverend Jacob Axelsson Lindblom
- Archbishop of Uppsala; Primate of Sweden
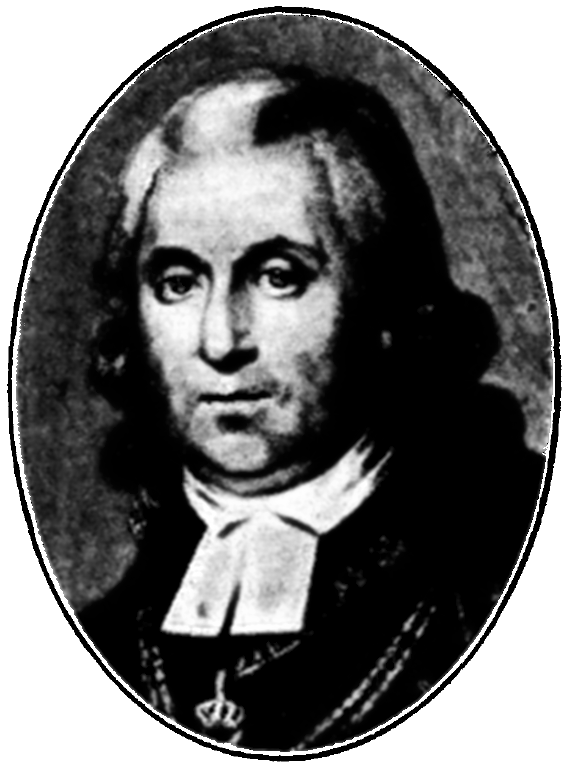
- Church: Church of Sweden
- Archdiocese: Uppsala
- Appointed: 1805
- In office: 1805–1819
- Predecessor: Uno von Troil
- Successor: Carl von Rosenstein
- Previous post: Bishop of Linköping (1786–1805)

Orders
- Ordination: 19 December 1786 by Uno von Troil
- Consecration: 1 March 1787 by Uno von Troil
- Rank: Metropolitan Archbishop

Personal details
- Born: 27 July 1746 Skeda, Östergötland, Sweden
- Died: 2 December 1836 (aged 60) Uppsala, Sweden
- Parents: Axel Johan Lindblom; Regina Margaretha Pallavicini
- Spouse: Margareta Fondin (1780–1783); Sofia Ulrica Söderberg (1784–1819)
- Children: Lars Axel Lindblom; Gustaf Adolf Lindblom
- Education: University of Uppsala

Jacob Axelsson Lindblom (27 July 1746 – 15 February 1819) was a Swedish scholar and professor who became Archbishop of Uppsala, a position he held between 1805 and 1819.

== Biography ==
Axelsson Lindblom was born at Skeda in Östergötland, the son of a clergyman. He received his secondary education at Linköping gymnasium and matriculated at Uppsala University in 1763. He became student of the philologist Johan Ihre and the Latinist Petrus Ekerman (1696–1783) who was also inspector of the student society Östgöta nation (Uppsala).

He worked as a tutor for a noble family in Livonia from 1764 to 1766, came back to Uppsala where he completed his magister degree in 1770. After having worked as a docent and a librarian at the university library, he became an extraordinary professor in 1779 and was appointed to the Skyttean professorship of Eloquence and Political Science in 1781, after the death of his teacher Johan Ihre. Axelsson Lindblom published a History of Roman Literature (Illustriores linguæ Romanæ critici) and collaborated with Ihre on a Lexicon Latino-Svecanum, which he was eventually to complete in 1790. He published prolifically historical, literary and other topics, but is not regarded as particularly original in his scholarly production.

Axelsson Lindblom was a favorite of King Gustavus III, who made him Bishop of Linköping in December 1786, nor withstanding the fact he had never been ordained, a situation remedied a few days after the appointment. As bishop he succeeded Uno von Troil, who had been made Archbishop of Uppsala, and in 1805 he succeeded von Troil as archbishop of Uppsala as well, an appointment which also made him pro-chancellor of the university.

He was elected a member of the Swedish Academy in 1809, and was awarded a knighthood in the Order of Seraphim in 1818. His children were raised to the nobility with a change of surname to Lindersköld.

== Other sources ==
- Nordisk familjebok, vol. 16 (1912), col. 588f (in Swedish)

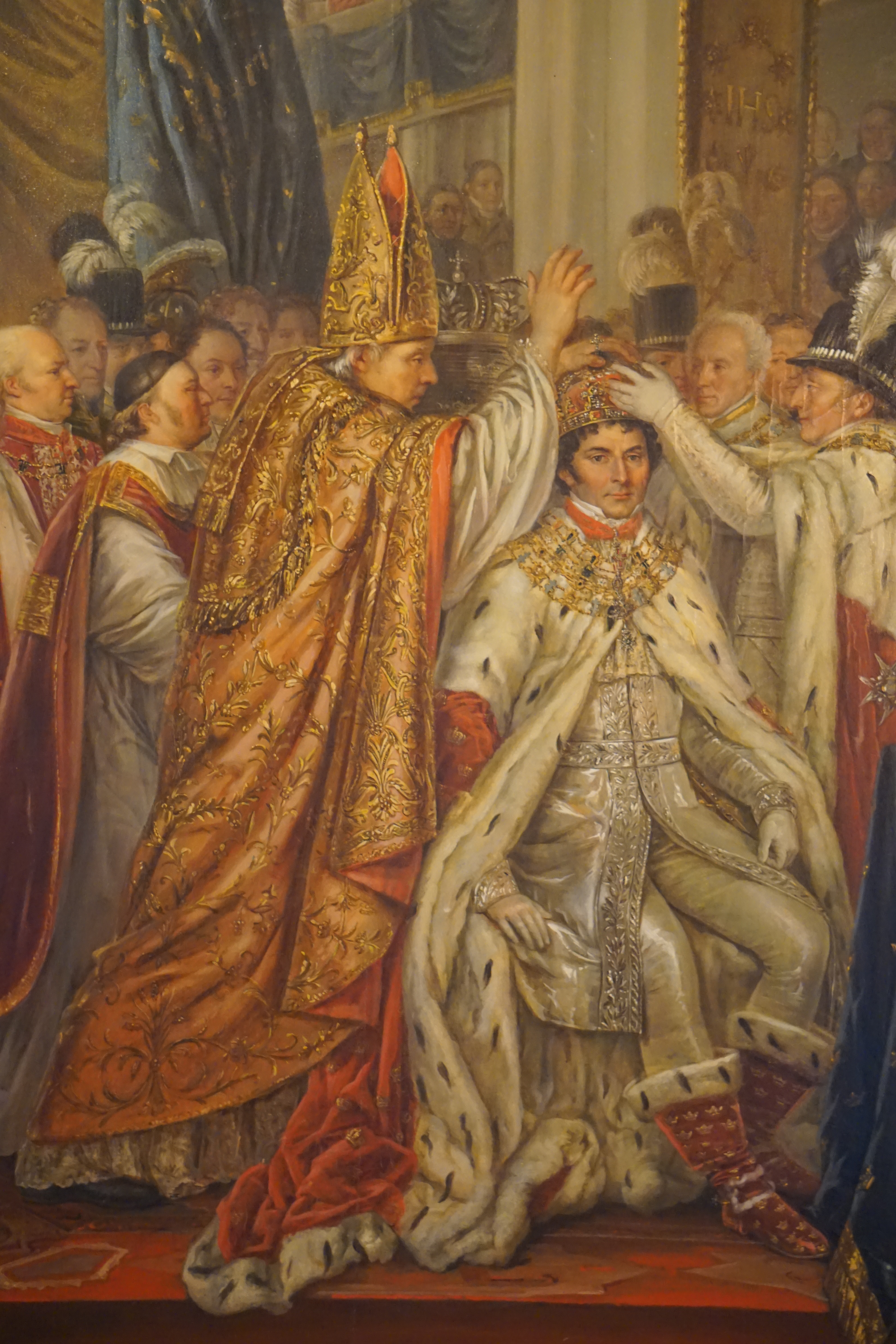
Karl XIV Johans kröning by Per Krafft the Younger (1818) depicting the coronation of Charles XIV John by Archbishop of Uppsala Jacob Axelsson Lindblom

Religious titles
Preceded by Uno von Troil	Bishop of Linköping; 1786–1805	Succeeded by Magnus Lehnberg
Preceded by Uno von Troil	Archbishop of Uppsala; 1805–1819	Succeeded by Carl von Rosenstein
Cultural offices
Preceded by Magnus Lehnberg	Swedish Academy, Seat No 5; 1809–1819	Succeeded by Carl von Rosenstein
