= Mathias Steuchius =

Swedish bishop and archbishop

The Most Reverend Mathias Steuchius
- Archbishop of Uppsala; Primate of Sweden
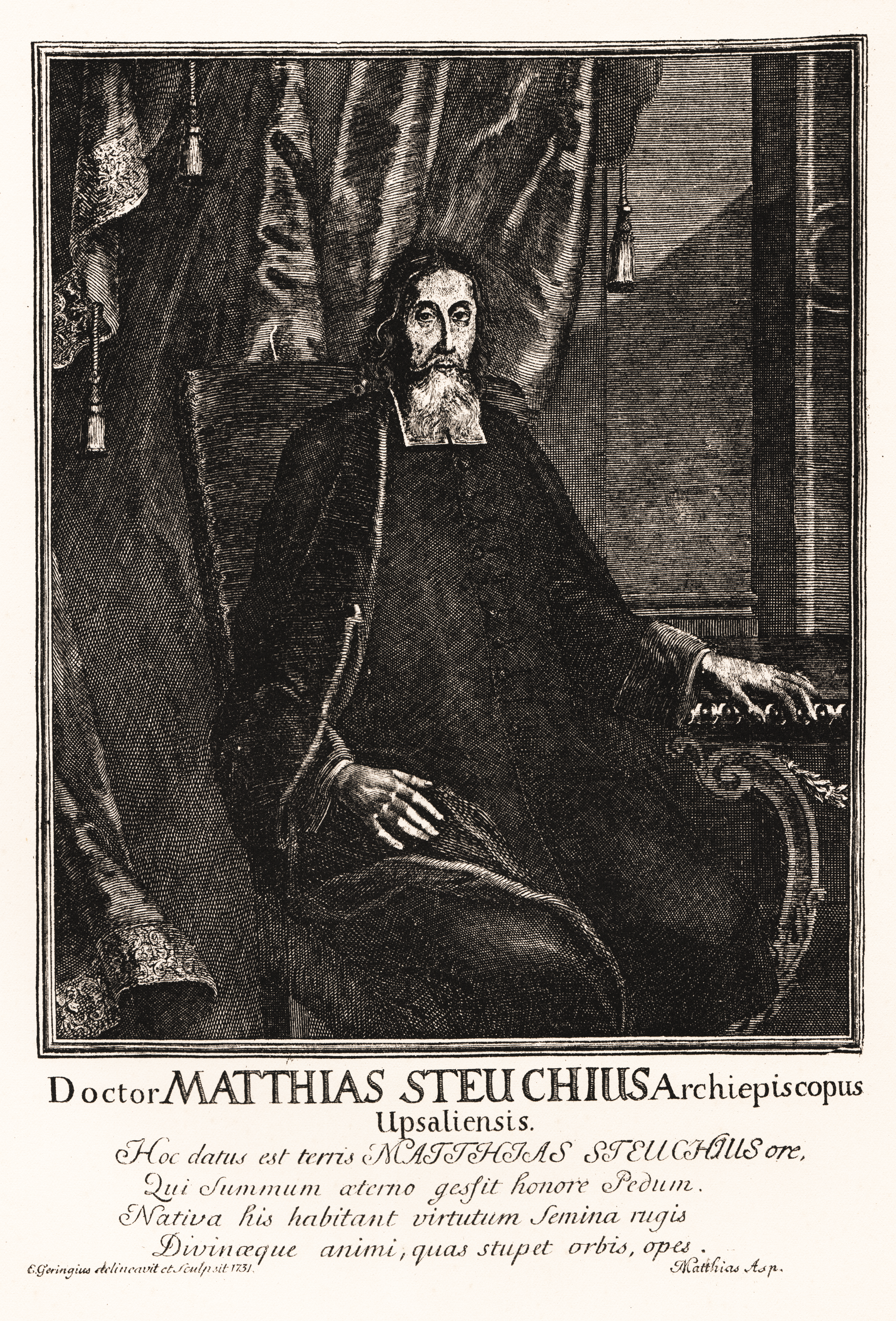
- Church: Church of Sweden
- Archdiocese: Uppsala
- Appointed: 1714
- In office: 1714–1730
- Predecessor: Haquin Spegel
- Successor: Johannes Steuchius
- Previous post: Bishop of Lund (1695–1714)

Orders
- Ordination: 1672 by Petrus Steuchius
- Consecration: 12 June 1695 by Olov Svebilius
- Rank: Metropolitan Archbishop

Personal details
- Born: 26 October 1644 Fogdö, Sweden
- Died: 2 August 1730 (aged 85) Uppsala, Sweden
- Parents: Petrus Steuchius; Brita Ilsbodinia
- Spouse: Anna Tersera
- Education: Uppsala University

Mathias Steuchius (Swedish pronunciation: ['stø:kɪɵs]; 26 October 1644 – 2 August 1730) was Bishop of the Diocese of Lund, 1694 to 1714 and Archbishop of Uppsala in the Swedish Church from 1714 to his death.

Steuchius was born in Fogdö, and grew up in Härnösand in northern Sweden, where his father Petrus Steuchius was superintendent. He was ordained a priest in 1672 and participated in the Riksdag of the Estates in 1672 and 1675 In 1676 he became professor of logic and metaphysics at the Uppsala University. He married in 1680. In 1683 his father died, and Steuchius superseded him. He worked as superintendent for twelve years, and put much effort into converting the Sami people.

In 1693 he was made doctor of theology in Uppsala, and in 1694 promoted to professor. But by June 1694 he was summoned to Lund, to be appointed Bishop of Lund.

At the death of Haquin Spegel, Steuchius was elected new archbishop in 1714. He worked in Uppsala until his death in 1730.

Steuchius was known as a devoted and righteous man by his way of living and teaching.

== See also ==
- List of Archbishops of Uppsala
