= Haquin Spegel =

Swedish bishop and archbishop (1645–1714)

The Most Reverend Haquin Spegel
- Archbishop of Uppsala; Primate of Sweden
- Haquin Spegel, engraving from 1715
- Church: Church of Sweden
- Archdiocese: Uppsala
- Appointed: 1711
- In office: 1711–1714
- Predecessor: Erik Benzelius the elder
- Successor: Mathias Steuchius
- Previous posts: Bishop of Skara (1685–1693); Bishop of Linköping (1693–1711)

Orders
- Consecration: 1685 by Olov Svebilius
- Rank: Metropolitan Archbishop

Personal details
- Born: 14 June 1645 Ronneby, Sweden
- Died: 17 April 1714 (aged 68) Uppsala, Sweden
- Denomination: Lutheran
- Parents: Daniel Spegel; Margareta Fischer
- Spouse: Anna Schultin
- Education: Lund University

Haquin Spegel (Haqvin) (born Håkan Spegel; 14 June 1645 – 17 April 1714) was a Swedish religious author and hymn writer who held several bishop's seats.

== Biography ==
Spegel was born on 14 June 1645, in Ronneby. In 1675, the King Charles XI of Sweden appointed him as court chaplain. During the wars in the following years, he followed the King, and became a close confidant of his. He kept a diary during the whole time, which has proven to be valuable as research material.

In 1680, he wed Queen Ulrika Eleonora and the King. He spent the following five years mainly on the island of Gotland as a superintendent over the Diocese of Visby. He managed to write the Rudera Gothlandica during this time (published first 1901).

In 1685, he was appointed Bishop of Linköping in eastern Sweden. In 1693, he was transferred to the seat in Diocese of Skara, central Sweden, where he remained until 1711. On the death of the Archbishop of Uppsala, Spegel was elected his successor, although he only held this position for three years.

During that time, he wrote an influential epos called God's work and rest about God's creation as written about in the Bible.

== Other notability ==
It is said that he worked for education of the people, and wanted every peasant in Sweden to be able to read.

He was also known as a hymnist and poet.
