= Lars Stigzelius =

Swedish religious leader

The Most Reverend Laurentius Stigzelius
- Archbishop of Uppsala; Primate of Sweden
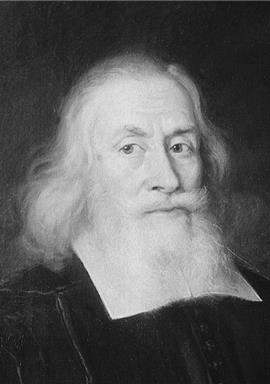
- Church: Church of Sweden
- Archdiocese: Uppsala
- Appointed: 1670
- In office: 1670–1676
- Predecessor: Johannes Canuti Lenaeus
- Successor: Johan Baazius the younger

Orders
- Consecration: 1670 by Samuel Enander
- Rank: Metropolitan Archbishop

Personal details
- Born: 27 October 1598 Stigsjö, Ångermanland, Sweden
- Died: 31 August 1676 (aged 77) Uppsala, Sweden
- Parents: Matthias Helgonis & Katarina Eriksdotter
- Spouse: Christina Buraea
- Children: 6
- Education: Uppsala University

Lars Stigzelius (27 October 1598 – 31 August 1676) was Archbishop of Uppsala in the Church of Sweden from 1670 to his death.

== Biography ==
He was the son of a priest and was a student at the Uppsala University until his Master of Arts in 1625. After undertaking a travel through Europe in 1630, he in 1640 became professor of theology in Uppsala. During his time as professor he was under pressure since both Johan Skytte, the chancellor of the university, and Laurentius Paulinus Gothus, the vice chancellor and a learnt professor who would later become archbishop, were supporters of the philosophy of Ramism (deriving from Petrus Ramus), while Stigzelius was an aristotelian.

This problem he had from 1630, when he became professor of logic, until, as said, 1640, when he became professor of theology. When in the 1660s Cartesian thoughts spread to the university, Stigzelius was working against it. He had a reputation at the University as being highly knowledgeable. His views usually counted. For instance he was working to remove exorcism as one of the Church dogmas (which still was in use in Sweden).
