= Johan Baazius the younger =

Swedish clergyman

The Most Reverend Johannes Baazius den yngre
- Archbishop of Uppsala; Primate of Sweden
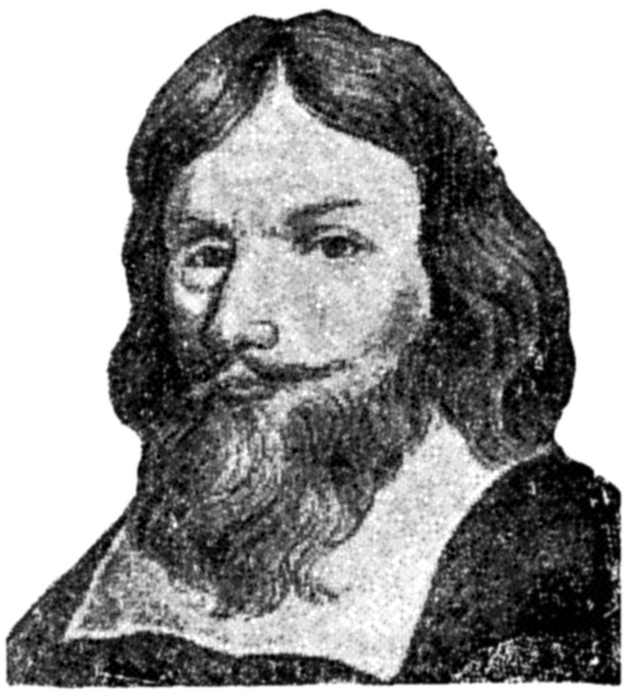
- Church: Church of Sweden
- Archdiocese: Uppsala
- Appointed: 1677
- In office: 1677–1681
- Predecessor: Lars Stigzelius
- Successor: Olov Svebilius
- Previous posts: Bishop of Växjö (1667–1673); Bishop of Skara (1673–1677)

Orders
- Consecration: 19 March 1668 by Lars Stigzelius
- Rank: Metropolitan Archbishop

Personal details
- Born: 13 July 1626 Jönköping, Sweden
- Died: 12 May 1681 (aged 54) Stockholm, Sweden
- Parents: Joannes Baazius the older
- Education: Uppsala University

Johan Baazius the younger (17 July 1626 – 12 May 1681) was a Swedish clergyman who served as Archbishop of Uppsala in the Church of Sweden.

== Biography ==
Johan Baazius was born in Jönköping. He was the son of Johan Baazius the elder (1581–1649), theologian and bishop of the Diocese of Växjö.

He was known as knowledgeable already at a young age. After further studies in Uppsala University, Königsberg University (Królewiec University) and other universities, mainly in Germany, he was appointed teacher for Nils Brahe, nephew of Per Brahe the Younger, Lord High Steward of Sweden. In 1653 he was also made court chaplain by Queen Christina. After this he held various offices, including as bishop of the Diocese of Växjö from 1667, bishop of Diocese of Skara 1673, and finally Archbishop of Uppsala in 1677.

Baazius died suddenly in his sleep after returning from a visit to Stockholm. He was succeeded as Archbishop of Uppsala by Olov Svebilius.

== Other sources ==
- Nordisk familjebok (1904), article Baazius
