= Samuel Enander =

Swedish priest

The Right Reverend Samuel Enander
- Bishop of Linköping
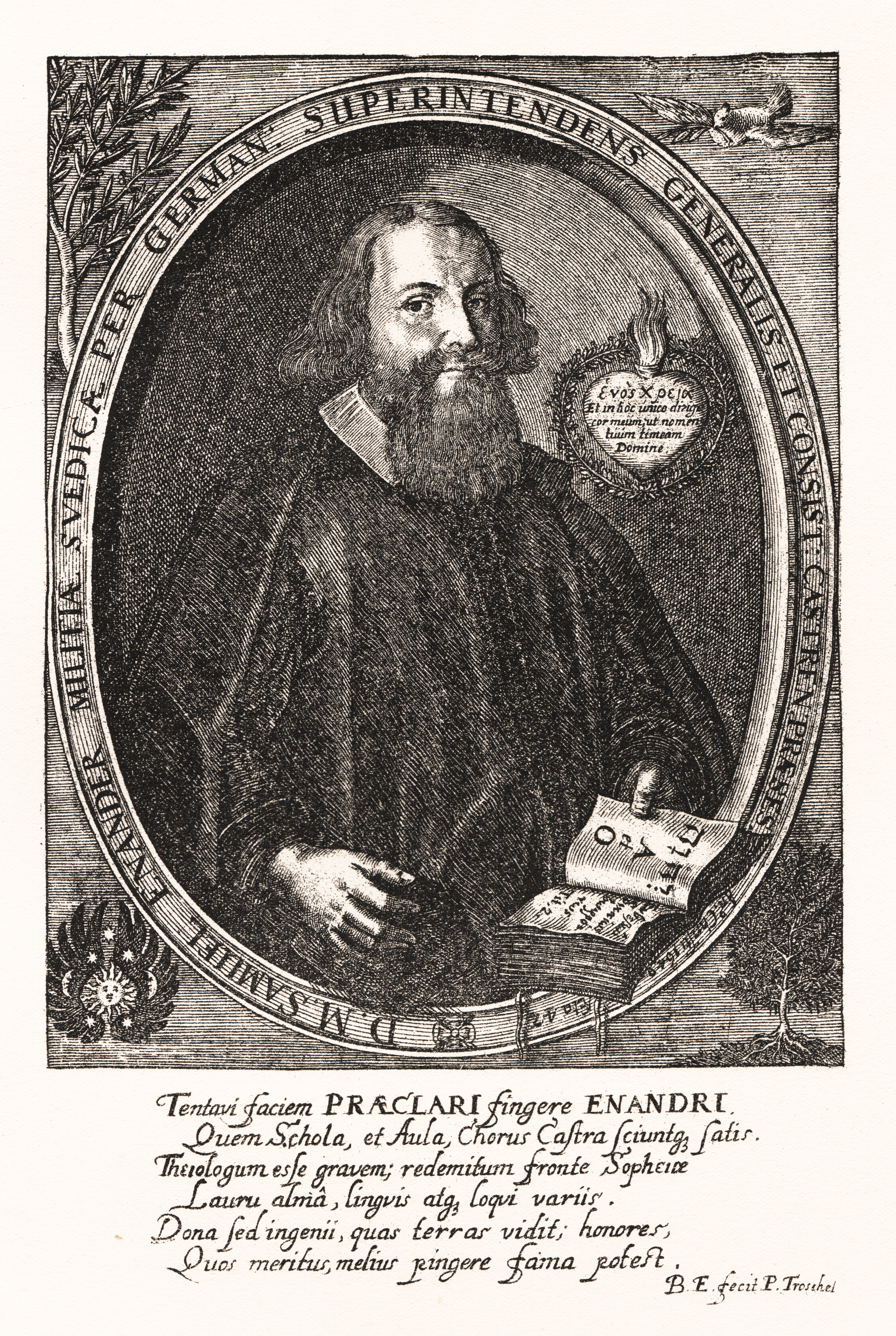
- Church: Church of Sweden
- Diocese: Linköping
- In office: 1655–1670
- Predecessor: Andreas Johannis Prytz
- Successor: Johannes Terserus

Orders
- Ordination: 21 December 1638 by Jonas Petri Gothus
- Consecration: 3 June 1655 by Johannes Canuti Lenaeus

Personal details
- Born: 20 September 1607 Västra Eneby, Sweden
- Died: 17 December 1670 (aged 63)
- Buried: Linköping Cathedral
- Denomination: Lutheran
- Parents: Nicolaus Petri Enander & Elin Helena Johansdotter
- Spouse: Margareta Jönsdotter Gothus; Brita Nilsdotter
- Children: 26

Samuel Enander (20 September 1607 – 17 December 1670), later knows as Samuel Nicolai Gyllenadler, was a Swedish prelate who served as the Bishop of Linköping 1655–1670.

== Early life ==
Enander was born in Västra Eneby, a parish 6 km away from Kisa, Sweden, the son of Nicolaus Petri, a priest, and Elin Jönsdotter Rosendal. Enander commenced studies at Uppsala University in October 1626 and graduated on 13 March 1632. Two years later, he was appointed associate professor in philosophy at the Grammar school in Linköping. Later, in 1637 he studied at Leiden University.

== Ordained ministry ==
In 1638 Enander was ordained priest and the following year he became vicar of the parish of Rystad. In 1641 he became a lecturer in philosophy and logic and theologian. In 1643 he was appointed vicar of Söderköping and in 1648 he became superintendent within the Swedish army. Later, in 1650, he became Superintendent in the Diocese of Kalmar.

== Bishop ==
In 1655 Enander was appointed Bishop of Linköping and was consecrated on 3 June 1655 by Archbishop Johannes Canuti Lenaeus. He retained his post till his death in 1670.

== Personal life ==
On 10 December 1637 he married Margareta Jönsdotter, daughter of Jonas Petri Gothus, Bishop of Linköping. He married for the second time in 1663 to Brita Nilsdotter, daughter of Nicolaus Eschilli, Superintendent of Kalmar. His daughter Elisabeth Gyllenadler (1639–1680) was married to Olov Svebilius (1624–1700) Archbishop of Uppsala.
