= Nils Rosén von Rosenstein =

Swedish physician (1706–1773)

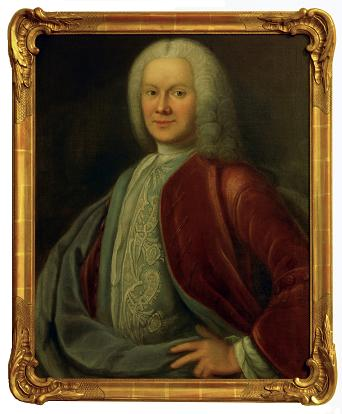
Portrait by Lorenz Pasch the Younger.

Nils Rosén von Rosenstein (11 February 1706 – 16 July 1773) was a Swedish physician. He is considered the founder of modern pediatrics, while his work The diseases of children, and their remedies is considered to be "the first modern textbook on the subject".

== Career ==
Nils Rosén was born in Sexdrega, Västra Götaland County in 1706. Son of the vicar Erich Rosenius and of Anna Wekander, he studied at the Gymnasium of Gothenburg and when he was 16 years old at Lund University under Kilian Stobaeus, and in Uppsala. In 1727, he was appointed as a lecturer at the Uppsala University, replacing Petrus Martin who had recently died. Rosén had already worked as an assistant to professor Olof Rudbeck at the time. But he couldn't take up this position until 1731, spending those four years traveling and studying abroad in Germany, Italy, France, and the Netherlands, where he studied for a while under Friedrich Hoffmann, Herman Boerhaave and Pieter van Musschenbroek. He stayed for a year in Geneva in Switzerland with Albrecht von Haller. In 1730, Rosén stayed in Harderwijk where he received his medical degree with his work De historiis morborum rite consignandis. He returned to Uppsala on 1 March 1731. He was at one point Carl Linnaeus's rival, who was one year younger than Rosén. While they were working at Uppsala University, they aimed for the same position as the other. This led to a strained relationship, with Rosén on the one hand teaching Linnaeus medicine, but on the other trying to take over the demonstrations Linnaeus gave at the botanical gardens. At one time, Rosén had Linnaeus expelled from the university for supposedly lecturing without the necessary qualifications, after which an enraged Linnaeus tried to stab him with a sword. Eventually, they would both hold one of the chairs of medicine and cooperate on more friendly terms. In 1740, Rosén succeeded Olof Rudbeck as professor of medicine at Uppsala University. Taking on the responsibility for the fields of physiology, anatomy, and practical medicine, while Rosén and Linnaeus were together responsible for pathology and chemistry. Originally, they held reverse positions (Rosén had botany, and Linnaeus anatomy and pathology), but considering their specialties and main interests, they switched places in 1742. As their mutual animosity died down they became colleagues, eventually becoming friends, with Rosén treating Linnaeus when he suffered from the so-called "Uppsala Fever" or pleurisy in 1764, and Linnaeus returning the favor two years later.

He was First Physician to the King of Sweden by 1743, retaining this title under Frederick of Sweden, Adolf Frederick of Sweden, and Gustav III of Sweden. He was made a Knight of the Polar Star and a member of the Royal Swedish Academy of Sciences, and ennobled in 1762, changing his name from Nils Rosén to Nils Rosén von Rosenstein.

== Family ==
Nils Rosén's younger brother Eberhard Rosén (1714–1796) was professor of medicine at the University of Lund, and changed his name to Rosenblad after being ennobled as well. Another brother, Sven Rosén (1708–1750), was a leading figure in Radical Pietism.

On 18 May 1734 Nils married the twelve years younger Anna Christina von Hermansson, daughter of Johan Hermansson, professor of political science and rector of the Uppsala University, and a niece of archbishop Johannes Steuchius. They had two children, Anna Margareta Rosén von Rosenstein (born 16 February 1736) and Nils von Rosenstein (born 12 December 1752). Anna Margareta married Samuel Aurivillius and was the mother of Carl von Rosenstein, archbishop of Uppsala and rear admiral Måns von Rosenstein. The younger Nils was later appointed tutor of the future king Gustav IV Adolf of Sweden, and afterwards became Secretary of State, the first secretary of the Swedish Academy from 1786 until his death in 1824, and Commander in the Order of the Polar Star. He was a philosopher, and author of Forsok till en afhandling om upplysningen (Essay concerning the Enlightenment).

== Works ==
- Archiater og Ridder Hr. Rosen von Rosensteins paa Hendes Kongl. Svenske Majestets naadigste befaling forfattede Huus- og Reese-Apotheque : trykt i Stockholm hos Carl Gotlieb Ulf 1765. [S.l.]; Kjøbenhavn : Svare, 1768. Digital edition by the University and State Library Düsseldorf

== Bibliography ==
- Compendium Anatonicum, the first textbook on anatomy in Swedish.
- Underrättelser om barn-sjukdomar och deras botemedel, Stockholm, 1764. Third edition 1771. Translated in English in 1776 as The Diseases of Children and their Remedies by Anders Erikson Sparrman. Also translated in Dutch (1768, second edition 1769), Danish (1769) French (1778), Italian (1780), German (1785, 6th edition by 1798) and Japanese.
- Hus- och reseapotheque. (1765) Translated in Dutch.

== Nils Rosén von Rosenstein Medal ==
The Swedish Pediatric Society and the Swedish Society of Medicine jointly award the Nils Rosén von Rosenstein Medal to three physicians every five years. It is considered one of the most prestigious awards in pediatrics in the world. Among those awarded the medal are C. Henry Kempe, Fehmida Jalil, Abraham Rudolph, Yngve Hofvander, Derrick Jelliffe, Demissie Habte, Lars Hanson, Seymour Donald Mayneord Court, Alexandre Minkowski, Edwin A. Mitchell, Arvo Ylppö, Ronnie Mac Keith and Kanwaljeet S. Anand. Link to the award: https://www.kbh.uu.se/rosen-von-rosenstein-award

In 2007, the Rosénparken (Rosén Park), named in his honour, was opened in Uppsala.
