= Linköping Cathedral =

- Linköpings domkyrka
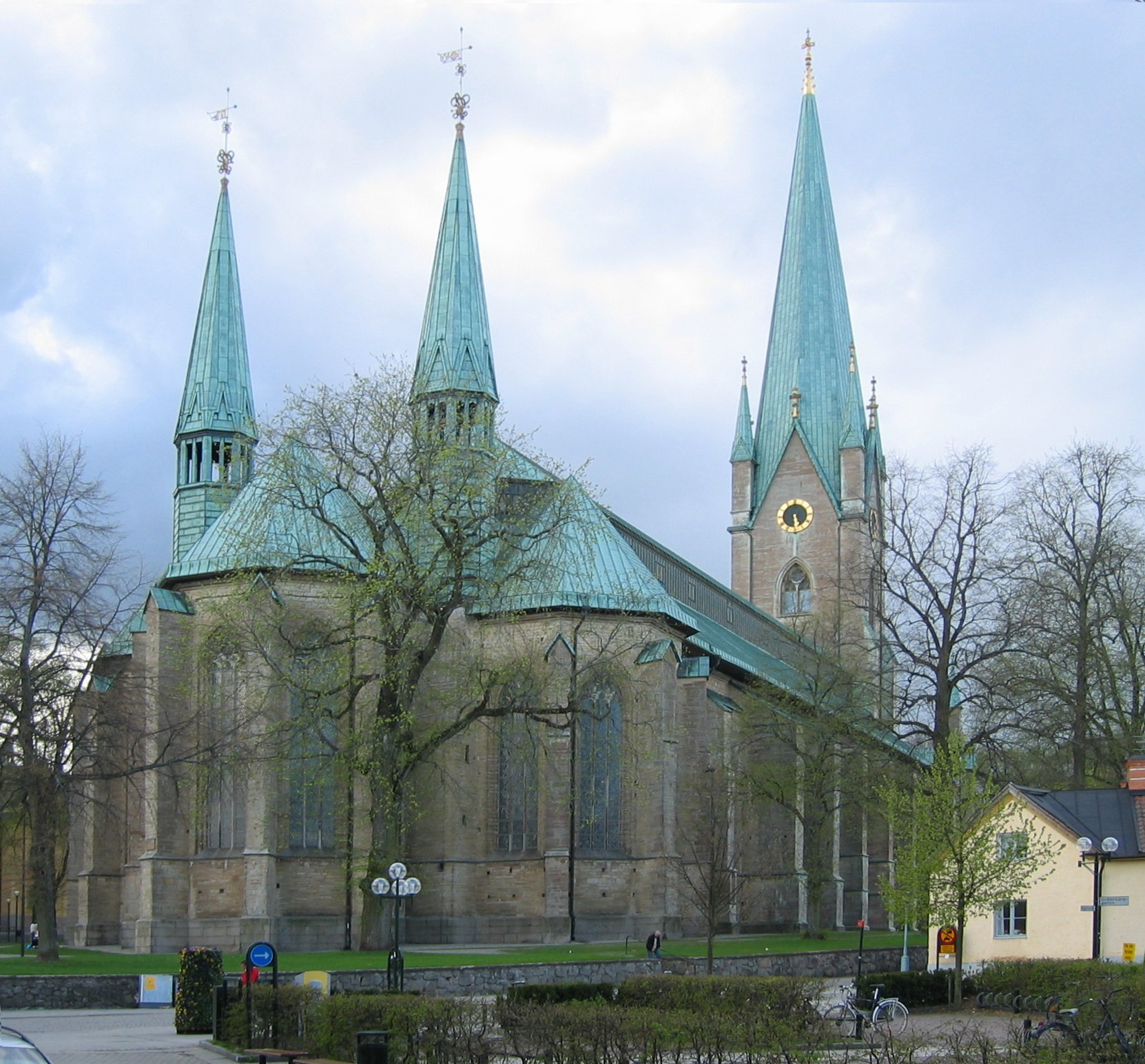
- Linköping Cathedral from the east
- Linköping Cathedral
- 58°24′40″N 15°37′02″E
- Location: Linköping
- Country: Sweden
- Denomination: Church of Sweden
- Previous denomination: Roman Catholic

History
- Status: Cathedral & Parish church
- Founded: 13th century
- Dedication: Saint Peter
- Consecrated: 1100s

Architecture
- Functional status: Active
- Architectural type: Gothic

Administration
- Diocese: Linköping

Clergy
- Bishop: Martin Modéus

Linköping Cathedral (Swedish: Linköpings domkyrka) is an active Lutheran church in the Swedish city of Linköping, the episcopal seat of the Diocese of Linköping in the Church of Sweden. One of the largest Gothic cathedrals in Scandinavia, it is situated opposite Linköping Castle, on a site that has been in use as a church since the 11th century.

== History ==
=== Origins ===
The present building is about 800 years old. The church's recorded history on this site begins in the 11th century, with the construction of a wooden church. Later, around 1120, a stone church was built, a basilica of about half the size of the present building. By around 1230 it became necessary to construct a larger church, as the basilica was no longer large enough to serve the developing needs of the community. The church was extended to the east, with the construction of a new choir and transept. These 13th-century parts remain as part of the present church. The current altarpiece is dated to the same period.

The next extension of the church was made following the coronation of King Valdemar, in 1251. The main building was now constructed, and the church received its current length of 110 meters. The height of the tower is 107 metres (351 ft). At the beginning of the 15th century, between 1408 and 1420, the Gothic chapels were constructed, with large windows and star-shaped vaults. The chapels were named after Saint Andrew (later renamed after Saint Mary), Saint Nicolaus Hermanni (Nils Hermansson) and Saint Thomas Becket. The church in this period, having benefited since the early 14th century from the import of English and of German craftsmen, who undertook the rich programme of sculptural decoration that distinguishes the west end, has been characterised as "the only important centre for Gothic sculpture in the late 15th century". The roof of the church was damaged by fire in 1546 and again in 1567. The tower was rebuilt between 1747 and 1758, and again, between 1877 and 1886, by Helgo Zettervall. In 1967 the shape of the 17th-century roof was restored. It is covered with copper sheeting, the corrosion of which has produced its distinctive green colour.

== Interior ==
=== Early history ===
In 1320, a programme of interior decoration was undertaken, with the arcades of the nave embellished with carving and sculptural decorations; these bear stylistic hallmarks typical of the development of the English High Gothic; the carved roof bosses of the nave vaults, completed about the same time, and thought to be by the same sculptor, feature the green man common to the folklore of the British Isles. The presence of English coins contemporary with that period on the site indicate the involvement of English artists at work in the region. Further embellishment of the church took place in 1330, when the tympanum of the south portal was decorated with relief scenes from the Nativity and the Passion, in a German style.

==== The present day ====
The cathedral has a significant 16th century altarpiece by Dutch Golden Age painter Maarten van Heemskerck, Crucifixion, a polyptych painted for Sint-Laurenskerk, Alkmaar. Begun in 1538 and completed in 1542, the artwork was first installed in the church in Alkmaar; the onset of the Reformation led to its removal and in 1581 it was sold. In 2006, British artist Brian Clarke was commissioned to design six stained glass windows for the north and south porches of the cathedral's transept: three lancets above the porch entrances on each side. Funded by the Bernhard Risberg Donation Fund, created in 1947 "for the beautification of Linköping Cathedral", the windows were installed in September 2010.

=== In popular culture ===
The cathedral is featured on the cover of the album Opus Eponymous by Ghost, whose founder, Tobias Forge, is a native of Linköping.

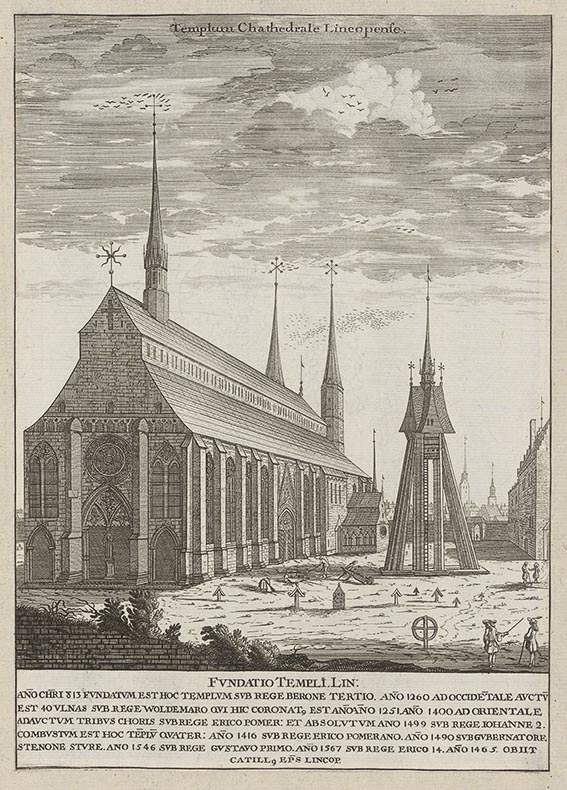
Linköping Cathedral from Suecia Antiqua et Hodierna from around 1690–1710.

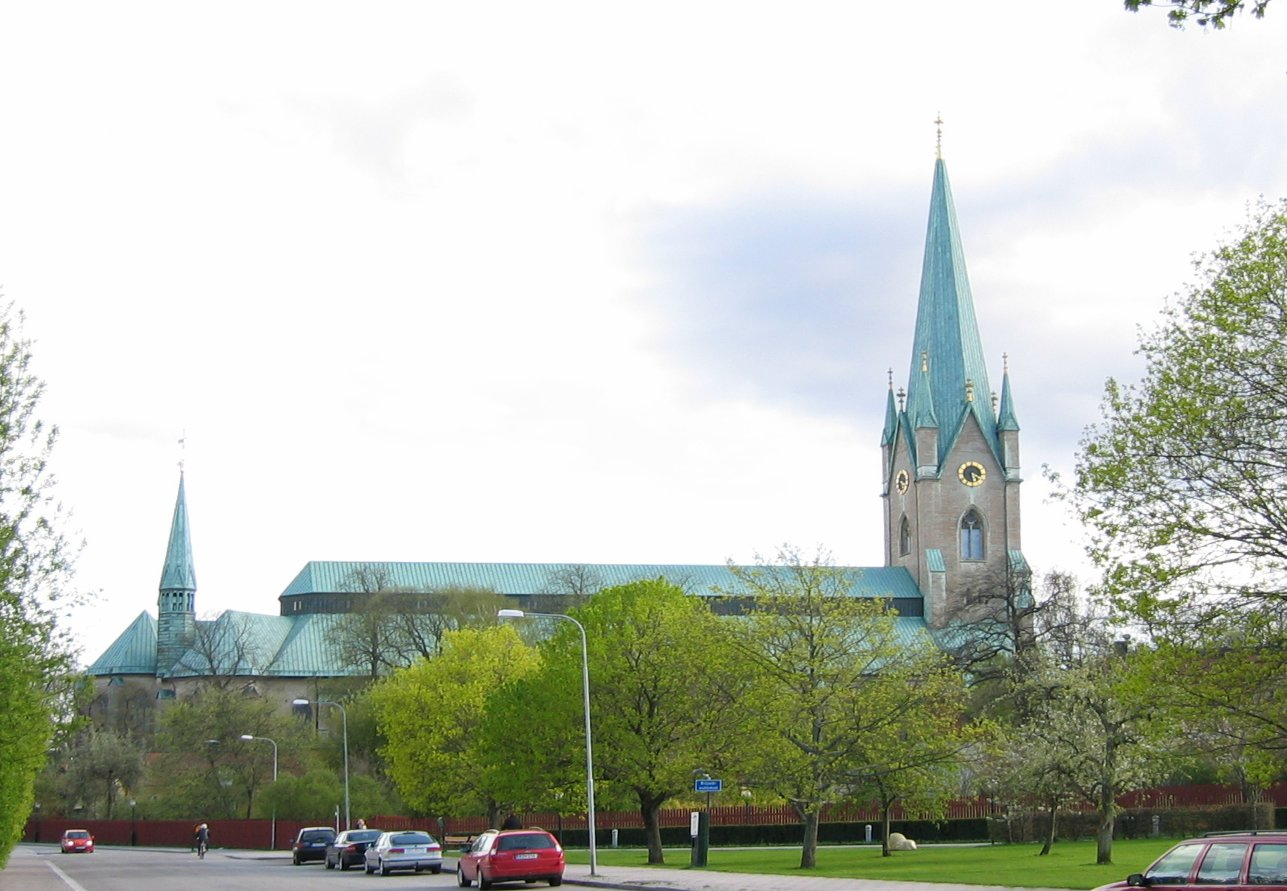
From the north

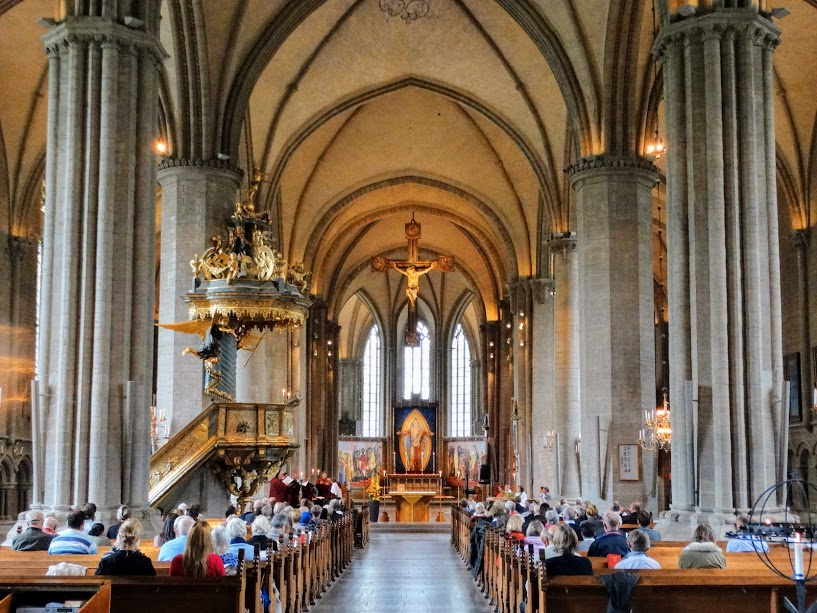
The interior with the pulpit and altar

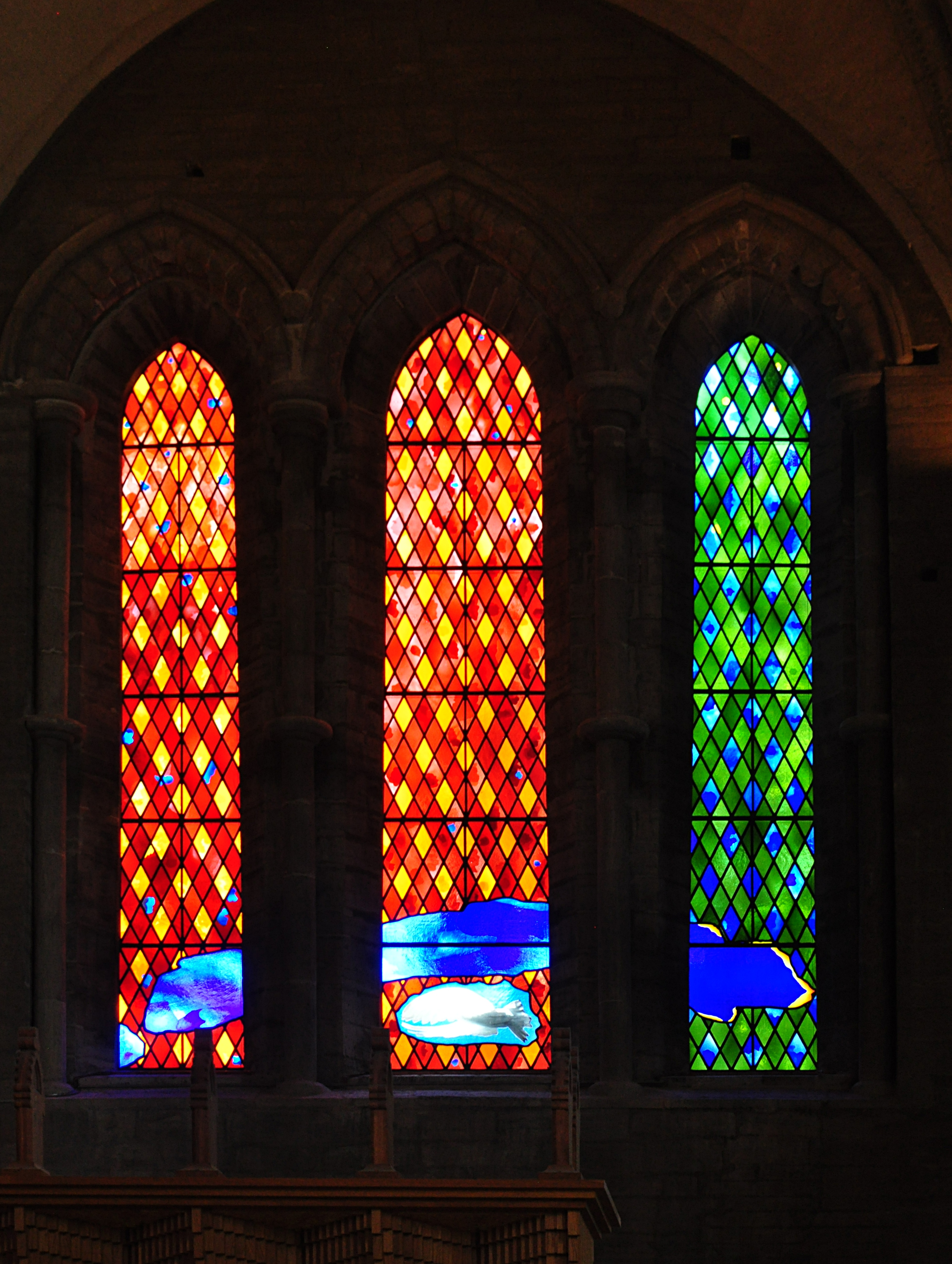
Modern stained glass windows of the cathedral's north porch (Andens fönster) designed by artist Brian Clarke

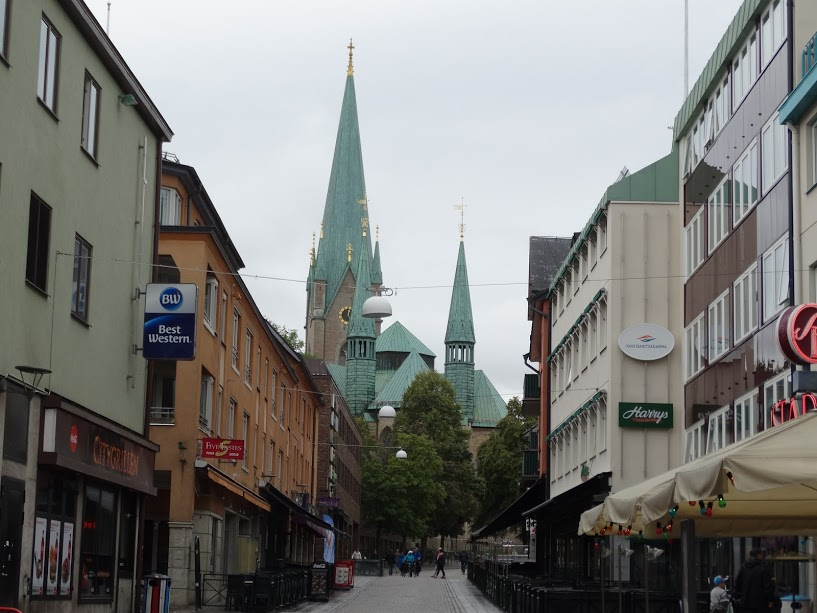
The cathedral from outside

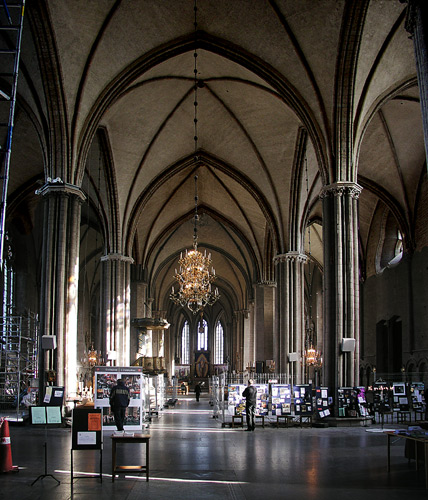
Interior from the west, 2003

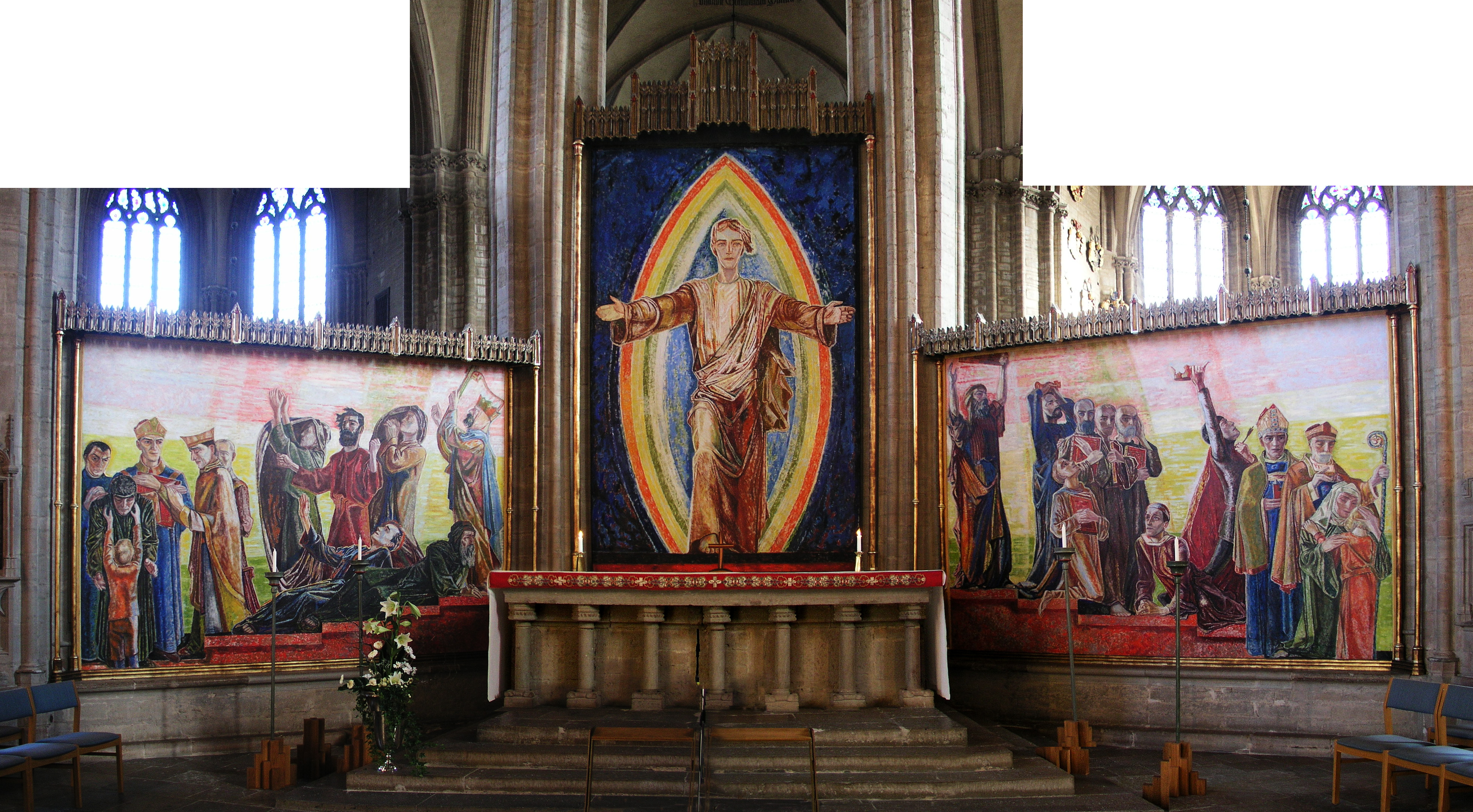
Altarpiece.

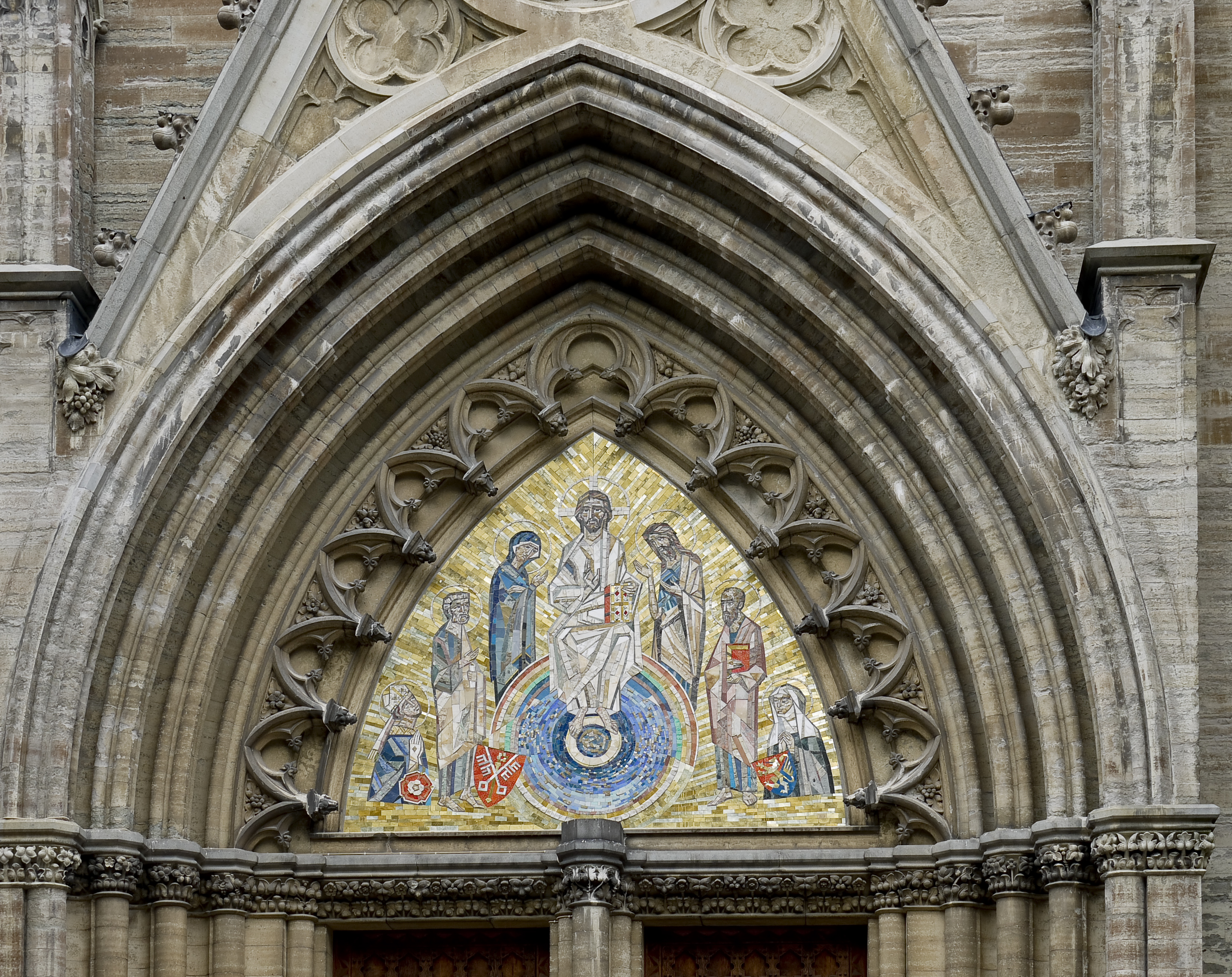
The mosaic above the portal

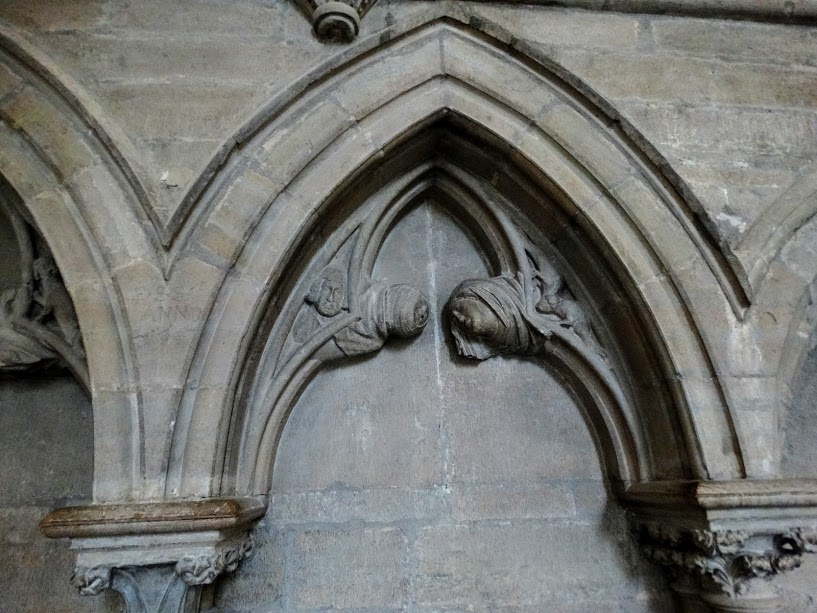
Architectural detail

== Burials ==
- Erik Sparre (later exhumed and remanded to the church in Öja parish, Södermanland)
- John, Duke of Östergötland
- Jon Jarl (disputed)
- Bishop Kettil Karlsson Vasa, Regent of Sweden 1464–1465
- Princess Maria Elizabeth of Sweden
- Bishop Nicolaus Hermanni
- Bishop Samuel Enander Gyllenadler
- Count Ture Nilsson Bielke and his wife Margareta Svantesdotter Sture, by Willem van den Blocke
