= Bishop of Linköping =

This is a list of Bishops of the Diocese of Linköping, Sweden.

== Before the Reformation ==
- Herbert?
- Rikard?
- 1139–1160s Gisle
- 1170–1171 Stenar
- 1187–1195/96 Kol
- John
- 1216–1220 Karl Magnusson
- 1220–1236 Bengt Magnusson
- 1236–1258 Lars I
- 1258–1283 Henrik
- 1258–1286 Bo
- 1286–1291 Bengt Birgersson
- 1292–1307 Lars II
- 1307–1338 Karl Bååt
- 1342–1351 Petrus Torkilsson
- 1352–1372 Nils Markusson
- 1373–1374 Gottskalk Falkdal
- 1375–1391 Nils Hermansson
- 1391–1436 Knut Bosson
- 1436–1440 ?
- 1441–1458 Nils König
- 1459–1465 Kettil Karlsson (Vasa)
- 1465–1500 Henrik Tidemansson
- 1501–1512 Hemming Gadh
  - 1501–1513 Jaume Serra i Cau, apostolic administrator
- 1513–1527 Hans Brask

== After the reformation ==
- 1529–1540 Johannes Magni
- 1543–1558 Nicolaus Canuti
- 1558–1569 Erik Falck
- 1569–1580 Martinus Olai Gestricus
- 1583–1587 Petrus Caroli
- 1589–1606 Petrus Benedicti
- 1606–1630 Jonas Kylander
- 1631–1635 Johannes Botvidi
- 1637–1644 Jonas Petri Gothus
- 1645–1655 Andreas Johannis Prytz
- 1655–1670 Samuel Enander
- 1671–1678 Johannes Terserus
- 1678–1681 Olov Svebilius
- 1681–1691 Magnus Pontin
- 1693–1711 Haquin Spegel
- 1711–1716 Jacob Lang
- 1716–1729 Torsten Rudeen
- 1730 Johannes Steuchius
- 1731–1742 Erik Benzelius the younger
- 1743–1761 Andreas Olavi Ryzelius
- 1761–1780 Petrus Filenius
- 1780–1786 Uno von Troil
- 1786–1805 Jakob Axelsson Lindblom
- 1805–1808 Magnus Lehnberg
- 1809–1819 Carl von Rosenstein
- 1819–1833 Marcus Wallenberg
- 1833–1861 Johan Jacob Hedrén
- 1861–1884 Ebbe Gustaf Bring
- 1884–1893 Carl Alfred Cornelius
- 1893–1906 Carl Wilhelm Charlewille
- 1907–1910 Otto Ahnfelt
- 1910–1926 John Personne
- 1927–1935 Erik Aurelius
- 1936–1947 Tor Andrae
- 1947–1959 Torsten Ysander
- 1959–1980 Ragnar Askmark
- 1980–1995 Martin Lönnebo
- 1995–2011 Martin Lind
- 2011–2022 Martin Modéus
- 2023– Marika Markovits
