= Olov Svebilius =

Swedish priest

The Most Reverend Olov Svebilius DTh
- Archbishop of Uppsala; Primate of Sweden
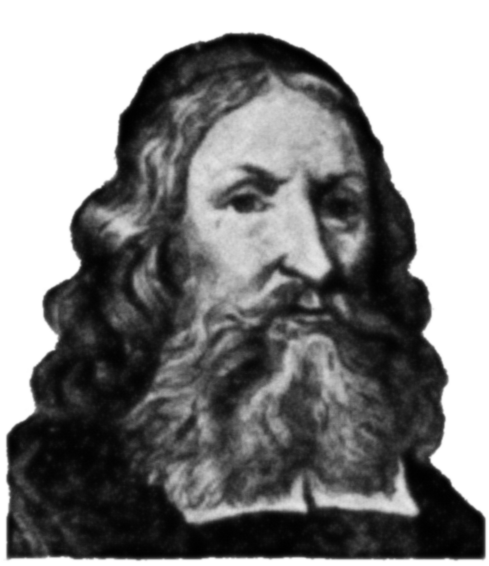
- Church: Church of Sweden
- Archdiocese: Uppsala
- Appointed: 1681
- In office: 1681–1700
- Predecessor: Johan Baazius the younger
- Successor: Erik Benzelius the elder
- Previous post: Bishop of Linköping (1678–1681)

Orders
- Ordination: 1658
- Consecration: 8 December 1678 by Johan Baazius the younger
- Rank: Metropolitan Archbishop

Personal details
- Born: 1 January 1624 Ljungby, Sweden
- Died: 29 June 1700 (aged 76) Uppsala, Sweden
- Denomination: Lutheran
- Parents: Jöran Eriksson (1589–1669); Ingeborg Larsdotter (1596–1672)
- Spouse: Elisabeth Gyllenadler (1639–1680)
- Education: Uppsala University

Olaus (Olov) Svebilius (1 January 1624 – 29 June 1700) was a Swedish priest and professor. He was Bishop of the Diocese of Linköping and Archbishop of Uppsala. His most notable work was Martin Luthers Lilla katekes med Katekesförklaring, a Swedish language translation and explanation of Luther's Small Catechism.

== Biography ==
He was born in Ljungby parish in Kalmar, Sweden. He was the son of Jöran Ericsson Swebilius (1589–1669) and Ingeborg Larsdotter (1596–1672). His father served as crown commander (Kronobefallningsman) at Södra Möre, now part of Kalmar municipality. The surname Svebilius was derived from his grandfather's farm Sveby in Sillerud parish (Sveby gård i Sillerud) in Värmland.

He studied at University of Uppsala in 1638, two years later he enrolled in Königsberg University, and thereafter moved back to Uppsala earning his Master of Philosophy in 1649. He subsequently conducted study trips to Strasbourg and Paris where he studied law. Appointed associate professor in Kalmar in 1652, he became rector and associate professor of philosophy in 1656, ordained priest in 1658, became associate professor of theology that same year and vicar of Ljungby in Kalmar diocese in 1663. He subsequently transferred to a theology professorship at Lund University.

He was appointed court chaplain in 1668, in 1670 was entrusted with the teachings theology to future King Charles XI of Sweden (1655–1697) and in 1671 became Pastor primarius at Storkyrkan church in Stockholm. After his coronation in 1675, King Charles declared it obligatory for all commoners to learn to read Luther's Small Catechism as translated by Olov Svebilius. In 1678, Svebilius became Bishop of the Diocese of Linköping and in 1681 Archbishop of Uppsala. He was the Speaker of the Clergy in the Riksdag between 1682 and 1697.

== Personal life ==
In 1658, he married Elisabeth Gyllenadler (1639–1680), daughter of Samuel Enander (1607–1670) who was Bishop of the Diocese of Linköping (1655–1670).

His children were ennobled Adlerberg and introduced at the House of Nobility. A branch of the family were elevated to counts by the Czar of Russia and thus part of the Russian nobility.

== See also ==
- List of Archbishops of Uppsala
