= Carl von Rosenstein =

Archbishop of Uppsala

The Most Reverend Carl von Rosenstein
- Archbishop of Uppsala; Primate of Sweden
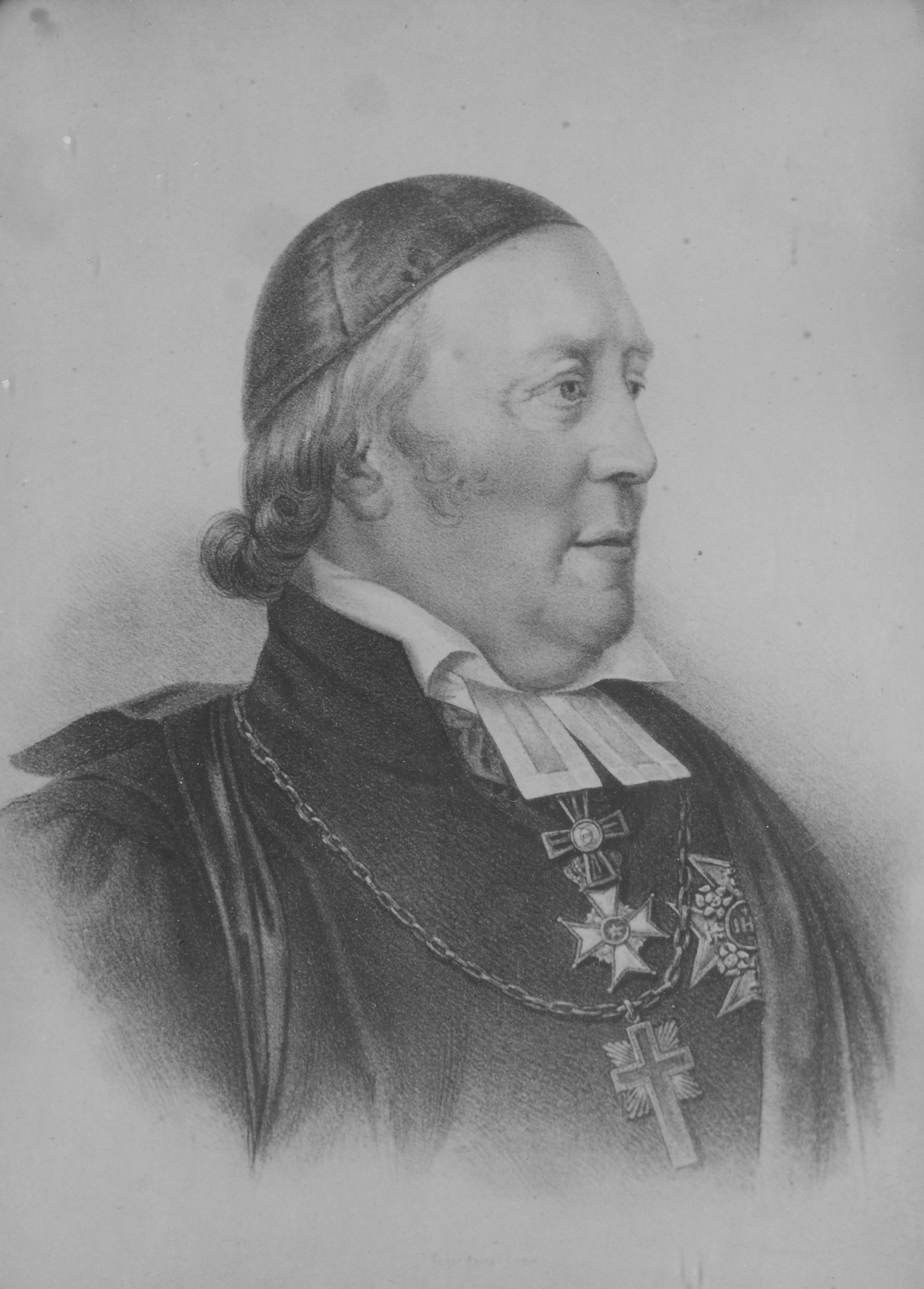
- Church: Church of Sweden
- Archdiocese: Uppsala
- Appointed: 1819
- In office: 1819–1836
- Predecessor: Jakob Axelsson Lindblom
- Successor: Johan Olof Wallin

Orders
- Ordination: 1791
- Consecration: 9 April 1809 by Jakob Axelsson Lindblom
- Rank: Metropolitan Archbishop

Personal details
- Born: 13 May 1776 Uppsala, Sweden
- Died: 2 December 1836 (aged 60) Uppsala, Sweden
- Parents: Samuel Aurivillius; Anna Margaretha Rosén von Rosenstein
- Spouse: Henriette Elisabeth Cederström (1793–1836)
- Education: University of Uppsala

Carl von Rosenstein (born Carl Aurivillius; 13 May 1766 – 2 December 1836) was the Church of Sweden Bishop of Linköping from 1809 to 1819 and Archbishop of Uppsala from 1819 to 1836.

== Biography ==
Rosenstein was born in Uppsala, Sweden. He was the son of professor Samuel Aurivillius and Anna Margaretha Rosén von Rosenstein. He belonged to the Swedish nobility. The "von Rosenstein" surname was his mother's family name which came through an adoption. His maternal grandfather was Uppsala University professor of medicine Nils Rosén von Rosenstein (1706–1773).

He attended Uppsala University where he first studied classical literature followed by theology. In 1786, at the age of 20, Rosenstein defended his PhD. He was ordained a priest in 1791 after becoming master of primus and associate professor of theology in 1790. In 1792 he became theology liceniat. He served as a theology lecturer at the University of Uppsala, leaving in 1796 to become pastor in the pastorate of Kumla and Hallsberg. In 1809, he was appointed Bishop of the Diocese of Linköping and in 1819 Archbishop of Uppsala. He was also a member of the Royal Swedish Academy of Sciences from 1809 and of the Swedish Academy from 1819.

Religious titles
Preceded by Magnus Lehnberg	Bishop of Linköping; 1809–1819	Succeeded by Marcus Wallenberg
Preceded by Jacob Axelsson Lindblom	Archbishop of Uppsala; 1819–1836	Succeeded by Johan Olof Wallin
Cultural offices
Preceded by Jacob Axelsson Lindblom	Swedish Academy, Seat No 5; 1819-1836	Succeeded by Jöns Jakob Berzelius
