= Sätra brunn =

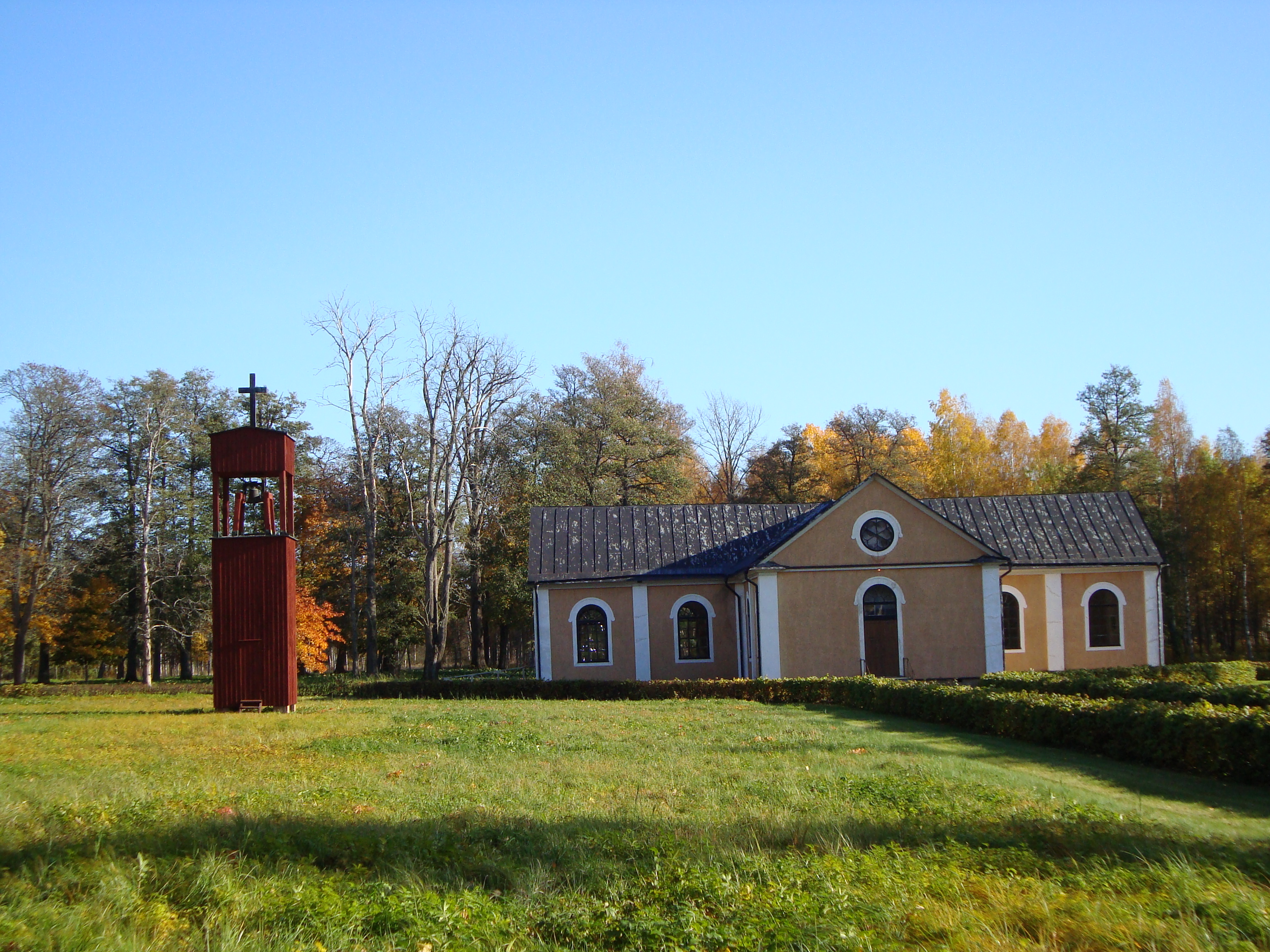
- Sätra Brunn Church in October 2008

- Location within Västmanland Location within Sweden
- Coordinates: 59°52′N 16°26′E
- Country: Sweden
- Province: Västmanland
- County: Västmanland County
- Municipality: Sala Municipality

Area
  - Total: 0.69 km^{2} (0.27 sq mi)

Population (31 December 2010)
  - Total: 335
  - Density: 483/km^{2} (1,250/sq mi)
- Time zone: UTC+1 (CET)
  - Summer (DST): UTC+2 (CEST)

Sätra brunn is a spa town in Sala Municipality, Västmanland County, Sweden. As of 2010, it had 335 inhabitants. It is most famous for its spa, one of Sweden's oldest health resorts.

== Spa ==
The Sätra brunn spa house was established in 1700 and is located about 1.4 km from the town. Since 2002, it has been owned by the Sätra Brunn Economic Association.

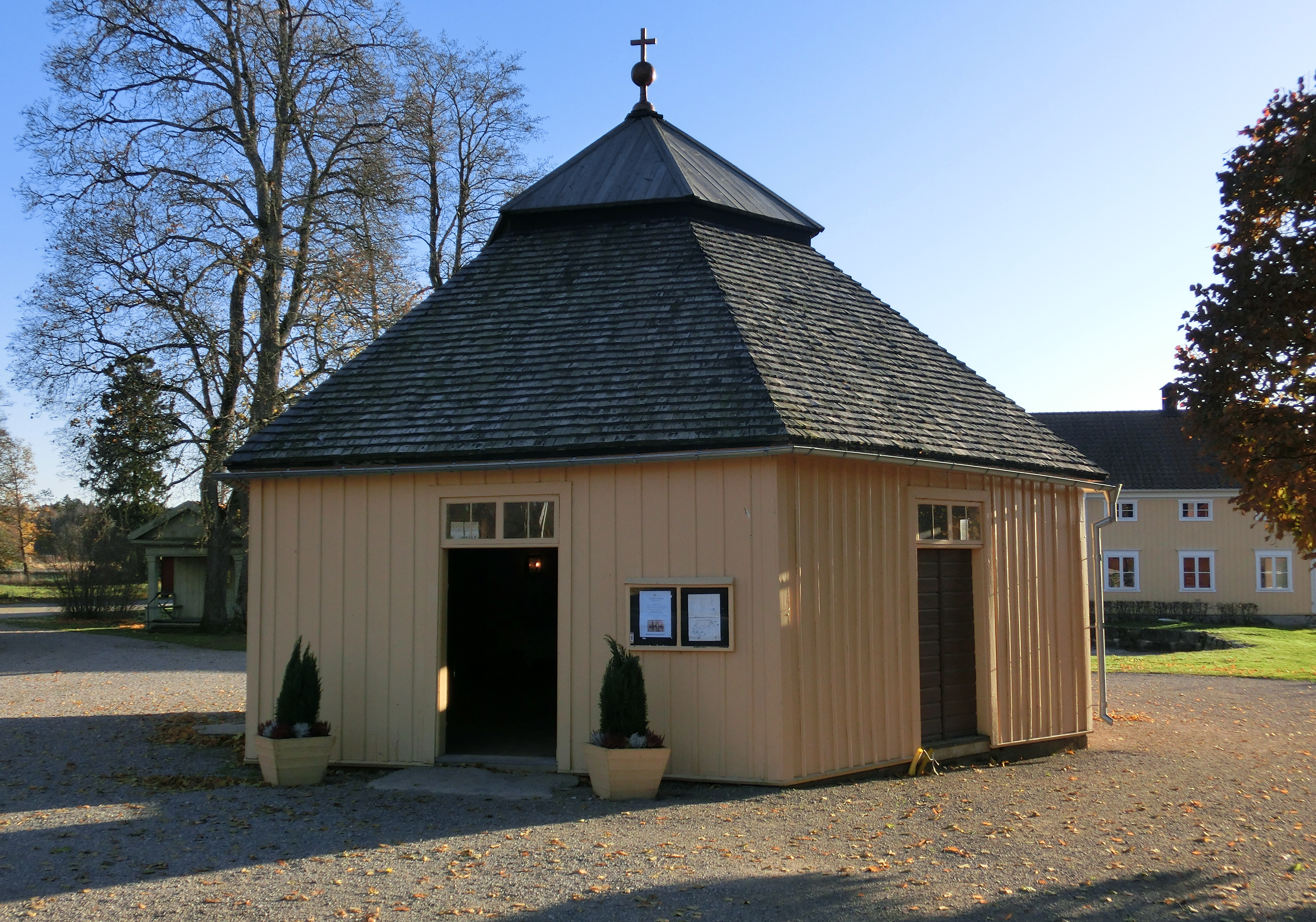
The spring house

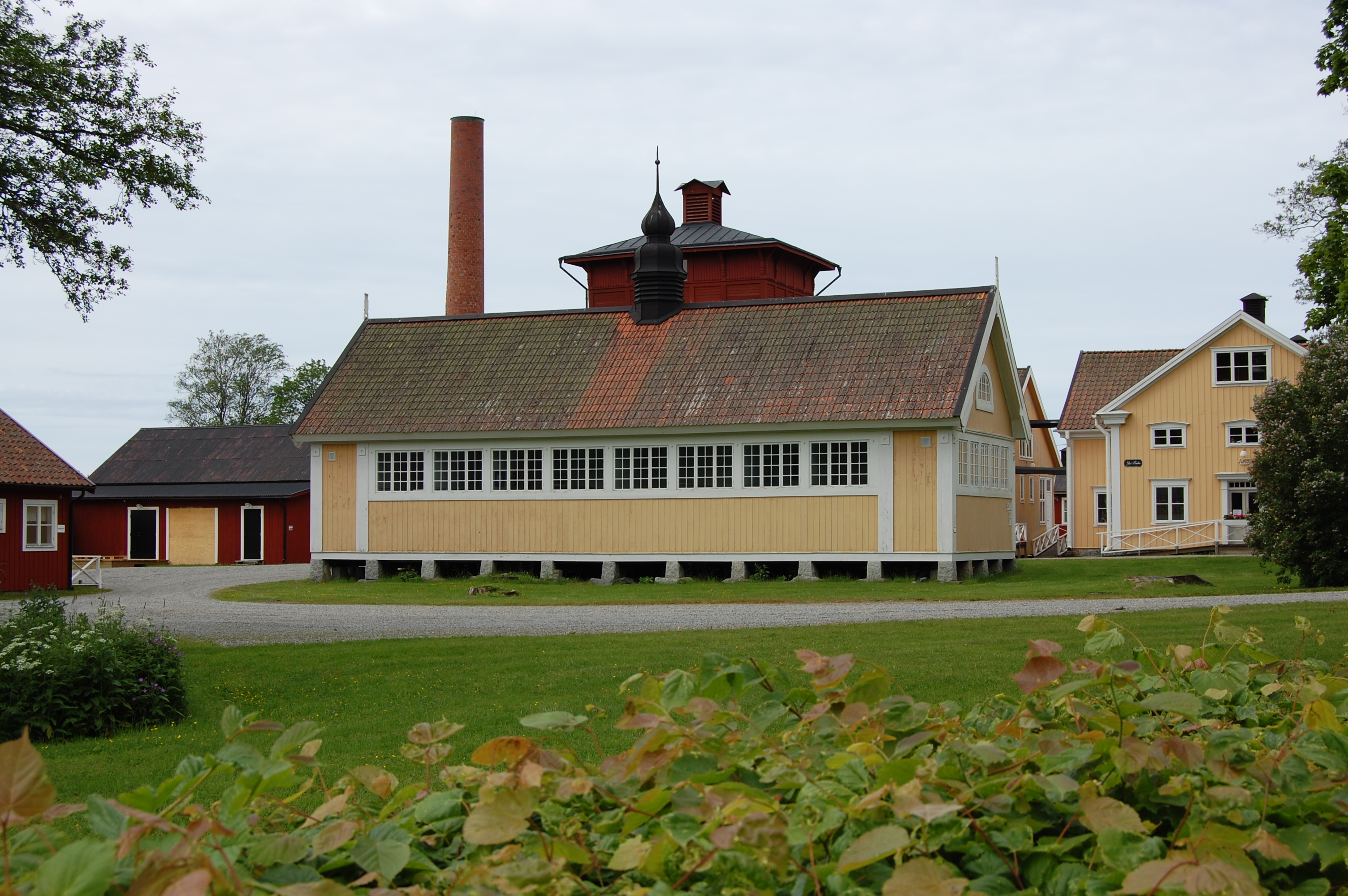
The bath institution

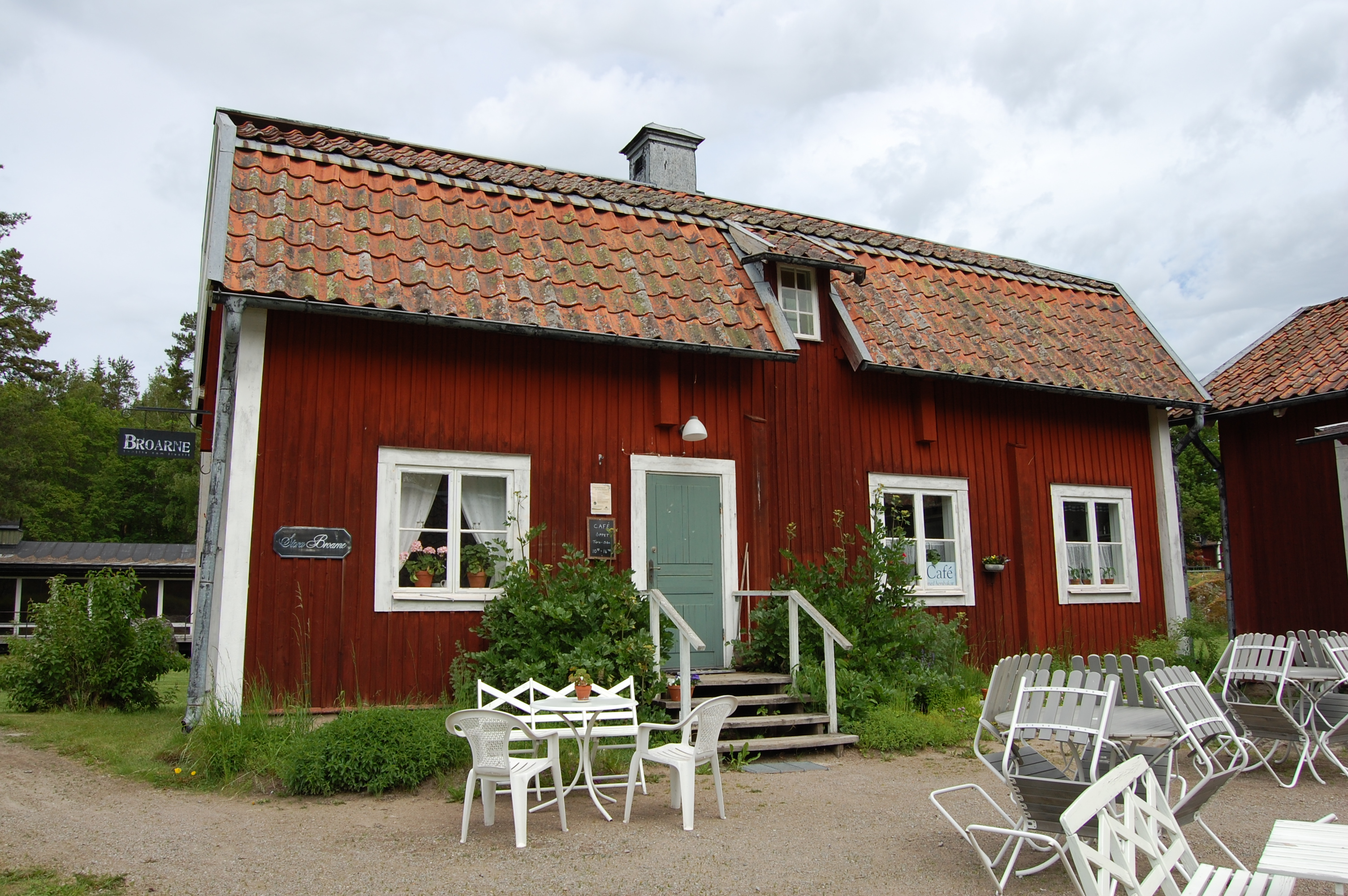
Great Broarne

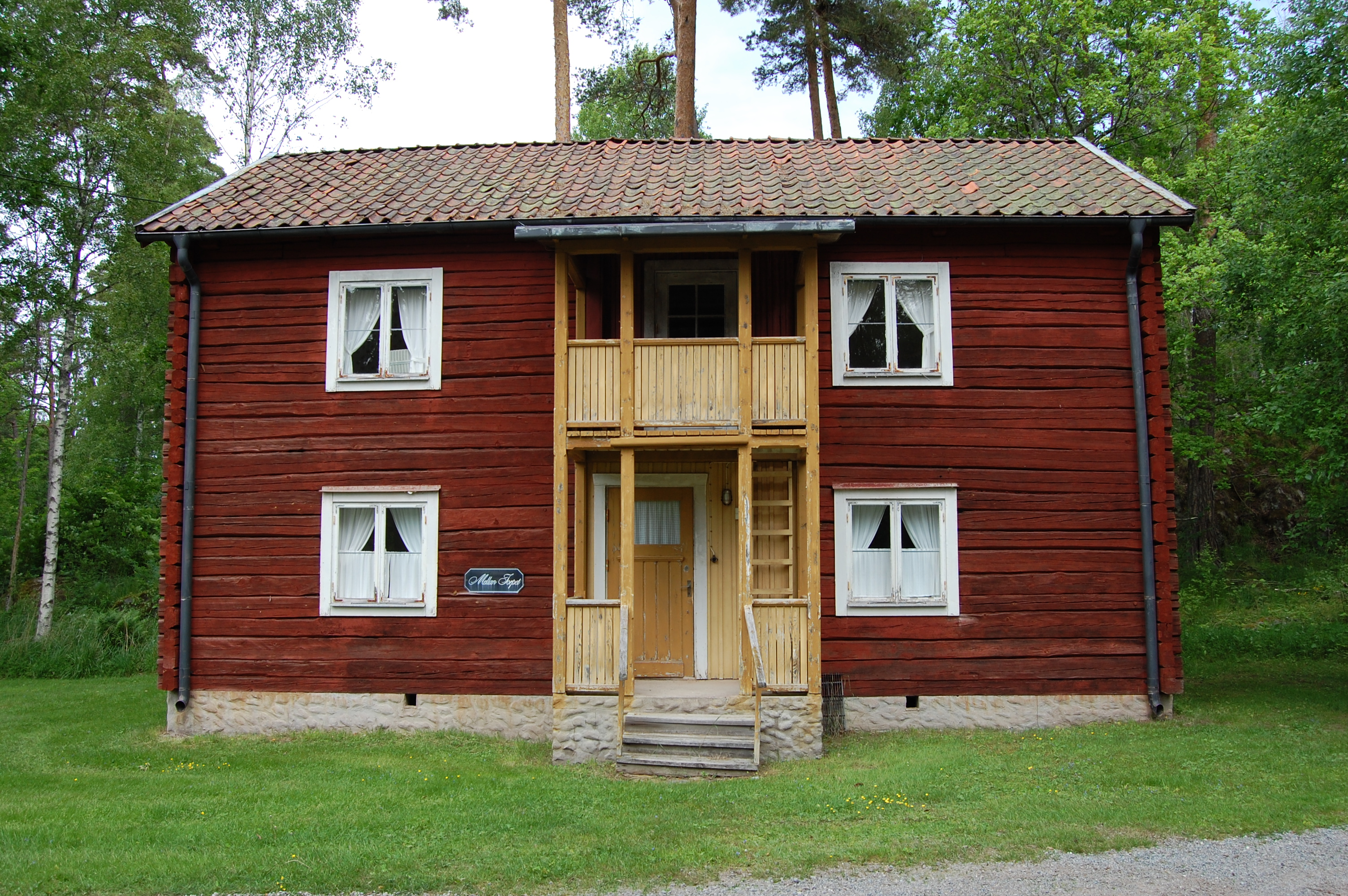
The Middle Croft

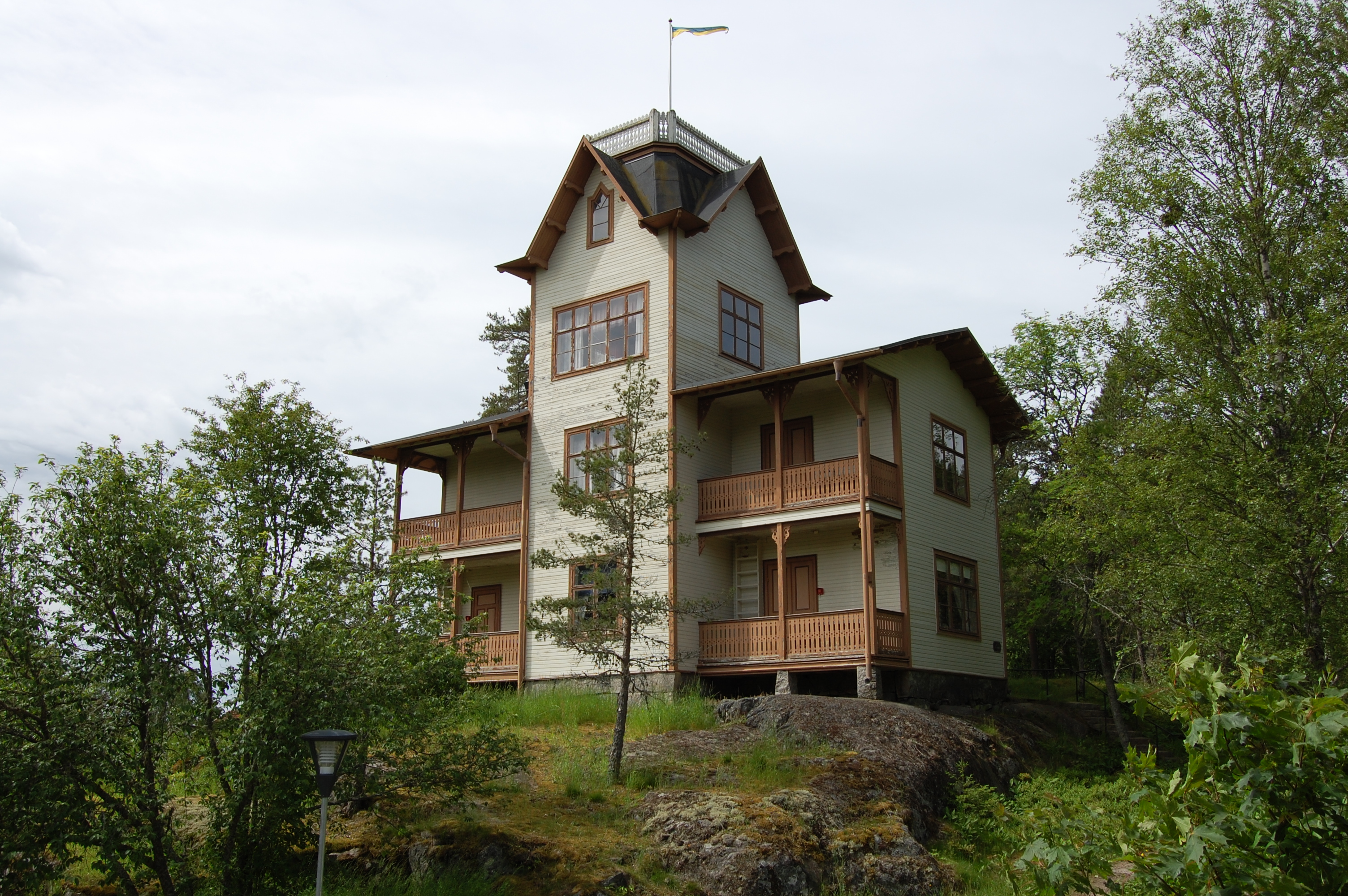
Bergabo

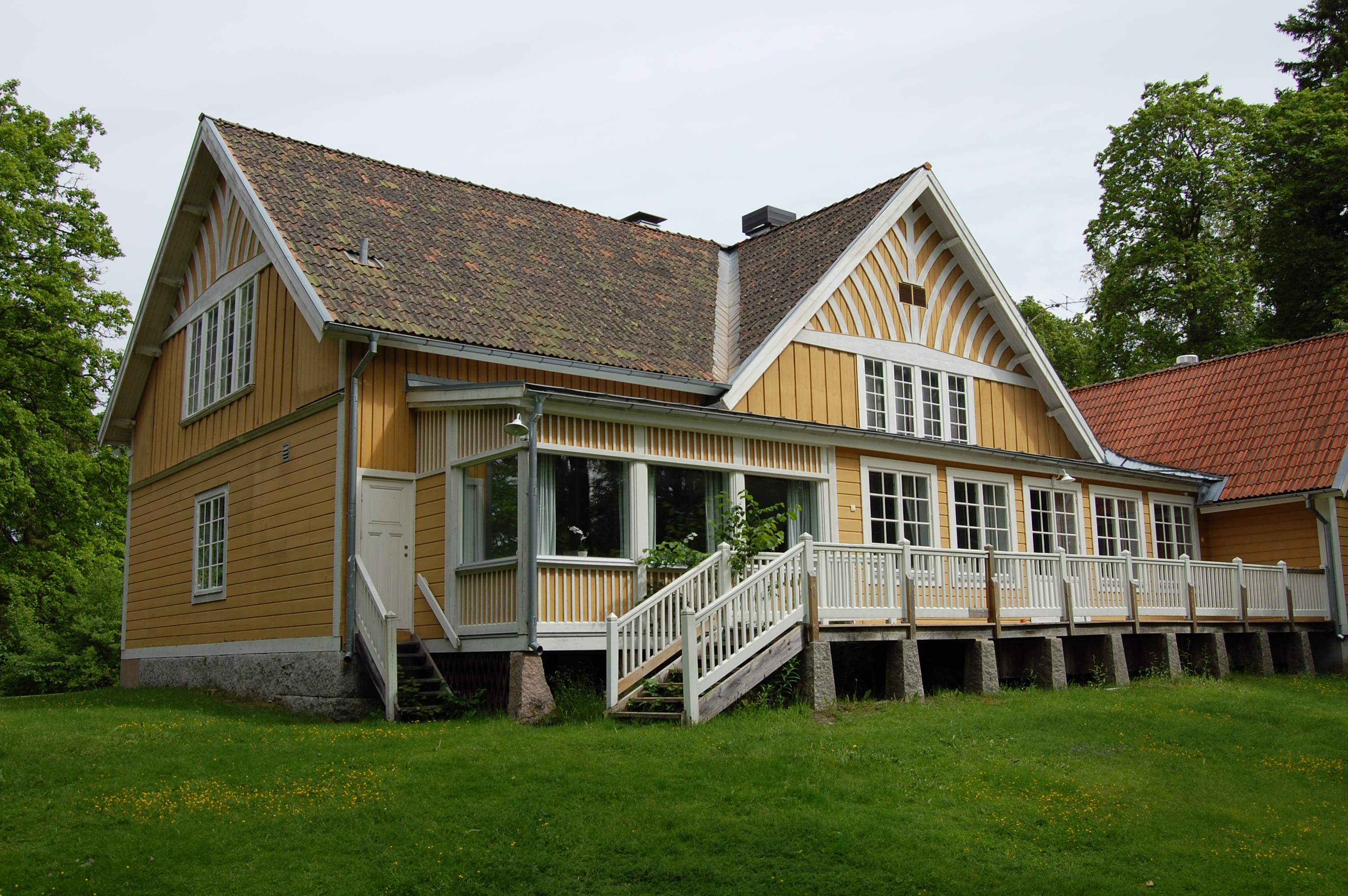
The socialite house

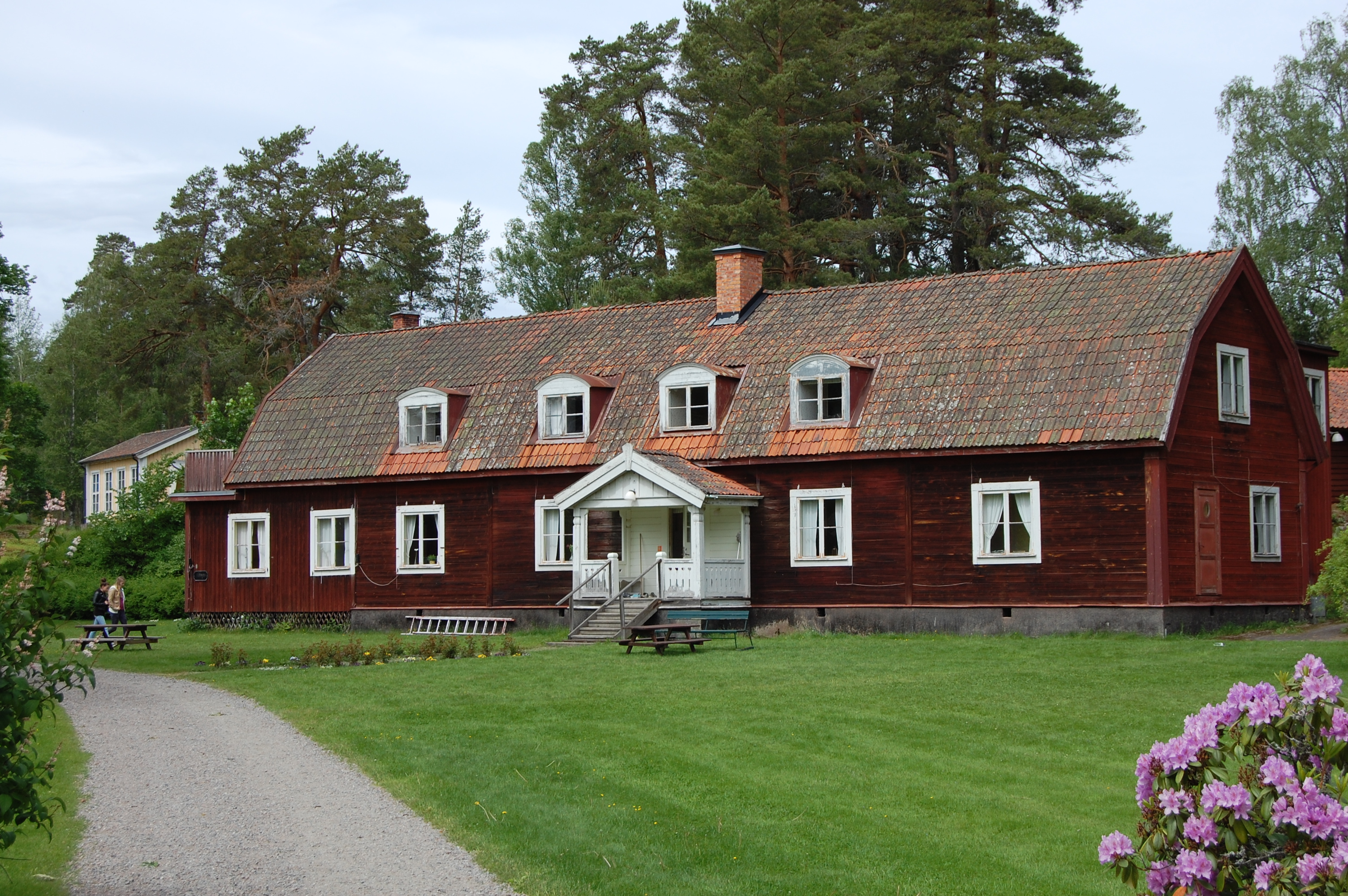
The medical cottage
