= Rostock Matrikelportal =

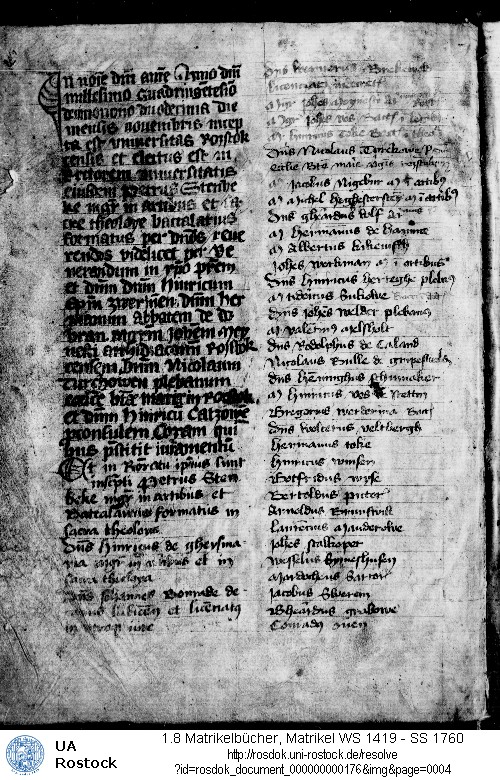
The Rostock Matrikelportal

The Rostock Matrikelportal (matriculation portal) disseminates about 186,000 individual-level datasets drawn from the student registers of the University of Rostock from its establishment in 1419 to today. Each entry is faithfully transcribed and linked with a digitized image of a student's original, partly handwritten register entry. Users may search and comment on individual entries, thus expanding the information on single students. Places of origin are geo-tagged and displayed on interactive maps. Additional links refer to professors that were active at the time of matriculation (see: Catalogus Professorum Rostochiensium) and lectures held. Integrated Authority Files (GNDs) identify notable students and interlink them with further personal data in web portals and platforms on the Internet.
