= Nils von Rosenstein =

Swedish civil servant and enlightenment propagator

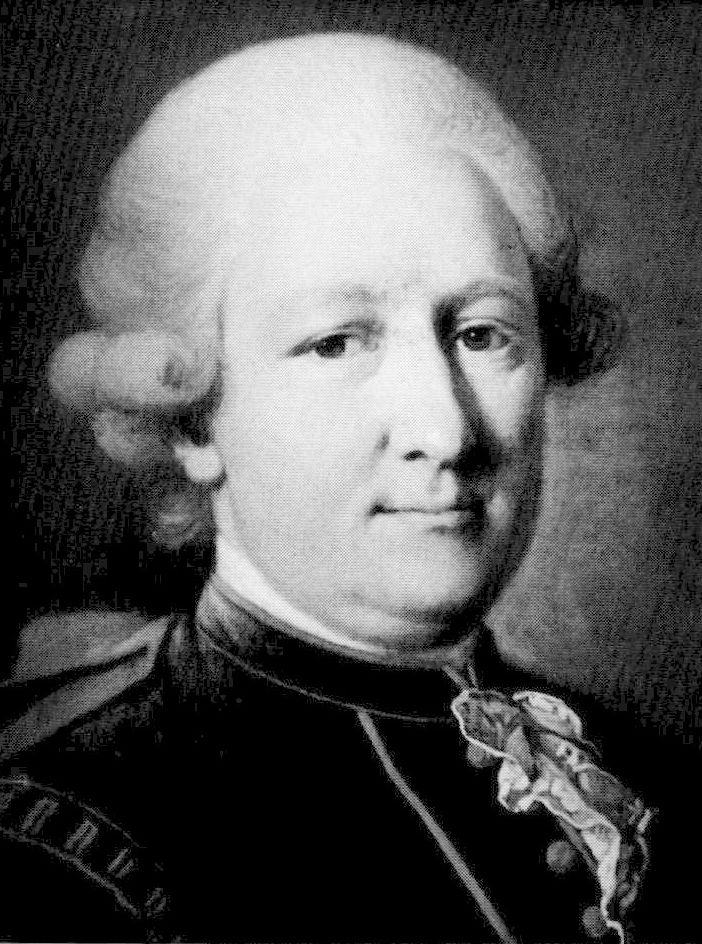
Nils von Rosenstein, painting by Per Krafft the elder.

Nils von Rosenstein (1 December 1752 — 7 August 1824) was a Swedish civil servant and propagator for enlightenment thinking. He served as tutor to the future King Gustav IV Adolf for eleven years (1784–1795) and as the first permanent secretary of the Swedish Academy. He served as president of the Christian education society Pro Fide et Christianismo. He was the son of physician Professor Nils Rosén von Rosenstein.

== Notes ==
Cultural offices
| Preceded by First holder | Swedish Academy; Seat No.11; 1786–1824 | Succeeded by Lars Magnus Enberg |
