= Diocese of Linköping =

Church of Sweden diocese

Diocese of Linköping Diocesis Lincopensis Linköpings stift
- Arms of the diocese of Linköping

- Flag

Location
- Country: Sweden
- Deaneries: 9 kontrakt
- Coordinates: 58°24′40″N 15°37′02″E

Statistics
- Parishes: 56
- Congregations: 109

Information
- Denomination: Church of Sweden
- Established: 12th century
- Cathedral: Linköping Cathedral

Current leadership
- Bishop: Marika Markovits
- Metropolitan Archbishop: Martin Modéus

Map

Website
- svenskakyrkan.se/linkopingsstift

The Diocese of Linköping (Swedish: Linköpings stift) is a diocese within the Church of Sweden administering the Östergötland County, the north eastern part of Jönköping County and the northern part of Kalmar County. It comprises nine deaneries subdivided into 176 parishes with a total of 443,000 members. The diocese's largest parish is Motala. The Diocese of Linköping has a rank directly below the Archdiocese of Uppsala of the Church of Sweden. The current bishop is Marika Markovits.

The diocesan territory comprises Östergötland County and parts of Jönköping and Kalmar County. It has 212 parishes with a total of 443,000 members.

== Pre-Reformation history ==
The diocese originally included Småland, Östergötland, the Islands of Gotland and Öland. The district of Värend in Småland was taken from Linköping and formed into the Diocese of Växjö about 1160. From 990 to 1100 the Diocese of Skara embraced the whole country of the Goths (Gauthiod); it was then divided between those of Skara and Linköping. The diocese was a suffragan of the Archdiocese of Bremen, and became a suffragan of the Diocese of Lund, when the latter was elevated to an archdiocese in 1104.

The first three bishops of Linköping were Herbert, Richard and Gisle (c. 1138–48). Then came Stenar, who apparently resigned in 1160 and subsequently became Bishop of Vexiö. Notable bishops after him were Kol (c. 1160–96), who died on a pilgrimage in Jerusalem, Bengt Magnusson, who was killed at the Battle of Lihula in Estonia on 8 August 1220, and Benedict (1220–37). The last Catholic bishop of Linköping was Hans Brask (born 1464; bishop, 1513–27; died 30 July 1539). He was compelled to leave his diocese in 1527 owing to the adoption of Lutheranism in Sweden at the Diet of Västerås.

=== Council of Skenninge ===
Of the numerous provincial and diocesan synods held in the Diocese of Linköping, the Council of Skenninge (1248) was the most important. The papal legate, Cardinal William of Sabina, presided and the celibacy of the clergy was strongly enforced. The following religious institutions were set up in the diocese between the twelfth and the sixteenth centuries: the cathedral chapter, which consisted at the time of the Reformation of a dean, an archdeacon, a subdean, nine canons and fifteen other prebendaries; the Cistercians had three houses for men, the abbeys of Alvastra, the mother-house of the Cistercian Order in Sweden, in Östergötland and Nydala in Småland, both founded in 1143, and Gutvalla (Roma) in Gotland; also four nunneries, Vreta Abbey (1160), Askaby, Byarum, dissolved about 1250 and the nuns transferred to Sko (in Upland) and Solberga Abbey (Gotland); the Brigittines, who had the great Abbey of Vadstena; the Dominicans, who possessed priories at Skenninge (1220?), Visby (1240) and Kalmar, as well as nunneries at Skenninge (1260) and Kalmar (1286). There were hospitals at Linköping, Visby (2), Söderköping (2) Skenninge (2), Kalmar (2), Norrabygd (Uknabäck) and on the Island of Öland. Most of these institutions were suppressed at the Reformation.

== Gallery ==
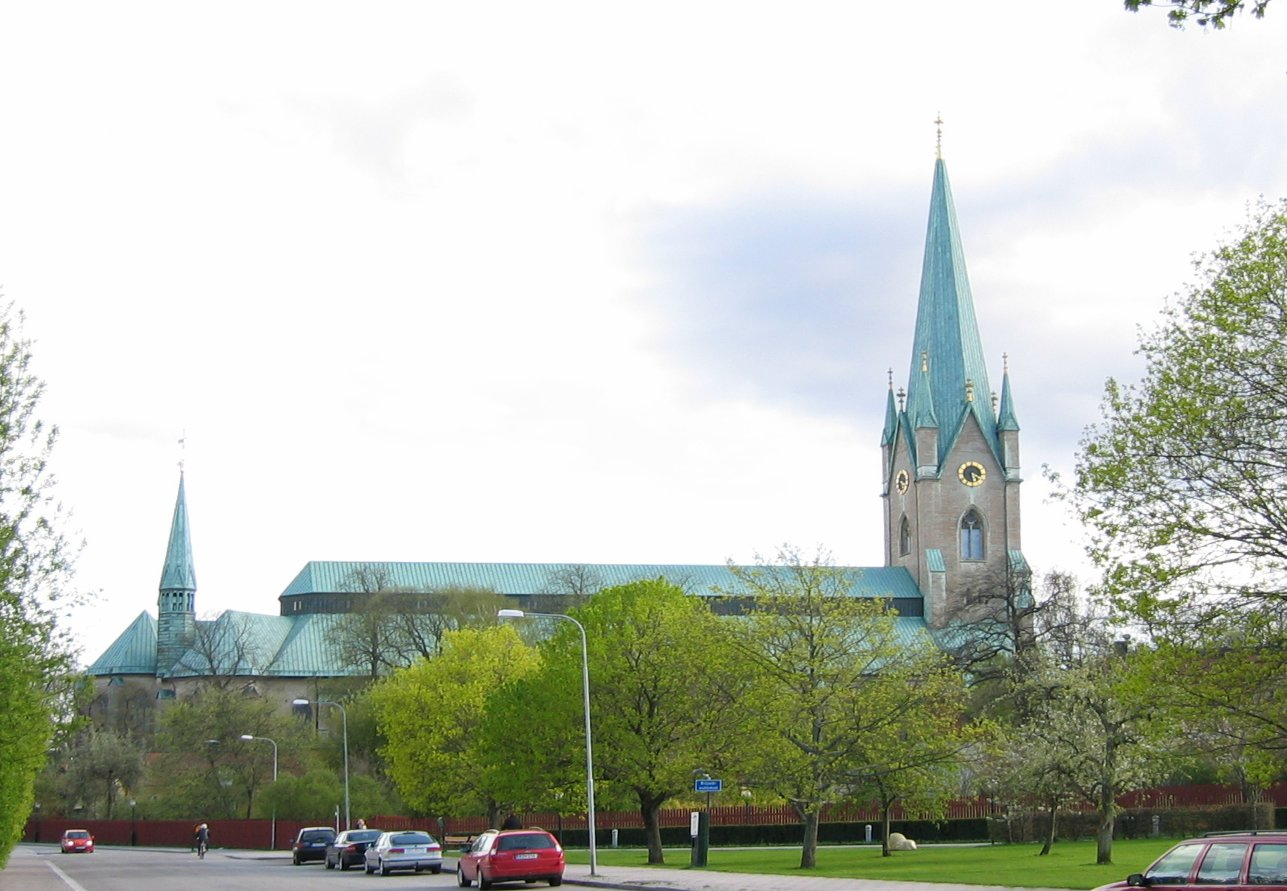
Linköping Cathedral

Nicolaus Hermanni (Nils Hermansson), bishop of Linköping, born in 1326 and died 1391

== See also ==
- List of bishops of Linköping
