= Aleksi Lehtonen =

Finnish bishop (1891–1951)

The Most Reverend Aleksi Lehtonen
- Archbishop of Turku and Finland
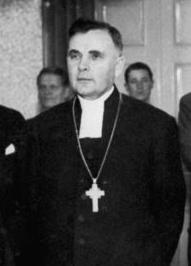
- Church: Evangelical Lutheran Church of Finland
- Archdiocese: Turku
- Appointed: 14 March 1945
- In office: 1945–1951
- Predecessor: Erkki Kaila
- Successor: Ilmari Salomies
- Previous post: Bishop of Tampere (1934-1945)

Orders
- Ordination: 10 June 1911
- Consecration: 1934

Personal details
- Born: 21 June 1891 Uusikaupunki, Grand Duchy of Finland, Russian Empire Present-day Finland
- Died: 27 March 1951 (aged 59) Turku, Finland
- Denomination: Lutheran
- Parents: Emanuel Johansson Lehtonen & Fransiska Sofia Josefsdotter
- Spouse: Kyllikki Margareta af Hällström
- Children: 6

Ordination history of Aleksi Lehtonen
History
Priestly ordination
- Date: 10 June 1911
Episcopal consecration
- Principal consecrator: Erkki Kaila
- Co-consecrators: Max von Bonsdorff; Erling Eidem
- Date: 1934

Aleksi Emanuel Lehtonen (21 June 1891 – 27 March 1951) was archbishop of Turku from 1945 till 1951.

== Education ==
Lehtonen was born on 21 June 1891 in Uusikaupunki. He attended school in Uusikaupunki, where he graduated as a student at the age of 16. He studied theology at the University of Helsinki and graduated in 1911. He graduated with a Bachelor of Theology in 1917 and a Licentiate in 1921. He earned his Doctor of Theology in 1923.

== Career ==
He was ordained to priesthood on 10 June 1911 and was appointed as priest in Lavia. In 1917 he became vicar of a parish in Helsinki and in 1922 he was appointed assistant professor of pastoral theology in University of Helsinki. In 1932 he became the Professor of Practical Theology.

After the sudden departure of Bishop Jaakko Gummerus, Lehtonen was elected Bishop of Tampere in 1934. He was consecrated that same year in Tampere Cathedral by three bishops, Erkki Kaila of Viipuri, Max von Bonsdorff of Borgå and Erling Eidem of Uppsala. It was through him that the apostolic succession was reinstated in the Church of Finland through the consecration initiated by Erling Eidem, the Archbishop of Uppsala. Nevertheless, even though the apostolic succession was considered an important factor to reinstate, it was not considered a requirement by the Finnish Church for a valid consecration. Lehtonen was appointed Archbishop of Turku on 14 March 1945, and was installed on 10 June in Turku Cathedral. He was active in the Ecumenical movement and sought Evangelical Lutheran Church of Finland to have closer relationship with Church of England. His son Samuel Lehtonen became Bishop of Helsinki.

Titles in Lutheranism
Preceded by Erkki Kaila	Archbishop of Turku and Finland; 1945 – 1951	Succeeded by Ilmari Salomies
Preceded by Jaakko Gummerus	Bishop of Tampere; 1934 – 1945	Succeeded by Eelis Gulin
