= Juvelius =

Juvelius is a Finnish surname. Notable people with the surname include:

- Einar W. Juva (né Juvelius, 1892–1966), Finnish historian
- Mikko Juva (né Juvelius, 1918–2004), Finnish historian, theologian and Lutheran archbishop
