= Ajankohtainen kakkonen =

Defunct Finnish television series broadcast on Yle TV2 from 1969 to 2015

- Promotional image
- Genre: Current affairs
- Country of origin: Finland
- Original language: Finnish

Production
- Production company: Yle

Original release
- Network: Yle TV2
- Release: 1969 – 2015

Ajankohtainen kakkonen (lit. 'Topical two') is a Finnish current affairs television series broadcast in Finland on Yle TV2 from 1969 to 2015. It aired every Tuesday at 21.00 EET.

== Notable episodes ==
=== A2 Teema: Homoilta ===
On 12 October 2010, the program had a special panel discussion episode, A2 Teema, with the title Homoilta (literally "Gay Night", loosely "From Gay People"). The 18 guests included opponents and proponents of a gender-neutral marriage law allowing gay marriages, including Christian Democrat MP Päivi Räsänen, Bishop of Diocese of Tampere Matti Repo, True Finns' MP Pentti Oinonen, Bible teacher Pasi Turunen (all four opponents), pastor Leena Huovinen (who has blessed lesbian couples), openly gay Green League MP Oras Tynkkynen, board member of SETA Manne Maalismaa and Mr. Gay Finland Kenneth Liukkonen (all four proponents). The following week saw an unprecedentedly high number of people leaving the Evangelical Lutheran Church through the website eroakirkosta.fi.

On 16 March 2011, Homoilta won the award for Finnish Journalistic Contribution of the Year, awarded by the media company Bonnier.
