= Kersti Juva =

Finnish translator (born 1948)

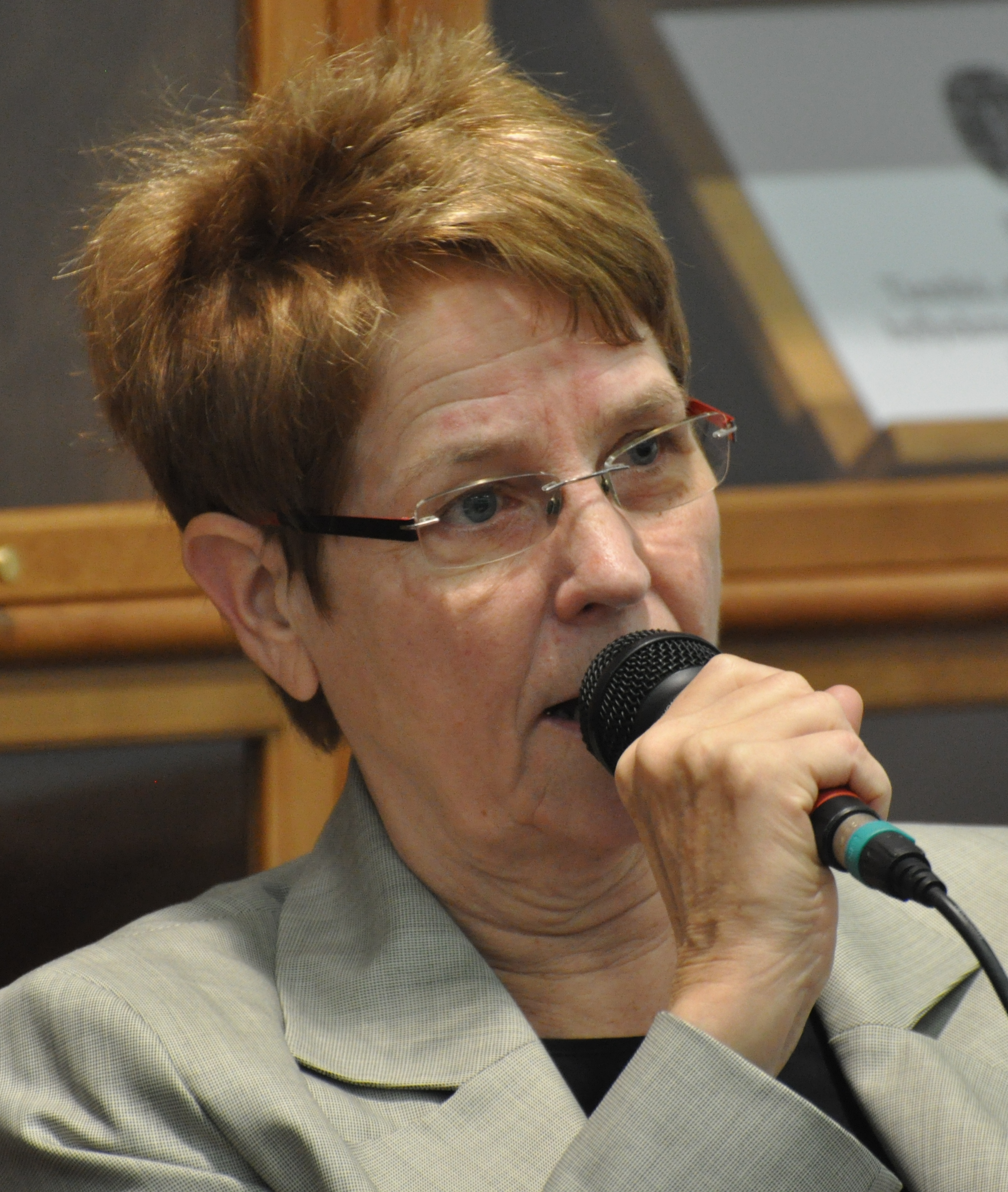
- Born: Kersti Anna Linnea Juva; 17 September 1948; Helsinki, Finland
- Occupations: professor, translator
- Years active: 1972–present

Kersti Anna Linnea Juva (born 17 September 1948) is a Finnish translator, recognized in particular for her translation into Finnish of J.R.R. Tolkien's The Lord of the Rings trilogy, for which she won the State Prize for Literature in 1976. Her translations of Shakespeare have been acclaimed for preserving the iambic pentameter of the verses. She was awarded the Mikael Agricola Translation Prize by the Finnish Association of Translators and Interpreters and Finnish Book Foundation for her translations of The Life and Opinions of Tristram Shandy, Gentleman in 1999. In 2014, she was inducted into the European Science Fiction Society's Hall of Fame for her translation work. An open lesbian, she is a vocal advocate for the homosexual community in Finland.

== Early life ==
Kersti Anna Linnea Juva was born in 1948 in Helsinki, Finland to Riitta and Mikko Juva. Her mother was a psychiatrist and her father Mikko Juva was a professor at the University of Helsinki, and would later serve as a professor at the University of Turku, a member of the Finnish parliament, and Archbishop of Finland. Her grandfather, Einar W. Juva was a professor and the chancellor of the University of Turku. The family lived in the Töölö neighborhood of Helsinki, but spent the summers at Punjo Manor in Nuuksio. Her father had a large library of books, and the family employed domestic workers from various parts of the country. As a result, from an early age, Juva was exposed to the richness of the Finnish language. At the end of the 1950s, her father moved the family to Turku and Juva, who found it hard to make friends there, spent a lot of time in the library.

Juva moved back to Helsinki to complete her high schooling, and then began her studies at the University of Helsinki in the late 1960s. She joined the student movement and Academic Socialist Society, but eventually left the organization over their homophobia. During this time, Juva spent eight years in therapy attempting to come to terms with her sexuality. At the time, not only was homosexuality considered deviant and a sin, it was also a crime. She eventually repudiated her lesbianism and married. Though she was fond of her husband, she came out of the closet when she was 30, recognizing her love for a woman. Taking translation courses with Eila Pennanen, the two became friends and Juva was influenced to try a career in translation. She studied linguistics with Viljo Tervonen, graduating with her bachelor's degree in 1972.

== Career ==
Soon after finishing her schooling, Juva was having coffee at the Copper Pan Restaurant with Pennanen, who mentioned she had been offered the translation of The Lord of the Rings, but did not have time to do the project because of other work commitments. Juva offered to take on the project, if Pennanen would supervise her work. Pennanen agreed and the two worked together on the translations of the first two volumes, released in 1973 and 1974. For the 1975 release of the third volume, Kuninkaan Paluu (Return of the King), Juva worked alone and her translation was recognized with the State Prize for Literature in 1976.

Juva went on to translate Watership Down (Finnish: Ruohometsän kansa) and Winnie the Pooh, as well as almost the entirety of Tolkien's body of work. In 1979, she fell in love with Mirkka Rekola and joined the Finnish sexual rights organization Seta, becoming active in LGBT advocacy. She made her sexual orientation public, and though her father was the Archbishop of Finland at the time, her parents were supportive. Juva moved to Oxford in 1985, living part of the year in England and part of the year in Nuuksio in the Espoo municipality. As she had previously studied English only as a university subject, she wanted to gain a deeper understanding of the language to improve her translations. That same year, she published her translation of The Hobbit (Finnish: Hobitti) for which she was awarded a second State Literature Prize, in 1986.

In the 1990s, Juva became challenged by the prospect of translating Laurence Sterne's Tristram Shandy, which was thought to be an impossible task. Encouraged by Professor Ritva Leppihalme, she began her master's studies, and wrote her thesis A Bumpy Ride. Translating non-narrative elements in Tristram Shandy, explaining the difficulties of translating the 18th-century work. In 1995, after the end of a relationship, Juva began attending church again and rekindled her interest in faith, joining the Finnish Orthodox Church. Around the same time, she met her future wife, Juliette Day, an Anglican liturgical researcher. For her translation of Sterne, Tristram Shandy: elämä ja mielipiteet, Juva was awarded the Finnish Literature Prize (Finnish: Suomi-palkinto) in 1998 and the Mikael Agricola Prize in 1999. She completed her master's degree in English Philology at the University of Helsinki in 2002.

Finland began a project to translate the Complete Works of Shakespeare into Finnish in 2004, and Juva and Day moved from Oxford to Llanddewi Brefi in West Wales. Juva was selected to work on the project because of her previous translation work and awards. Her work was noted for her preservation of the iambic pentameter of the verses and her spontaneous wording. In her preface to the translation of Much Ado About Nothing, Juva stated that the tradition of the iambic pentameter had been abandoned after the early-20th century in an attempt to modernize. She also noted that when Shakespeare was originally translated into Finnish, the editing of the English editions was not very professional and that changes in the Finnish language, which now incorporates double entendres, have made translation easier.

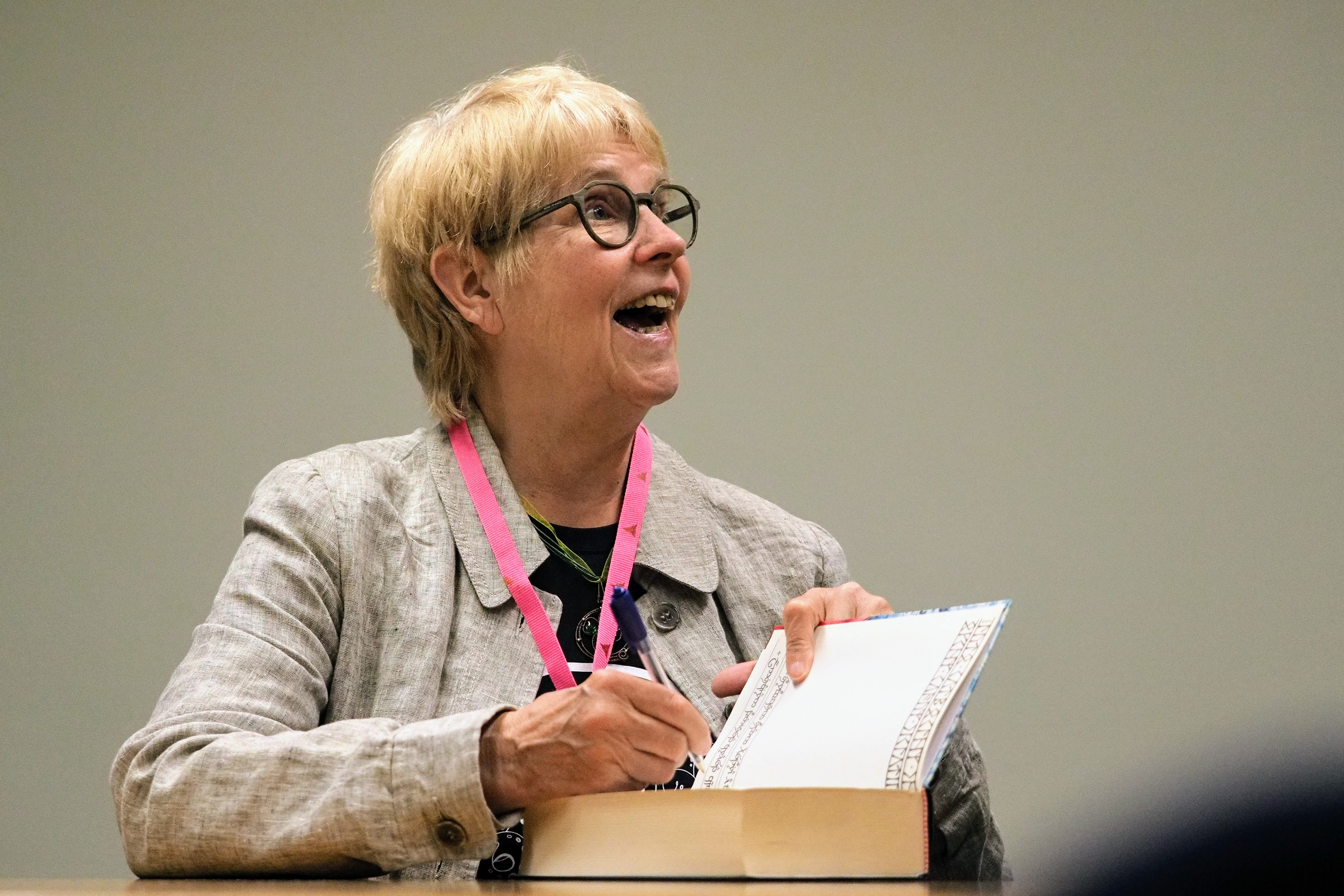
Juva signing a book at Finncon in 2019

In 2008, Juva became the first translator in Finland to be awarded an "artist professorship". She taught from 2008 to 2013, retiring in 2014 with a pension as a State Artist. Juva has translated over 100 literary works in the course of her career, including: L. Frank Baum's The Wonderful Wizard of Oz, Charles Dickens' Bleak House and Nicholas Nickleby, Henry James' Washington Square, and Alice Walker's The Color Purple. She has also produced numerous translations specifically adapted to theatrical and radio performance. Fascinated with Jane Austen, Juva completed a translation of Pride and Prejudice in 2013. In 2014, she was inducted into the Hall of Fame of the European Science Fiction Society for her translation work and was granted an honorary doctorate in philosophy by the University of Eastern Finland's Joensuu campus.

Juva and Day took a sabbatical in 2016 while Day researched a book at Yale University on church history. While they were in the United States, they participated in the 2017 Women's March and then married, sending the paperwork home to Finland to convert their registered partnership to a marriage. The couple continue to divide their time between Finland and England, while Juva devotes her free time to advocating for acceptance and dialogue between the Orthodox Church and the LGBT community.

== Selected works ==
- Tolkien, J.R.R.; Pekkanen, Panu (1973). Juva, Kersti; Pennanen, Eila (eds.). Taru sormusten herrasta: 1 Sormuksen ritarit [The Fellowship of the Ring] (in Finnish). Porvoo; Helsinki: Werner Söderström Osakeyhtiö. ISBN 978-9-510-06012-4.
- Tolkien, J.R.R.; Pekkanen, Panu (1974). Juva, Kersti; Pennanen, Eila (eds.). Taru sormusten herrasta: 2 Kaksi tornia [Two Towers] (in Finnish). Porvoo: Werner Söderström Osakeyhtiö. ISBN 978-9-510-06504-4.
- Tolkien, J.R.R.; Pekkanen, Panu (1975). Juva, Kersti (ed.). Taru sormusten herrasta: 3 Kuninkaan Paluu [The Return of the King] (in Finnish). Porvoo: Werner Söderström Osakeyhtiö. ISBN 978-9-510-06009-4.
- Tolkien, J.R.R.; Pekkanen, Panu (1979). Juva, Kersti (ed.). Silmarillion (in Finnish). Porvoo: Werner Söderström Osakeyhtiö. ISBN 978-9-510-15222-5.
- Tolkien, J.R.R.; Pekkanen, Panu (1985). Juva, Kersti (ed.). Hobitti, eli, Sinne ja takaisin [The Hobbit, There and Back Again] (in Finnish). Porvoo: Werner Söderström Osakeyhtiö. ISBN 978-9-510-13055-1.
- Tolkien, J.R.R.; Pekkanen, Panu (1986). Tolkien, Christopher; Juva, Kersti (eds.). Keskeneräisten tarujen kirja [Unfinished Tales on Númenor and Middle-Earth] (in Finnish). Porvoo: Werner Söderström Osakeyhtiö. ISBN 978-9-510-13429-0.
- Adams, Richard (1994). Juva, Kersti (ed.). Ruohometsän kansa [Watership Down] (in Finnish). Helsinki: Yleisradio. OCLC 58056636.
- Sterne, Laurence; Juva, Kersti (1998). Tristram Shandy: elämä ja mielipiteet [Tristram Shandy: Life and Opinions] (in Finnish). Porvoo: Werner Söderström Osakeyhtiö. ISBN 978-9-510-22770-1.
- Milne, A. A. (2001). Juva, Kersti (ed.). Nalle Puhin satulipas [Winnie the Pooh, Saddle Bags] (in Finnish). Helsinki. ISBN 951-025-748-6.
- Juva, Kersti (2002). A Bumpy Ride. Translating Non-narrative Elements in Tristram Shandy (master's). Helsinki: University of Helsinki.
- Milne, A.A. (2002). Juva, Kersti (ed.). Nalle Puh käy kylässä [Pooh goes visiting] (in Finnish). Helsinki: Werner Söderström Osakeyhtiö. ISBN 978-9-510-27049-3.
- Shakespeare, William (2009). Juva, Kersti (ed.). Paljon melua tyhjästä [Much Ado about Nothing] (in Finnish). Helsinki: Werner Söderström Osakeyhtiö. ISBN 978-9-510-33063-0.
- Austen, Jane (2013). Juva, Kersti (ed.). Ylpeys ja ennakkoluulo [Pride and Prejudice] (in Finnish). Helsinki: Teos. ISBN 978-9-518-51554-1.

== Awards and recognition ==
- 1976 State Prize for Literature, for J. R. R. Tolkien's, Return of the King.
- 1986 State Prize for Literature, for J. R. R. Tolkien's The Hobbit.
- 1998 Finnish Literature Prize, for Tristram Shandy.
- 1999 Mikael Agricola Translation Prize of the Finnish Association of Translators and Interpreters and Finnish Book Foundation, for Tristram Shandy.
- 2006 Finnish Cultural Foundation Prize
- 2014 Hall of Fame in the field of translation by European Science Fiction Society
