= Juva (surname) =

Juva is a Finnish-language surname. Notable people with the surname include:

- Einar W. Juva (1892–1966), Finnish historian and professor
- Mikko Juva (1918–2004), Finnish Lutheran archbishop, historian and theologist
