= Bo-Göran Åstrand =

- Bishop of Borgå
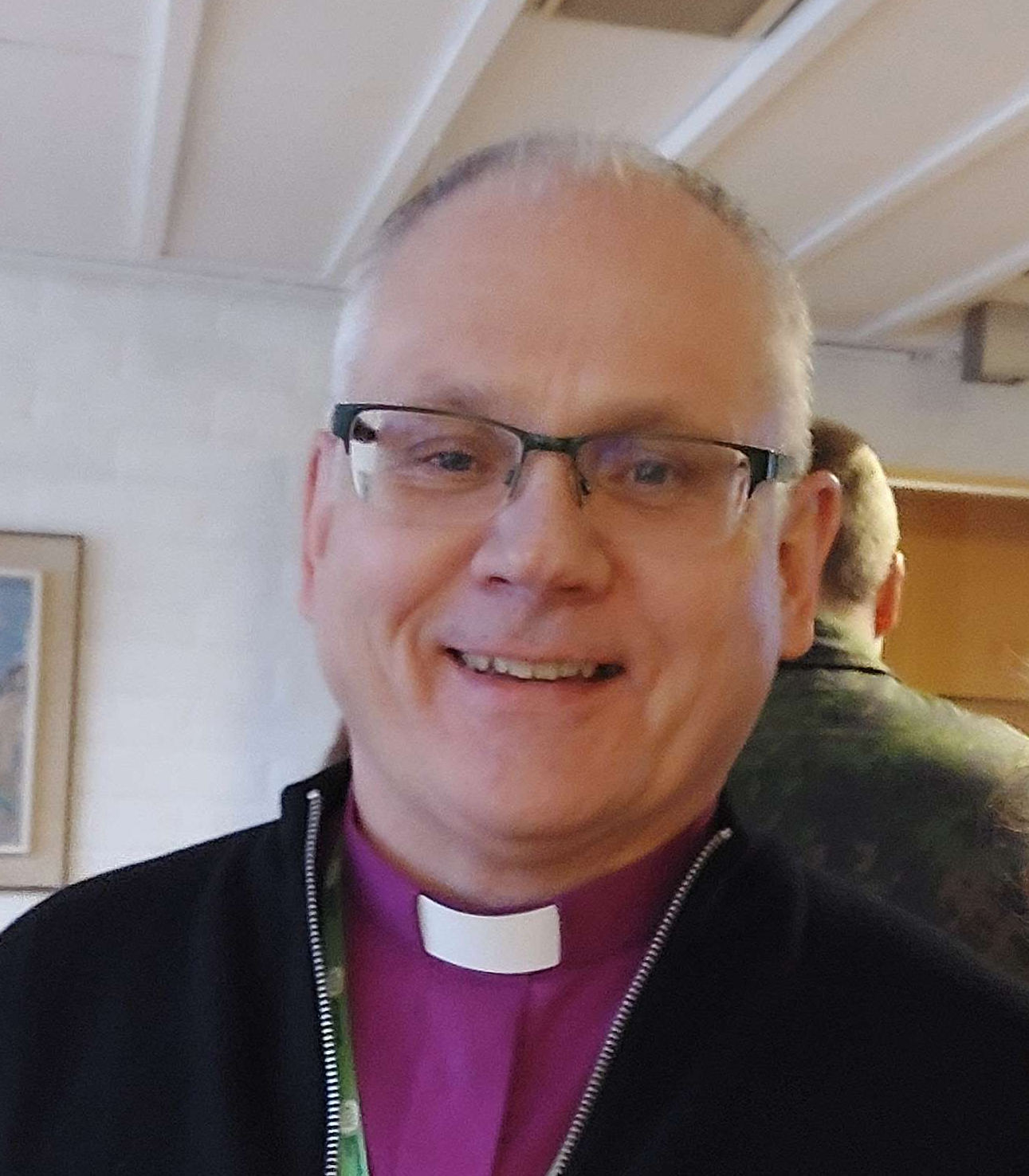
- Åstrand in 2023
- Church: Evangelical Lutheran Church of Finland
- Diocese: Diocese of Borgå
- Elected: 29 September 2019
- Predecessor: Björn Vikström

Personal details
- Born: 14 November 1964 (age 61) Purmo, Ostrobothnia, Finland
- Education: Master of Theology
- Alma mater: Åbo Akademi University
- Coat of arms

Bo-Göran Åstrand, born 14 November 1964 in Purmo in Finland, is a Finland-Swedish priest. On September 1, 2019, he assumed the position of bishop of the Swedish-speaking diocese, the Diocese of Borgå, in Finland.

== Biography ==
Bo-Göran Åstrand holds a Master of Theology degree from Åbo Akademi University and was ordained as a priest in 1991.

Åstrand has worked as a priest in the Swedish-speaking parish of Jakobstad, serving as parish pastor from 1991 to 1994, chaplain from 1995 to 2007, and vicar from 2007 to 2019. He was elected as a clergy representative in the Church Synod—the highest decision-making body of the Evangelical Lutheran Church of Finland—from 2004 to 2007 and again from 2012 to 2019.

Åstrand was one of the candidates in the episcopal elections in the Diocese of Borgå in both 2006 and 2009. In both elections, he placed third, in 2006 missing second place by just one vote. In the 2019 episcopal election, he was one of four candidates. In the second round, he ran against Sixten Ekstrand, whom he defeated with 309 votes to 265. He was thereby elected as the new bishop, succeeding Björn Vikström.

Åstrand assumed the role of bishop on September 1, 2019, and was consecrated on Michaelmas, September 29 of the same year.

== Personal life ==
Bo-Göran Åstrand is married to deaconess Karin Åstrand, and together they have four children. Åstrand resides in Borgå.

== Publications ==
- Mitt i allt – medförfattare till konfirmandhandbok utgiven av Fontana Media. ISBN 951-550-640-9
- Mitt i allt: Ledarhandledning för konfirmandhandboken – medförfattare, utgiven av Fontana Media. ISBN 951-550-644-1
- Fruktkoden. Lösenord till det goda livet – medförfattare, utgiven av Fontana Media. ISBN 9789515506924
