= Kari Mäkinen =

Finnish prelate (born 1955)

The Most Reverend Kari Mäkinen
- Archbishop of Turku and Finland
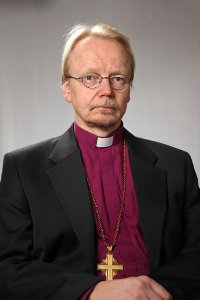
- Kari Mäkinen in 2013.
- Archdiocese: Turku
- In office: 2010–2018
- Predecessor: Jukka Paarma
- Successor: Tapio Luoma

Orders
- Ordination: 1979
- Consecration: 2006 by Jukka Paarma

Personal details
- Born: 5 January 1955 (age 71) Pori, Finland
- Denomination: Lutheran
- Spouse: Eija Mäkinen

Kari Mäkinen (born 5 January 1955) is the former archbishop of the Evangelical Lutheran Church of Finland. He was elected the 14th Archbishop of Turku and Finland on 11 March 2010, he was installed on 6 June 2010, and he retired on 1 June 2018. His successor, the 15th Archbishop Tapio Luoma was installed on 3 June 2018. His predecessor was Jukka Paarma. Previously Mäkinen served as vicar of Ulvila and since 2006 as Bishop of Turku.

== History ==
He was born in Pori, and graduated with a Bachelor of Theology in 1979, now equivalent to a master's degree, and received his licentiate in 1987. After defending his thesis in 1989 he became a Doctor of Theology. He worked in the parishes of Roihuvuori and Lauttasaari, Helsinki from 1979 to 1984. He then worked in the parishes of Länsi-Pori and Ulvila from 1989 to 1993. Between 1984 and 1989, he also worked as a full-time researcher. His election to the vicariate of Ulvila occurred in 1994, and he held the position until 2005. During his years as vicar of Ulvila he simultaneously worked as an assistant in the Archdiocese of Turku. He has also had several positions of trust in multiple organisations. On the second ballot of 2010, he was voted to be the next Archbishop of Turku and Finland against Miikka Ruokanen. On 26 March 2013, he was the first archbishop to voice public support for (civil) same-sex marriage. Since then, however, he has changed his position.

On 28 October 2014, when the Finnish Parliament narrowly approved a citizen's initiative to legalize same-sex marriages, Mäkinen posted on his Facebook page with the following: "I know how much this day means to the rainbow community, their loved ones and many others. I rejoice with my whole heart for them and with them".

In March 2016, Mäkinen promised that the church would protect refugees whose request for asylum was rejected by the Finnish immigration officials. Approximately one thousand Finns resigned their church membership in the days following his statement.

== Personal ==
Mäkinen is married to hospital chaplain Eija Mäkinen. They have four children (born 1981, 1984, 1988, 1988).

== Honors ==
- Commander Grand Cross of the Order of the Lion of Finland (Finland, 2014)

== Publications ==
- Hämärässä kypsyy aamu. Helsinki: Kirjapaja, 1986. ISBN 951-621-648-X. (collection of poems)
- Unelma jälkikristillisestä kulttuurista ja uskonnosta. Tulenkantajien oppositio kansankirkollista arvomaailmaa vastaan 1924–1930. Helsinki: Suomen Kirkkohistoriallinen Seura, 1989. ISBN 951-902-173-6.

(doctoral dissertation)

Titles in Lutheranism
Preceded by Jukka Paarma	Archbishop of Turku and Finland; 2010 – 2018	Succeeded by Tapio Luoma
Preceded by Ilkka Kantola	Bishop of Turku; 2006 – 2010	Succeeded by Kaarlo Kalliala
