= Porvoo Cathedral =

Evangelical Lutheran church in Finland

Coordinates: 60°23′50″N 25°39′27″E

Porvoo Cathedral in September 2024

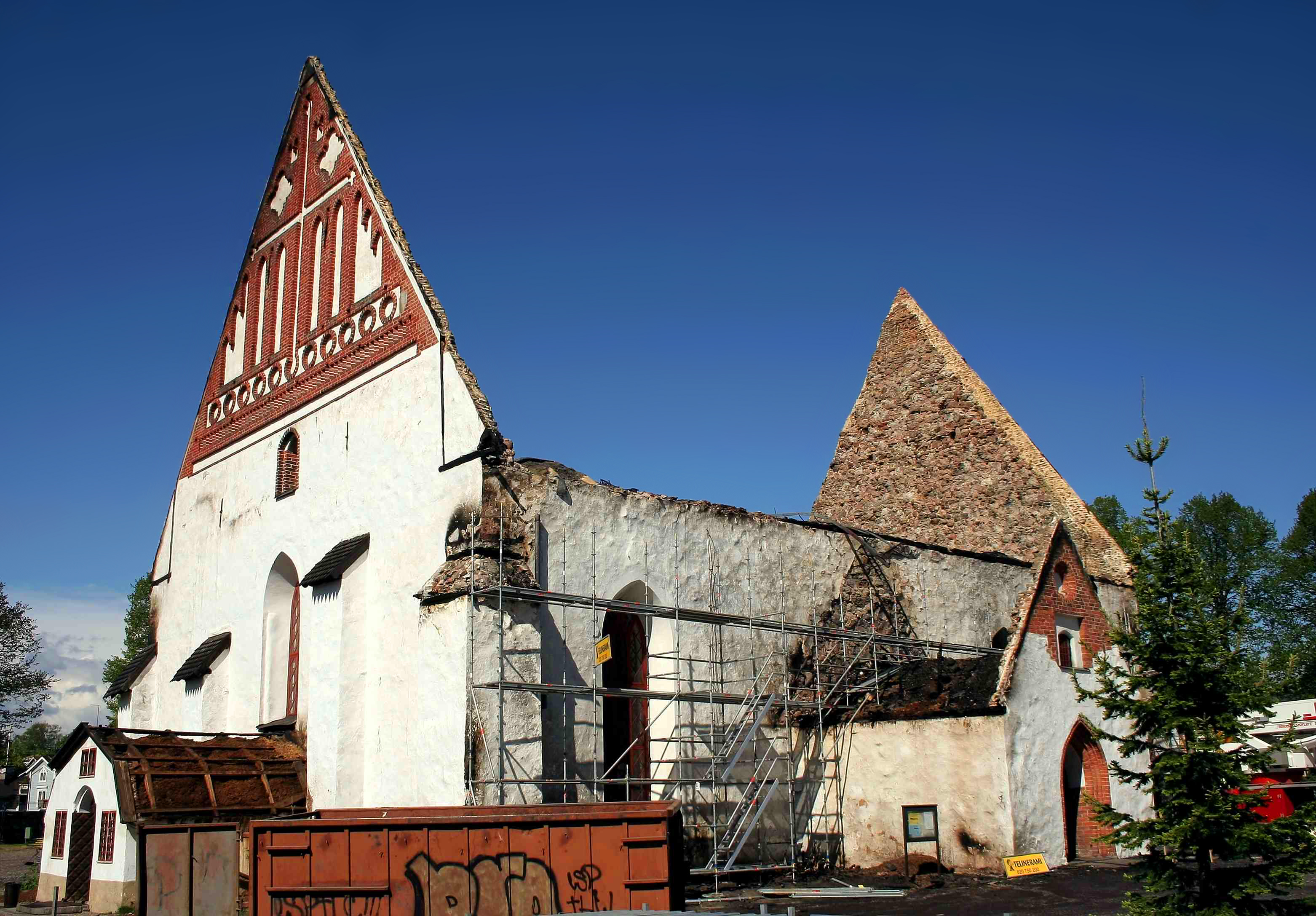
Porvoo Cathedral after arson in May 2006; the cathedral's roof has been reconstructed

Porvoo Cathedral (Finnish: Porvoon tuomiokirkko; Swedish: Borgå domkyrka) is a cathedral of the Evangelical Lutheran Church of Finland in Porvoo, Finland. It was built in the 15th century, although the oldest parts date from the 13th century. It is the seat of the Diocese of Borgå, Finland's Swedish-speaking diocese (Borgå is the Swedish language form of Porvoo). The cathedral is also used for services by the Porvoo Finnish-speaking parish, which is administratively part of the Diocese of Helsinki. The church first became a cathedral in 1723, when the diocese of Viipuri (Viborg) (now the Diocese of Tampere) moved to Porvoo, after Vyborg was ceded to Russia in the Treaty of Nystad.

== History ==
The church was originally made of wood. The first stone walls were built between 1410 and 1420, and in about 1450, the church was expanded 4 meters (13 ft) towards the east and 6 meters (20 ft) towards the south.

The church has been destroyed by fire numerous times; in 1508 by Danish forces and in 1571, 1590 and 1708 by Russian forces. It was also badly damaged in 1941 by a bomb dropped by Russian forces during the Continuation War, even though the bomb didn't explode. On 29 May 2006, the outer roof collapsed in a fire, but with the inner ceiling undamaged and the cathedral interiors intact. An 18-year-old man was convicted of arson and sentenced to six and a half years in prison. The cathedral was reopened on 2 July 2008.

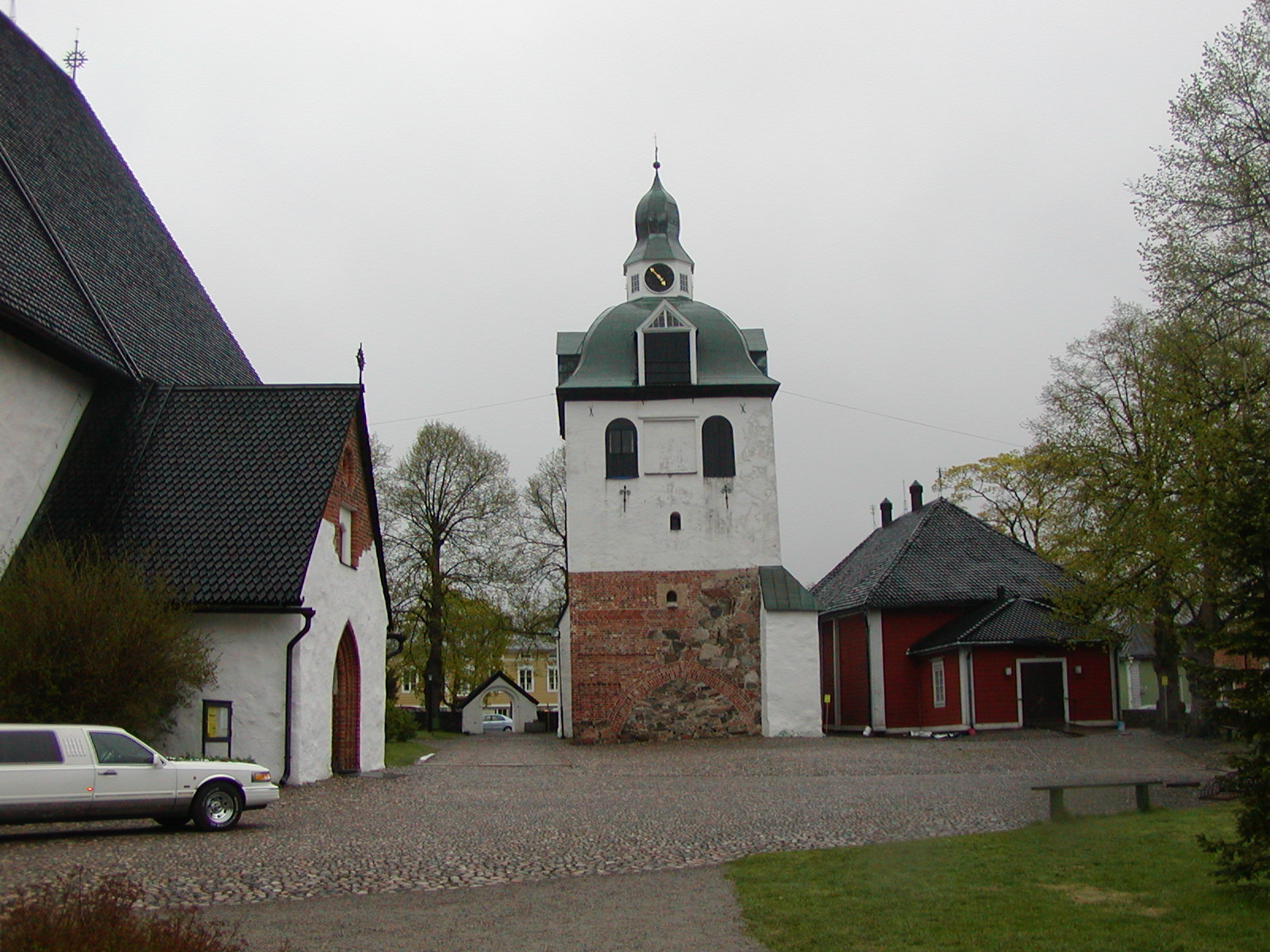
The separate belltower

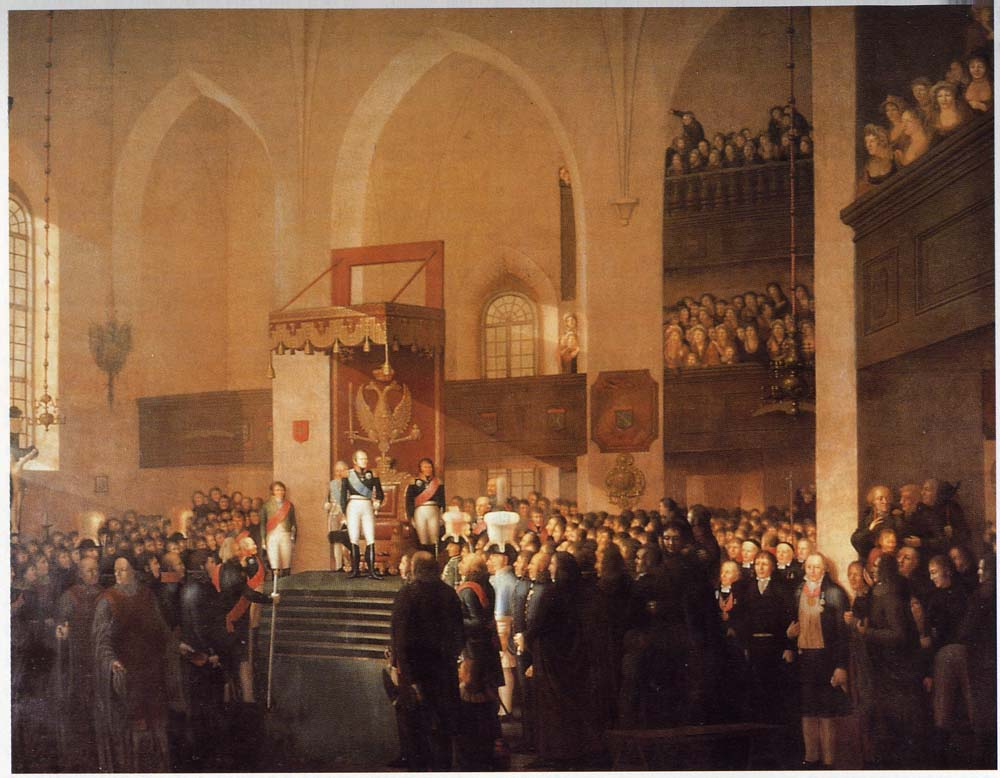
Tsar Alexander I opens the Diet of Porvoo in the cathedral, 1809

The cathedral was the site of the opening of the first Diet of Finland on 28 March 1809, at which Finland was declared an autonomous Grand Duchy, with the Emperor of Russia (Czar / Tsar) as the Grand Duke of Finland.

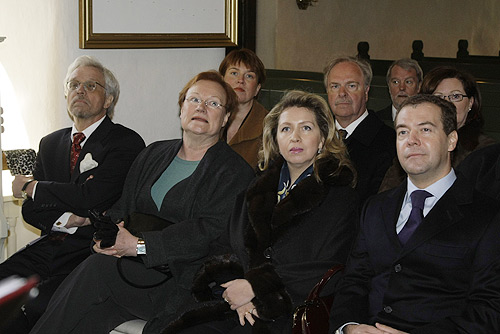
From right to left: Russian President Dmitry Medvedev, his wife Svetlana Medvedeva, Finnish President Tarja Halonen and her husband Pentti Arajärvi at the Porvoo Cathedral in 2009

The cathedral hosted the joint celebration Eucharist to mark the signing of a formal agreement between the British and Irish Anglican churches and the Nordic (Scandinavian) and Baltic Lutheran churches (completed in 1992), which took its name from Porvoo as the Porvoo Common Statement theological agreement, forming the Porvoo Communion was adopted.
