= Ilmari Salomies =

The Most Reverend Ilmari Salomies
- Archbishop of Turku and Finland
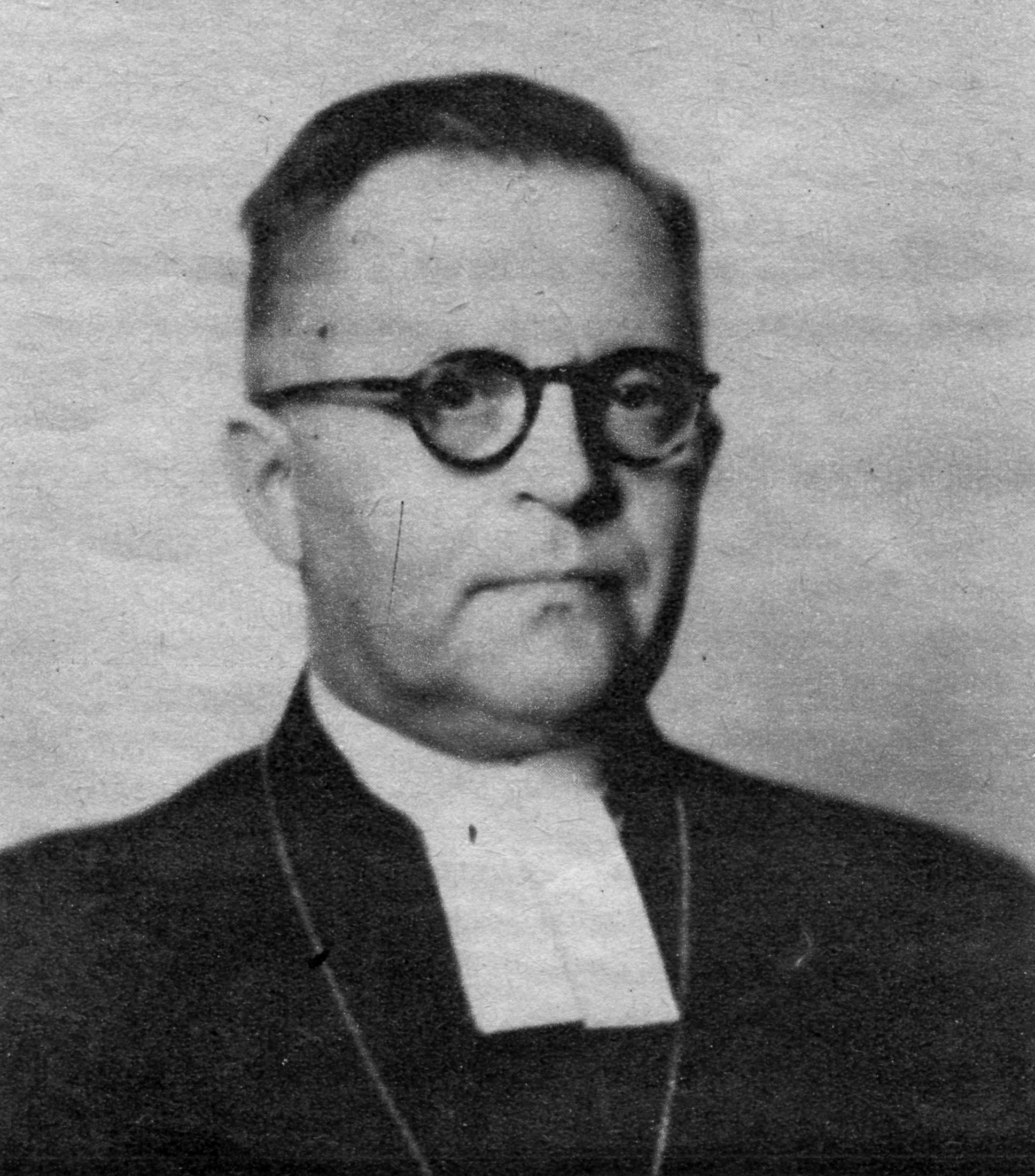
- Church: Evangelical Lutheran Church of Finland
- Archdiocese: Turku
- In office: 1951–1964
- Predecessor: Aleksi Lehtonen
- Successor: Martti Simojoki
- Previous post: Bishop of Mikkeli (1943-1951)

Orders
- Ordination: 1920
- Consecration: 13 June 1943 by Erkki Kaila

Personal details
- Born: 17 July 1893 Mikkeli, Grand Duchy of Finland, Russian Empire Present-day Finland
- Died: 26 December 1973 (aged 80) Helsinki, Finland
- Denomination: Lutheran
- Parents: Edvard Salonen & Hedvig Sofia Salonen
- Spouse: Kirsti Hildén

Ilmari Johannes Salomies, previously Salonen (17 July 1893 – 26 December 1973, Helsinki), was the Archbishop of Turku, and the spiritual head of the Evangelical Lutheran Church of Finland between 1951 and 1964.

== Biography ==
Salomies was born on 17 July 1893 in Mikkeli, the son of Edvard Salonen and Hedvig Sofia Salonen.

From 1931 he taught church history at the University of Helsinki. In 1938 he became a full professor of ecclesiastical history. He was elected Bishop of Viipuri in February 1943 and consecrated on 13 June by Archbishop Erkki Kaila of Turku and Bishop Yrjö Wallinmaa of Oulu in Turku Cathedral. In 1945 the diocese's seat was transferred to Mikkeli and the name of the diocese was changed to the Diocese of Mikkeli, with Salomies as the first bishop with that title. In 1951 he was elected Archbishop of Turku where he remained till 1964. He died on 26 December 1973 in Helsinki and was buried in the Hietaniemi Cemetery in Helsinki.

Titles in Lutheranism
Preceded by Aleksi Lehtonen	Archbishop of Turku and Finland; 1951 – 1959	Succeeded by Martti Simojoki
