= John Vikström =

Finnish priest and archbishop (born 1931)

The Most Reverend John Vikström
- Archbishop of Turku and Finland
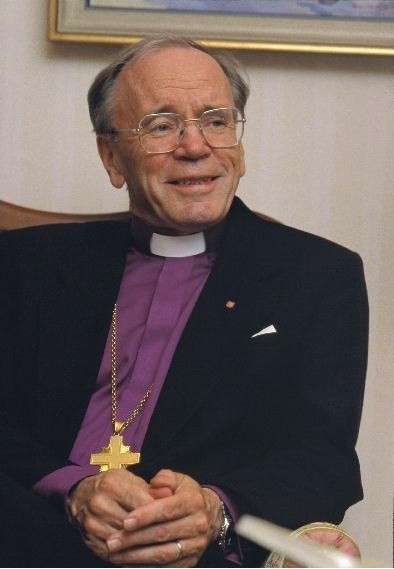
- Province: Western Finland
- Diocese: Archdiocese of Turku
- See: Turku Cathedral
- In office: 1982–1998
- Predecessor: Mikko Juva
- Successor: Jukka Paarma
- Previous post: Bishop of Borgå (1970–1982)

Orders
- Ordination: 1956 by Georg Olof Rosenqvist
- Consecration: 1970 by Martti Simojoki

Personal details
- Born: 1 October 1931 (age 94) Kronoby, Finland
- Denomination: Lutheran
- Spouse: Birgitta Vikström (deceased)

John Edvin Vikström (born 1 October 1931) is a Finnish priest. He served as the Archbishop of Turku and Finland from 1982 to 1998.

== Personal life ==
John Edvin Vikström was born to parents Edvin and Hilma Vikström. In 1957 he married teacher Birgitta Vikström (b. Hellberg) who died in 1994. John Vikström has three children. His brother Erik Vikström and his son Björn Vikström are both his successors as bishop of Porvoo/Borgå.

== Archbishop of Turku and Finland 1982–1998 ==
As the 53rd successor of St. Henry, Vikström's era was far reaching. During his term as the Archbishop of the Evangelical Lutheran Church of Finland, the Church carried out many reforms. The Church was given a new Bible translation and a new hymnbook, the ordained ministry has been opened to women, church law was reformed and liturgical reform was undertaken. The Church of Finland was also active ecumenically.

Archbishop emeritus John Vikström continues to be a popular speaker in academia and business.

John Vikström has also publicly embraced the idea of a basic income as a solution to social exclusion:

In this way, even working a little would be possible and would make sense. The system would not push people into idleness and divide citizens into winners and losers as cruelly as is the case now. I look at the question from the point of view of human dignity. A basic income paid to everyone would be less humiliating than the present benefit system can sometimes become. Basic income would send every citizen the following encouraging and motivating message: 'You are important. You are not a burden, but a resource. You are important by being a human being for others. Whatever work you do, in whatever situations, whether or not you are paid to do it, you still contribute to building our society.

The archbishop has placed the chairmanship of the Church's Social-Ethical Forum as his priority. The forum's aim is to resolve problems in the status of the elderly and poor in Finland.

An acclaimed author of numerous books and papers, his correspondence with Jörn Donner was voted as Book of the Year in 2002.

== Theological merits ==
Studies and career

- Helsinki University:
  - Bachelor of Theology (1956)
- Åbo Akademi:
  - Licenciate of Theology (1962)
  - Doctor of Theology (1966) (subject of doctorate: Religion and Culture)
- Stipendiate of World Council of Churches in Tübingen, Germany (1956–1957)
- Ordained 12 June 1956
- Ex officio position in the Esbo Swedish Parish (1957)
- Pastor of Diaconia in the Diocese of Borgå (1957–1961)
- Assistant of Systematic Theology (1963–1964), lecturer at Åbo Akademi (1966–1970)
- Associate Professor of Ethics and Philosophy of Religion at Åbo Akademi (1970)
- Bishop of the Diocese of Borgå (1970–1982)
- Archbishop of Turku and Finland (1982–1998)

Awards and prizes

- Honorary doctor:
  - Leningrad Theological Academy (1985)
  - Budapest Lutheran Theological Academy (1987)
  - Finlandia University, Hancock, United States (1998)
  - Åbo Akademi (2002)
  - University of Vaasa (2006)
- Hallberg Prize (1967)
- Swedish Cultural Fund Prize (1981)
- Decoration of the Grand Cross of German Democratic Republic (1989)
- Order of the White Rose – Grand Cross (1986)
- Cross of Apostle and Evangelist Mark, 1st Class (1989)
- Order of the Holy Lamb, Commander 1st Class (1991)
- Medal of Jordanian Independence, 1st Class (1993)
- Lambeth Cross (1994)
- Anders Chydenius Prize (1995)
- Swedish Finland Award, in silver (1996)
- Finland's Communal Union Award, in gold (1997)
- Friends of the Swedish Folk School Award (1998)
- Medal of Merit, Defence Forces of Finland, in gold (1998)
- Medal of Journalism and Press (1999)
- Cross of Maarjamaa (2001)
- Cross of St. Henry (2007)

== Bibliography ==
- Religion och kultur. Grundproblemet i G.G. Rosenqvists religiösa tänkande (1966)
- Religionssociologin i Finland (1967)
- Kyrka och revolution (1968)
- Kyrkan och kulturradikalismen (1968)
- Effekten av religiös fostran (1970)
- Tro i kris (1972) ISBN 951-550-020-6
- Fråga biskopen om tro (1980) ISBN 951-550-185-7
- Ihmisen usko (1982) ISBN 951-1-07084-3
- Herdestaven (1982) ISBN 951-550-230-6
- Kuitenkin (Trots allt) (1983) ISBN 951-550-265-9
- Uusi rohkeus elää (1985) ISBN 951-1-08339-2
- Kirjeen kääntöpiiri (Öppna svar) (with Eero Silvasti) (1987) ISBN 951-1-09359-2
- Suuntaviittoja (1988) ISBN 951-1-10277-X
- Myös maan päällä (1992)
- Reconciliation and Hope (1998)
- Att leva är att dö (2000) (with Jörn Donner) ISBN 951-550-580-1
- Vapaus ja vakaumus (2003) ISBN 951-607-089-2
- Toivo ja elämä (2005) ISBN 951-607-246-1

Titles in Lutheranism
Preceded by Mikko Juva	Archbishop of Turku and Finland; 1982–1998	Succeeded by Jukka Paarma
