= Seppo Häkkinen =

Finnish prelate (born 1958)

The Right Reverend Seppo Häkkinen
- Bishop of Mikkeli
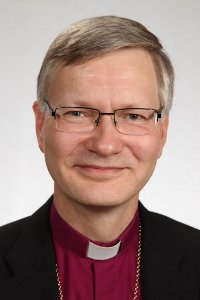
- Church: Evangelical Lutheran Church of Finland
- Diocese: Mikkeli
- Elected: 2009
- Predecessor: Voitto Huotari

Orders
- Ordination: 1983
- Consecration: 2009 by Jukka Paarma

Personal details
- Born: 2 June 1958 (age 68) Kuopio, Finland
- Spouse: Maria Häkkinen
- Children: 4
- Education: University of Helsinki

Seppo Auvo Antero Häkkinen (born 2 June 1958) is a Finnish prelate who has been bishop of the Diocese of Mikkeli since 2009.

== Biography ==
Seppo Häkkinen was born on 2 June 1958 in Kuopio. Häkkinen worked as Head of the Functional Department of the Church Council between 2002–2009, Heinola Provincial in Chapel between 1987-2001 and as an official assistant to the Imatra Ward between 1983–1987. Häkkinen is a Doctor of Theology. His dissertation, which was approved in 2010, dealt with the Church's membership and the church's commitment to resigning from the Church. In 2009 he was elected as Bishop of Mikkeli. Häkkinen's family includes his wife Maria and four children. He married in 1980.
