= Martti Simojoki =

The Most Reverend Martti Simojoki
- Archbishop of Turku and Finland
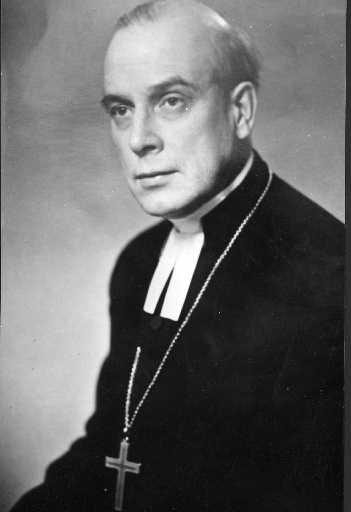
- Church: Evangelical Lutheran Church of Finland
- Archdiocese: Turku
- In office: 1964–1978
- Predecessor: Ilmari Salomies
- Successor: Mikko Juva
- Previous posts: Bishop of Mikkeli (1951–1959); Bishop of Helsinki (1959–1964)

Orders
- Ordination: 1930 by Jaakko Gummerus
- Consecration: 4 November 1951 by Eelis Gulin
- Rank: Archbishop

Personal details
- Born: 17 September 1908 Uusikaupunki Finland
- Died: 25 April 1999 (aged 90) Helsinki Finland
- Denomination: Lutheran

Ordination history of Martti Simojoki
History
Priestly ordination
- Ordained by: Jaakko Gummerus
Episcopal consecration
- Principal consecrator: Eelis Gulin
- Co-consecrators: Max von Bonsdorff; Hans Fuglsang-Damgaard; George Ingle; Johannes Björklund

Martti Ilmari Simojoki, previously Simelius (17 September 1908 in Uusikaupunki – 25 April 1999 in Helsinki) was the Archbishop of Turku, and the spiritual head of the Evangelical Lutheran Church of Finland between 1964 and 1978. Simojoki became the first bishop of the Diocese of Helsinki that was established in 1959.

Simojoki is known for his criticism of Hannu Salama's book Juhannustanssit in 1964, which led to author's conviction for blasphemy.

He is buried in the Hietaniemi Cemetery in Helsinki.

== Notes ==
Titles in Lutheranism
Preceded by Ilmari Salomies	Archbishop of Turku and Finland; 1964 – 1978	Succeeded by Mikko Juva
Preceded by New office	Bishop of Helsinki; 1959 – 1964	Succeeded by Aarre Lauha
Preceded by Ilmari Salomies	Diocese of Mikkeli; 1951 – 1959	Succeeded by Osmo Alaja
