= Matti Repo =

Finnish prelate (born 1959)

The Right Reverend Matti Repo
- Bishop of Tampere
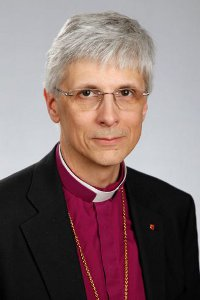
- Church: Evangelical Lutheran Church of Finland
- Diocese: Tampere
- Elected: 26 March 2008
- Predecessor: Juha Pihkala

Orders
- Ordination: 1985
- Consecration: 2008 by Jukka Paarma

Personal details
- Born: 7 March 1959 (age 67) Mikkeli, Finland
- Spouse: Päivi Repo
- Children: 4
- Education: University of Helsinki

Matti Tauno Antero Repo (born 7 March 1959) is a Finnish prelate who has been bishop of the Diocese of Tampere since 2008.

== Biography ==
Repo was born in Mikkeli on 7 March 1959. He was ordained a priest in 1985 and served as a pastor of the parish of Tampere between 1985–2002. He graduated with a Licentiate of Theology in 1992 with his doctoral thesis titled Uskon lahja vai rakkauden päämäärä? meaning The gift of Faith or the purpose of love? He also studied Johann Arndt's idea of justification and union at the University of Helsinki in 1997. He became secretary of the Theological Affairs Department of the Foreign Affairs Department of the Church Administration in 2002. He was elected bishop on 26 March 2008.

Repo is married and has four children.

Religious titles
Preceded by Juha Pihkala	Bishop of Tampere; 2008 –	Incumbent
