= Björn Vikström =

Finnish Lutheran bishop

The Right Reverend Björn Vikström
- Bishop of Borgå
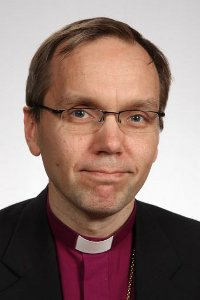
- Church: Evangelical Lutheran Church of Finland
- Diocese: Borgå
- Elected: 2009
- In office: 2009–2019
- Predecessor: Gustav Björkstrand
- Successor: Bo-Göran Åstrand

Orders
- Ordination: 1988
- Consecration: 29 November 2009 by Jukka Paarma

Personal details
- Born: 17 July 1963 (age 63) Turku, Finland
- Education: Åbo Akademi University

Björn Håkan Vikström (born 17 July 1963) is a Finnish prelate who served as Bishop of Borgå between 2009 and 2019.

== Biography ==
Vikström was born on 17 July 1963 in Turku, Finland. He was ordained a priest in 1988, after which he has served as a pastor in Hanko and in the Matteus Church of Helsinki, as well as a chaplain for 15 years in the parish of Kimito and Västanfjärd. He acquired his doctorate in theology in 2000 from Åbo Akademi University.

== Bishop ==
The election for the new Bishop of Borgå was characterized as a competition between the Conservatives and the Liberals, where the Liberals were clearly victorious. Vikström's liberal Bible-mindedness was an old problem, and the discussion particularly concerned his acceptance of homosexual persons. Vikström's positive stance towards homosexuality raised resistance especially in the Swedish-speaking Ostrobothnia, where, according to one view, "many do not experience Vikström as a spiritual leader." Nonetheless, he won the 2009 bishop's election in the second round against Sixten Ekstrand in 250-199 votes. Vikström was ordained a bishop on 29 November 2009. He is the seventh bishop of the Diocese of Porvoo. Vikström was nominated for Archbishop of Turku in 2018, but lost to Tapio Luoma.
