= Eelis Gulin =

The Right Reverend Eelis GulIn
- Bishop of Tampere
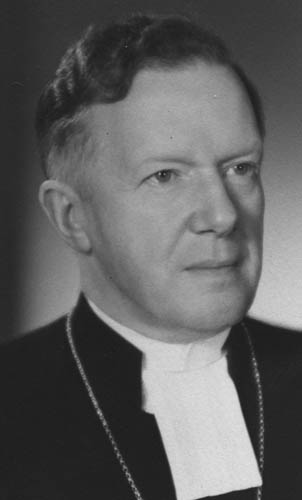
- Church: Evangelical Lutheran Church of Finland
- Diocese: Tampere
- Elected: 1945
- In office: 1945–1966
- Predecessor: Aleksi Lehtonen
- Successor: Erkki Kansanaho

Orders
- Ordination: January 1920
- Consecration: 2 September 1945 by Aleksi Lehtonen

Personal details
- Born: 29 December 1893 Mikkeli, Grand Duchy of Finland, Russian Empire
- Died: 4 August 1975 (aged 81) Helsinki, Finland
- Denomination: Lutheran
- Spouse: Helmi Forsman; Irene Smirnoff

Eelis Gideon Gulin also known as Pinomaa or Gulin-Pinomaa (29 December 1893 - 4 August 1975) was Professor of New Testament at the University of Helsinki from 1933 to 1945 and Bishop of Tampere from 1945 to 1966.

== Biography ==
Gulin was born on 29 December 1893 in Mikkeli, Grand Duchy of Finland in the Russian Empire, the son of Arthur Lorenz Pinomaa Gulin and Bertha Kristina Christina Sarlin. In 1915 he graduated with a bachelor's degree and commenced studies in Eastern languages, Greek, Latin and theoretical philosophy, after which he intended to begin researching the Old Testament. In 1918 he graduated in theology and earned a bachelor's degree one year later. He was ordained priest in January 1920. That same year he married Helmi Forsman. After spending time as a parish priest he became and Assistant Professor of Biblical Languages at the University of Helsinki in 1927. In 1930 he became Professor of scripture at the University of Tartu, where he stayed until 1933 when he became Professor of New Testament at the University of Helsinki. Gulin was also involved in ecumenical work, especially in 1934 when he was involved in the negotiations with the Church of England to establish full communion.

He was appointed Bishop of Tampere in the summer of 1945 and was consecrated by his predecessor in Tampere, the then Archbishop Aleksi Lehtonen in Tampere Cathedral. Through Lehtonen's consecration of Gulin, the historic apostolic succession was retained in the Finnish church, since Lehtonen was consecrated in 1934 by the Archbishop of Uppsala, among others. In turn, Gulin was one of the bishops who consecrated Martti Simojoki in 1951, who later became Archbishop of Turku. Hence the apostolic succession was further disseminated in the Evangelical Lutheran Church of Finland. Gulin retired in 1966 and died on 4 August 1975. On 30 June 1963, Eelis Gulin consecrated as a bishop Leonard Auala of the Evangelical Lutheran Owambo-Kavango Church, incorporating the Evangelical Lutheran Owambo-Kavango Church into the Swedish–Finnish line of apostolic succession.

Religious titles
Preceded by Aleksi Lehtonen	Bishop of Tampere; 1945 – 1966	Succeeded by Erkki Kansanaho
