= Yngve Brilioth =

Swedish theologian (1891–1959)

The Most Reverend Yngve Brilioth
- Archbishop of Uppsala; Primate of Sweden
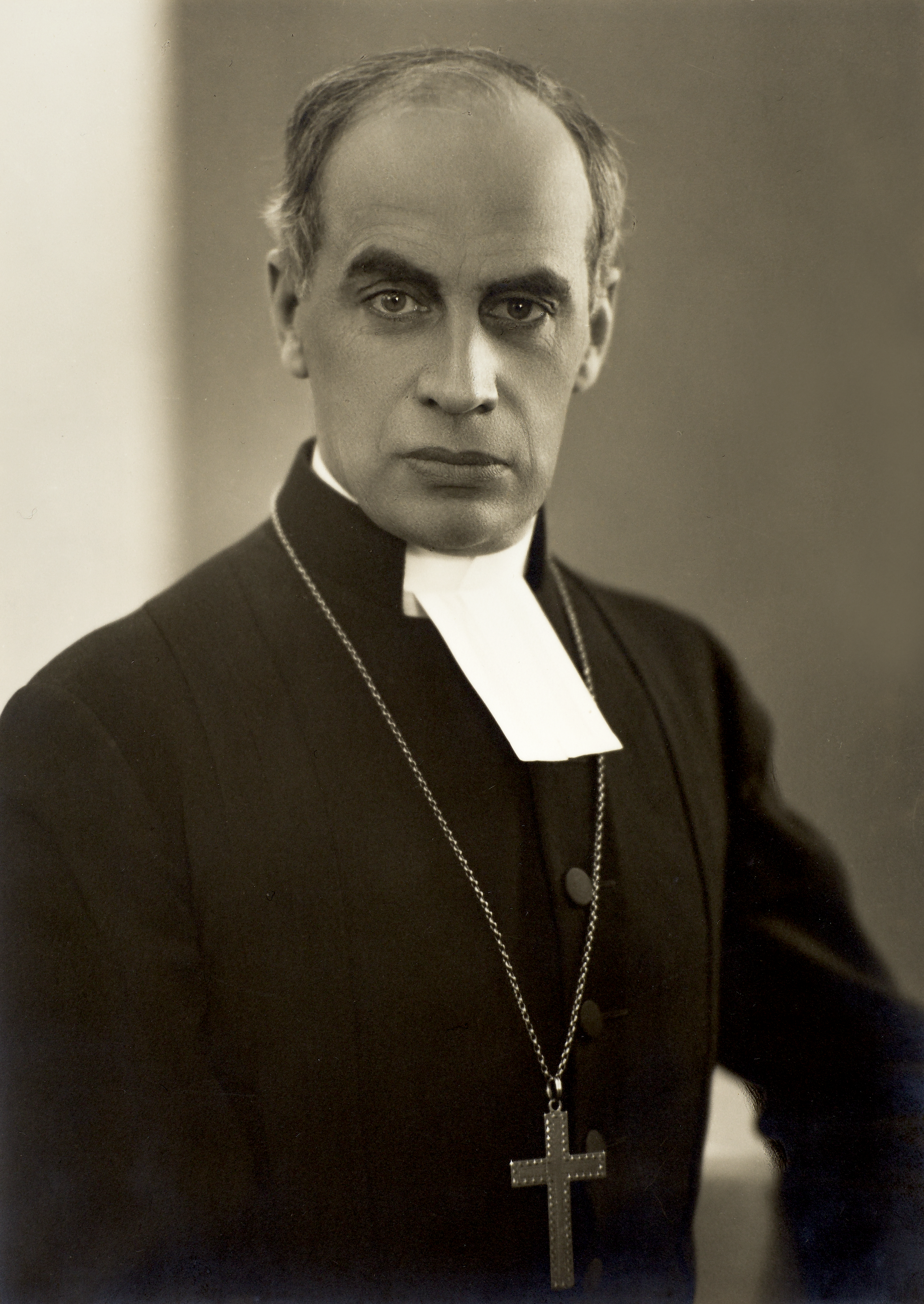
- Church: Church of Sweden
- Archdiocese: Archdiocese of Uppsala
- In office: 1950–1958
- Predecessor: Erling Eidem
- Successor: Gunnar Hultgren
- Previous post: Bishop of Växjö (1938-1950)

Orders
- Ordination: 1918
- Consecration: 1938 by Erling Eidem

Personal details
- Born: 12 July 1891 Västervik, Sweden
- Died: 27 April 1959 (aged 67) Uppsala, Sweden
- Buried: Uppsala old cemetery
- Spouse: Brita Söderblom
- Coat of arms: Yngve Brilioth's coat of arms

Yngve Torgny Brilioth (12 July 1891 – 27 April 1959) was a Swedish theologian, professor for church history and author who served as Bishop of Växjö from 1938 to 1950 and Archbishop of Uppsala from 1950 until 1958.

== Biography ==
He earned his Ph.D. in 1915 and his Dr. theol. in 1917 both from Uppsala University. He was ordained a priest in 1918. He became professor of church history at Åbo Akademi University in Turku, Finland in 1925. In 1928, he became professor of practical theology and clergy in Lund University. Brilioth was awarded honorary doctor of theology at Uppsala in 1927, at the Academy of Turku in 1934, at Oxford University in 1933 and at Glasgow University in 1935.

He wrote many historical and theological books. For his contribution to the history of the Anglican Church, in 1942 he was awarded the Lambeth Cross, the highest award in the Anglican Church. He used his deep historical knowledge when he was archbishop to take measures concerning the organisation, liturgy and methods of preaching; he furthermore had an international interest and was chairman of the Faith and Order commission. He was the author of a history of the Oxford Movement, written to coincide with its centenary in 1933.

== Personal life ==
In 1919, he married Brita Söderblom (1896–1989 the daughter of Nathan Söderblom. He died during 1959 and was buried at Uppsala old cemetery.

== Selected bibliography ==
- Eucharistic Faith and Practise. Evangelical and Catholic. London 1930.
- Evangelicalism and the Oxford Movement. Oxford: Oxford Univ. Press, 1934.
- A brief history of preaching. Philadelphia: Fortress Press, 1965.
- Landmarks in the history of preaching. London: S.P.C.K., 1950.
- Sven-Erik Brodd: The Church as Sacrament in the Writings of Yngve Brilioth. In: International journal for the Study of the Christian Church 9, 2009, S. 118-137

== Other sources ==
- Bexell, Oloph (1997) Yngve Brilioth - historiker, teolog, kyrkoledare. Texter, studier och minnen samlade och utgivna (Växjö stiftshistoriska sällska) ISBN 91 7580 159-0

== Related reading ==
- Yngve Brilioth (1925) The Anglican Revival: Studies in the Oxford Movement, Volume 51; Volume 340 (London: Longmans, Green and Co.)

Preceded by Erling Eidem	Archbishop of Uppsala; Primate of Sweden; 1950–1958	Succeeded by Gunnar Hultgren
