= Chancellor of Uppsala University =

Head of the University of Uppsala from 1622 to 1893

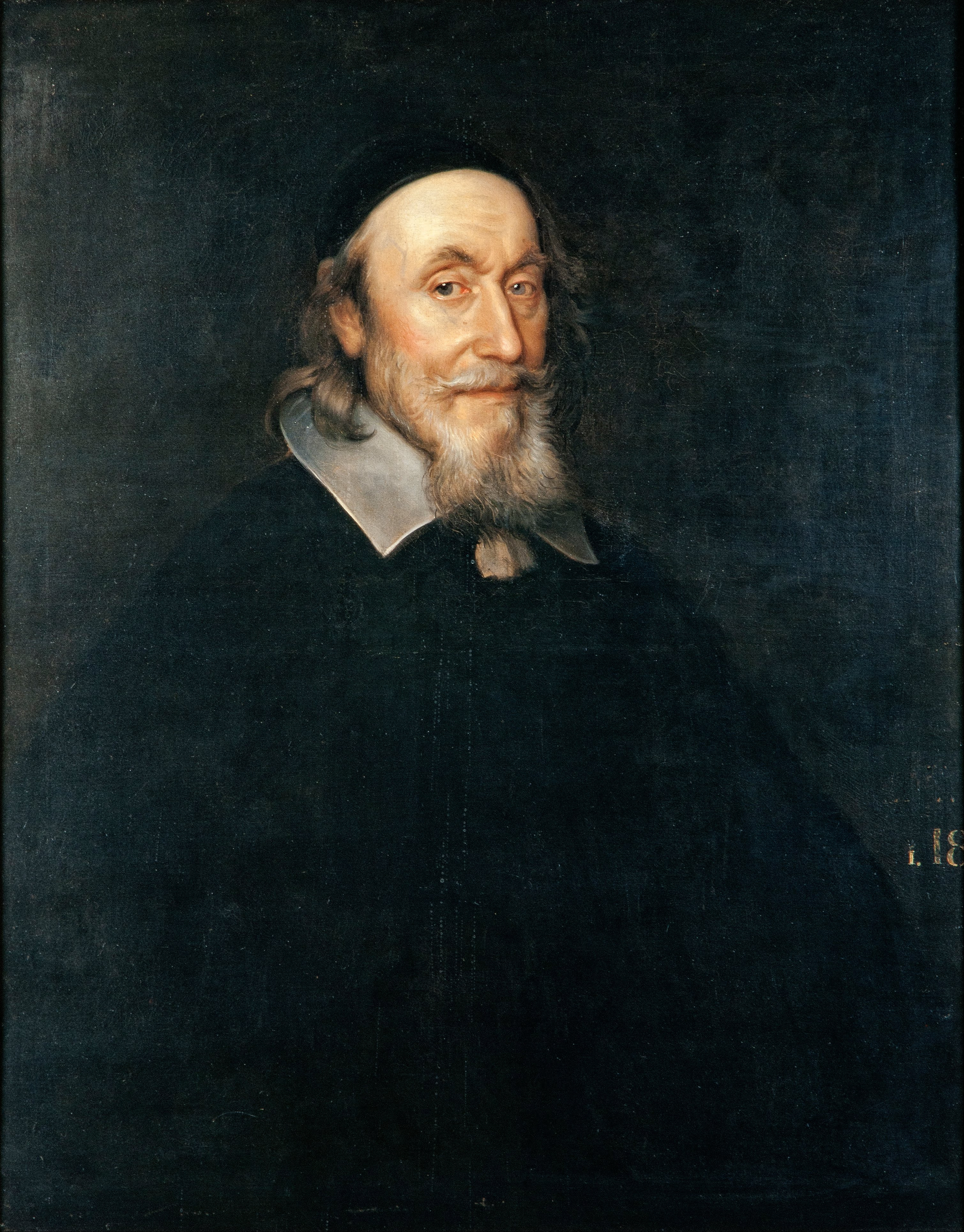
Axel Oxenstierna, Lord High Chancellor of Sweden, was also Chancellor of Uppsala University from 1646 until his death in 1654.

The Chancellor (Swedish: kansler) of Uppsala University was from 1622 to 1893 the head of the University of Uppsala, although in most academic and practical day-to-day matters it was run by the consistory (konsistorium) or board, and its chairman, the Rector magnificus.

== History ==
There appears to have been a position as chancellor of the university already in its earliest period. According to the papal bull of Sixtus IV from 1477, the Archbishop of Uppsala, Jakob Ulfsson (the initiator of the university), was to be chancellor of the university. His successors appear not to have held this position, and during the 16th century and its long periods of dormancy of the university, no chancellor seems to have been appointed.

According to the privileges for Uppsala University promulgated by the regent Duke Charles (later king Charles IX) in 1595, the archbishop of Uppsala, the other bishops of the realm and the university were to elect the chancellor, who was then to be confirmed in his position by the king. In 1604 the university requested Prince Gustavus Adolphus as chancellor but received the reply that the Duke was still too young to understand these matters. In 1607 Count Abraham Brahe was appointed chancellor, but does not seem to have given much attention to the university, in contrast to the king's former tutor, the learned Johan Skytte, still remembered (among other things) for his donation of the Skyttean professorship, who was appointed chancellor in 1622 and can be said to begin the continuous chronological list of chancellors. Skytte was a member of the council of state (riksrådet) and the king ordered in 1625 that one of the councillors of state (riksråd) was always to hold the position of chancellor. The position of Pro-Chancellor (prokansler), deputy of the Chancellor, was always held ex officio by the Archbishop of Uppsala.

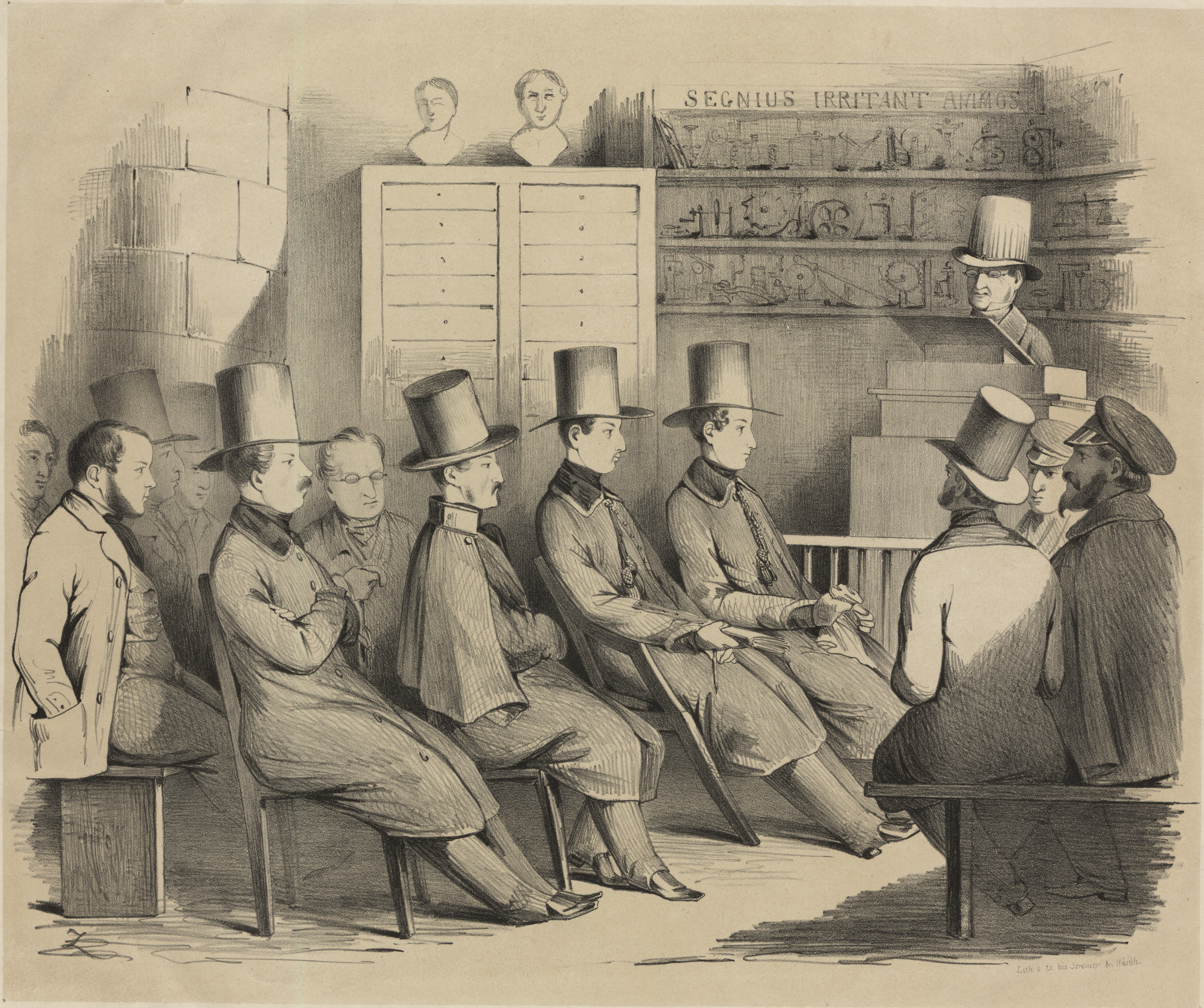
Crown Prince Carl (the later king Charles XV) and his brother Prince Gustaf, known as a song composer (the two young men closest to the pulpit), attending a lecture held by Law Professor Johan Christopher Lindblad (1799-1876) in the Theatrum Œconomicum, Uppsala. (Lithograph from 1846.)

From the latter half of the 18th century until 1859 the position of chancellor was more often than not held by members of the royal family. For instance, Crown Prince Carl Johan, the former French Marshal Jean Baptiste Bernadotte and later king Charles XIV of Sweden, held the position from his election as heir to the throne and adoption by king Charles XIII. On his accession to the throne in 1818, his French-born son, Crown Prince Oscar (later Oscar I of Sweden), succeeded his father in the position, as did his son, Crown Prince Carl, when Oscar became king in 1844. Carl (the later Charles XV of Sweden) belonged to the first Swedish-born generation of the Bernadotte dynasty, and he and his brothers were also the first members of any Swedish royal dynasty to attend university since Charles X, who had been matriculated in Uppsala somewhat over 200 years earlier (1638). Carl was in fact chancellor already while he was himself a student at the university, and he remained so until his accession to the throne in 1859.

From 1861 the Chancellor of Uppsala University was also head of the Karolinska Institute (founded in 1810), and from 1859 until 1893 the Chancellorship of Uppsala University was always held by the same person as the Chancellorship of Lund University; from June 17, 1893, the positions were combined into a single one, with the new University Chancellor having responsibility both for the two old universities and for the then recently founded university colleges of Stockholm and Gothenburg (now the universities of Stockholm and Gothenburg).

The role of the chancellor and his level of interference in university affairs depended on the aspirations or visions of the person holding the position and varied over time. With the new national university chancellor getting a supervisory role in relation to higher education as a whole from 1893, the local leadership role of the rector magnificus grew from the end of the 19th century and the terms of the rectors of the university lengthened from the one or two semesters at a time which had previously been the rule to several years or even a decade or two.

The position of Pro-Chancellor was abolished in 1934, but the last incumbent, Archbishop Erling Eidem retained it until his retirement in 1950.

== Chancellors of the University of Uppsala ==
Years	Chancellor
1622–1645	Baron Johan Skytte
1646–1654	Count Axel Oxenstierna
1654–1686	Count Magnus Gabriel De la Gardie
1686–1702	Count Bengt Gabrielsson Oxenstierna
1702–1716	Count Carl Piper
1719	Count Arvid Horn (elected 1716 but received his Letter of calling only on February 21, 1719, and remained chancellor until April 9, 1719)
1719–1737	Count Gustaf Cronhielm
1737	Count Olof Törnflycht, chancellor July 27 – September 22, 1737
1737–1739	Count Gustaf Bonde
1739–1746	Count Carl Gyllenborg
1747–1751	Prince Adolphus Frederick (the later King Adolphus Frederick)
1751–1760	Count Carl Didrik Ehrenpreus
1760–1764	Count Anders Johan von Höpken
1785–1771	Crown Prince Gustavus (the later King Gustavus III)
1771–1783	Count Carl Rudenschöld
1783–1785	Count Gustaf Philip Creutz
1785–1792	Crown Prince Gustavus Adolphus (the later King Gustavus IV Adolphus)
1792–1796	Prince Charles, Duke of Södermanland (the later King Charles XIII)
1796–1799	King Gustavus IV Adolphus
1799–1810	Count Axel von Fersen
1810–	Crown Prince Charles John of Sweden (the former Marshal Jean Baptiste Bernadotte, and later King Charles XIV)
1818–1844	Crown Prince Oscar (the future king Oscar I)
1844–1859	Crown Prince Charles (later king Charles XV)

== Chancellors of the Universities of Uppsala and Lund ==
Years	Chancellor
1859–1871	Count Gustaf Adolf Vive Sparre
1872–1881	Count Henning Hamilton
1881–1888	Baron Louis Gerhard De Geer
1888–1898	Pehr Jacob Ehrenheim. He was, from June 17, 1893, the first holder of the position of Swedish University Chancellor.
