= Purmo =

- Former municipality
- Purmo kommun Purmon kunta
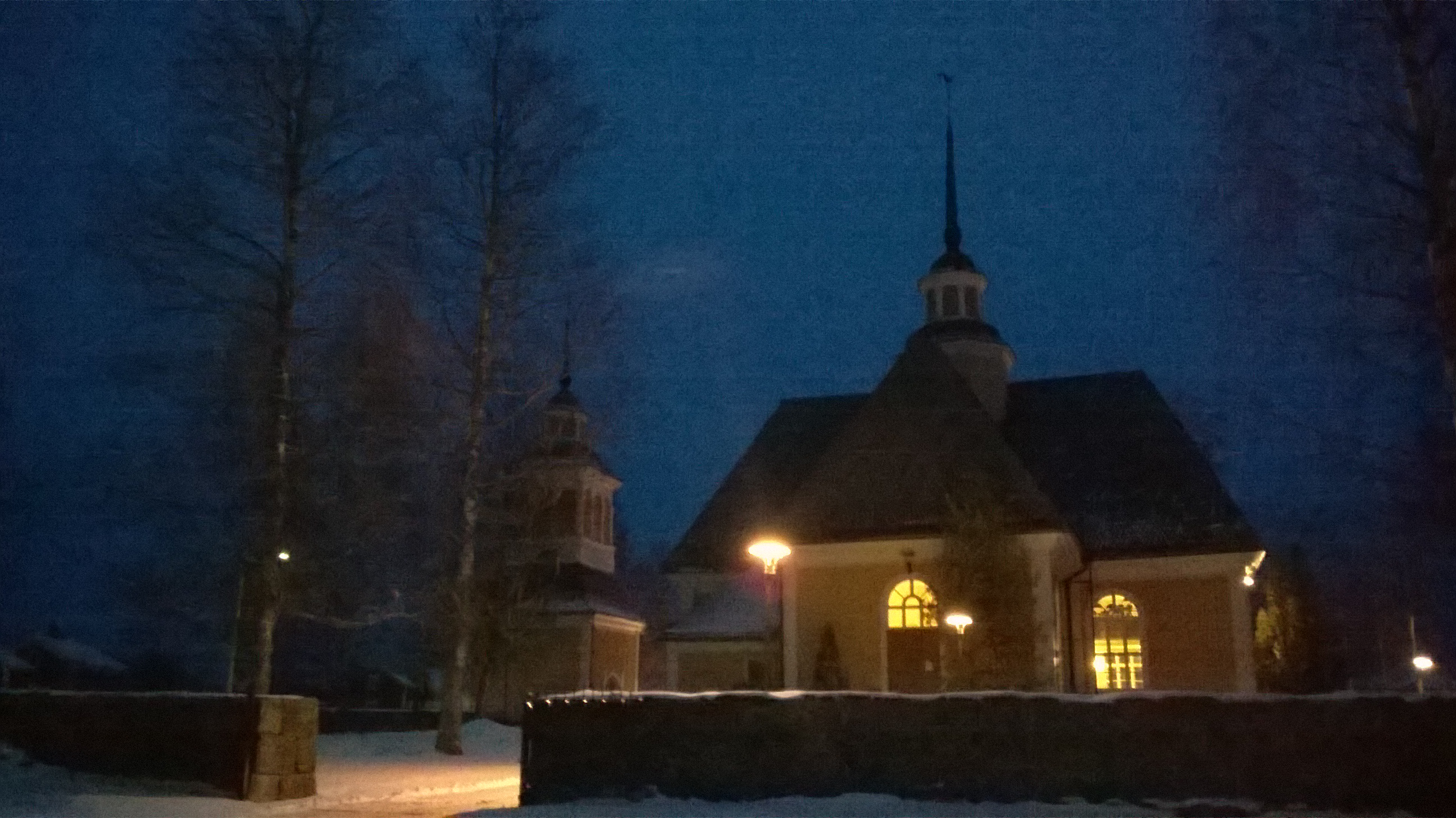
- Wooden church of Purmo

- Coat of arms

- Location of Purmo in Finland
- Coordinates: 63.522194°N 22.959333°E
- Country: Finland
- Province: Vaasa Province
- Region: Ostrobothnia
- Established: 1867
- Merged into Pedersöre: 1977
- Seat: Lillby

Area
  - Land: 261.4 km^{2} (100.9 sq mi)

Population (1976-12-31)
  - Total: 1,560

Purmo is a former municipality of Finland. It was incorporated into the rural municipality of Pedersöre (currently the municipality of Pedersöre) in Ostrobothnia in 1977. Purmo is home to a wooden church built by Antti Hakola in 1772. Approximately 1,400 people live in Purmo and like in Pedersöre, they are mainly Swedish-speaking.

The Purmo Group, a manufacturing firm, was founded in Purmo in 1953.

== Villages ==
- Nederpurmo
- Purmojärvi
- Överpurmo
- Lillby

== Name ==
According to Lars Huldén, the name of Purmo may come from the Finnish words puro (stream) and maa (land) or from a North Karelian surname, Purmonen. Other possibilities include a common origin with Purmoniemi, a peninsula in Evijärvi and Purmonsaari, a hill in Lappajärvi; as well as a relation to the South Ostrobothnian dialectal word purmu referring to a pit for storing beets during the winter.

== History ==
Purmo was first mentioned as a village within the Pedersöre parish in 1543. It became a chapel community in 1771 and an independent parish and municipality in 1867.

Purmo was merged back into Pedersöre in 1977.
