= Erling Eidem =

Swedish theologian

The Most Reverend Erling Eidem LoKavKMO
- Archbishop of Uppsala; Primate of Sweden
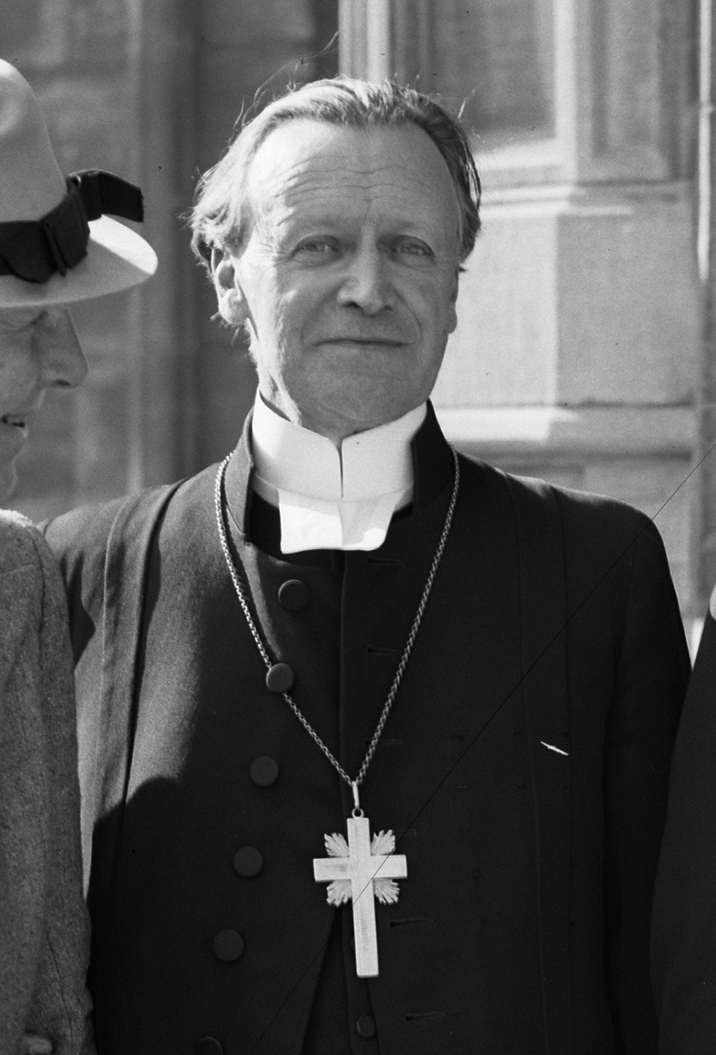
- Eidem in 1945
- Church: Church of Sweden
- Archdiocese: Uppsala
- Elected: 1931
- In office: 1931–1950
- Predecessor: Nathan Söderblom
- Successor: Yngve Brilioth

Orders
- Ordination: 8 January 1914
- Consecration: 22 May 1932 by Olof Bergqvist

Personal details
- Born: 23 April 1880 Gothenburg, Sweden
- Died: 14 April 1972 (aged 91) Vänersborg, Sweden
- Buried: Uppsala old cemetery
- Spouse: Elisabeth Eklund
- Motto: Quasi morientes et ecce uiuimus
- Coat of arms

Erling Eidem (23 April 1880 – 14 April 1972) was a Swedish theologian who served as archbishop of Uppsala 1931–1950.

Eidem was son of Anders Magnus Andersson, a merchant in Gothenburg, and his spouse Pauline Eidem, whose maiden name he took. He received his filosofie kandidat degree from the University College of Gothenburg in 1903, his theology degree from Lund University in 1907, became licentiate there in 1912 and completed his doctorate of theology in 1918. He was docent of New Testament exegesis in Lund 1913-1924, and was assistant at Uppsala University 1918-1919. He was vicar of Gårdstånga parish 1924-1928 and professor of Biblical studies in Uppsala 1926-1928, and in Lund from 1928 until 1931, when he was elected archbishop of Uppsala. He married Elisabeth Eklund, a daughter of the theologian Pehr Eklund, dean of the cathedral of Lund and professor of church history at the university.

During the 1930s, Eidem expressed nationalist views, but kept a clear distance from the German Nazi regime and warned the Lutheran church in Germany for the prevalent antisemitism. After the war years, Eidem was one of the churchmen who donated money to the high church St. Ansgar Foundation in Uppsala.

Following the murder of Kaj Munk on 4 January 1944 the Danish resistance newspaper De frie Danske brought condemning reactions from influential Scandinavians, including Eidem.

Eidem was the last archbishop to be ex officio Pro-Chancellor of Uppsala University.

Preceded by Nathan Söderblom	Archbishop of Uppsala; Primate of Sweden; 1931–1950	Succeeded by Yngve Brilioth
