= Diocese of Mikkeli =

Diocese of Mikkeli Mikkelin hiippakunta
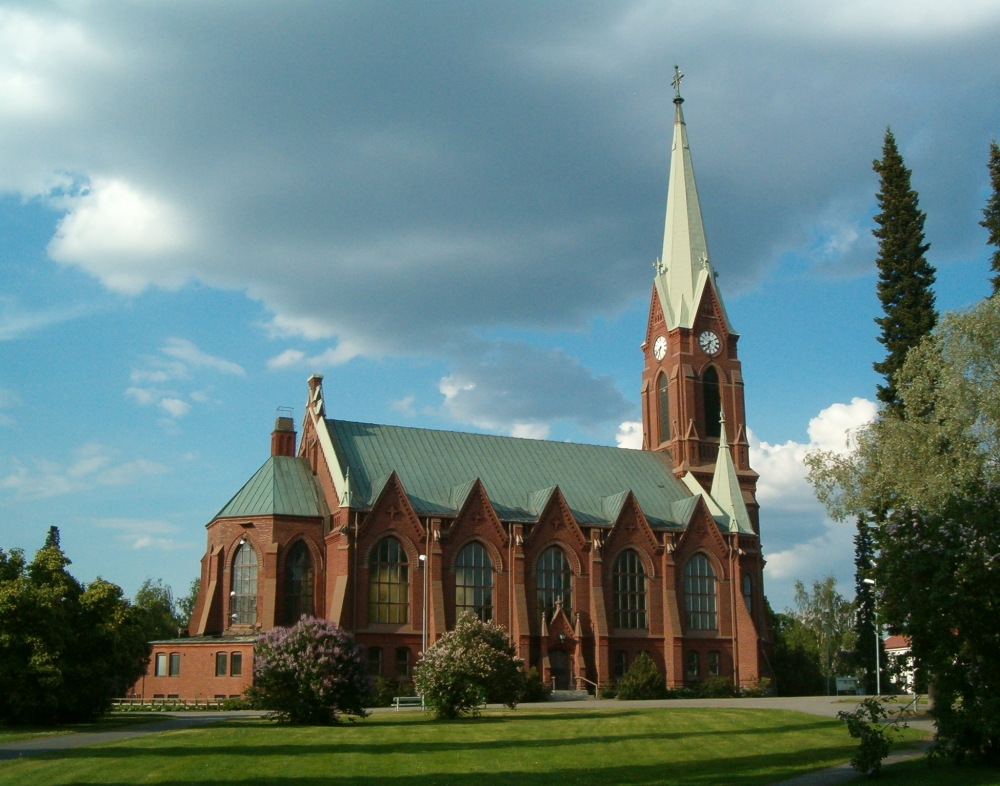

- Coat of arms

Location
- Country: Finland
- Ecclesiastical province: Turku & Finland
- Metropolitan: Archbishop of Turku & Finland

Statistics
- Parishes: 36

Information
- Denomination: Evangelical Lutheran Church of Finland
- Established: 1897
- Cathedral: Mikkeli Cathedral
- Co-cathedral: Savonlinna Cathedral

Current leadership
- Bishop: Mari Parkkinen
- Metropolitan Archbishop: Tapio Luoma

Website
- www.mikkelinhiippakunta.fi

The Diocese of Mikkeli (Finnish: Mikkelin hiippakunta, Swedish: Sankt Michels stift) is one of nine dioceses in the Evangelical Lutheran Church of Finland. It was founded in 1897 in the town of Savonlinna. Later, in 1924 the episcopal see was moved to Viipuri, but after Finland lost the city to the Soviet Union, the see was moved to Mikkeli in 1945. It has since been located there.

== Bishops of Mikkeli ==
- Bishops of Savonlinna 1897–1924
  - Gustaf Johansson 1897–1899
  - Otto Immanuel Colliander 1899–1924
- Bishops of Viipuri 1924–1945
  - Erkki Kaila 1925–1935
  - Yrjö Loimaranta 1935–1942
  - Ilmari Salomies 1943–1945
- Bishops of Mikkeli 1945–
  - Ilmari Salomies 1945–1951
  - Martti Simojoki 1951–1959
  - Osmo Alaja 1959–1978
  - Kalevi Toiviainen 1978–1993
  - Voitto Huotari 1993–2009
  - Seppo Häkkinen 2009–2023
  - Mari Parkkinen 2023–

== See also ==
- Evangelical Lutheran Church of Finland
