= Erkki Kaila =

The Most Reverend Erkki Kaila
- Archbishop of Turku and Finland
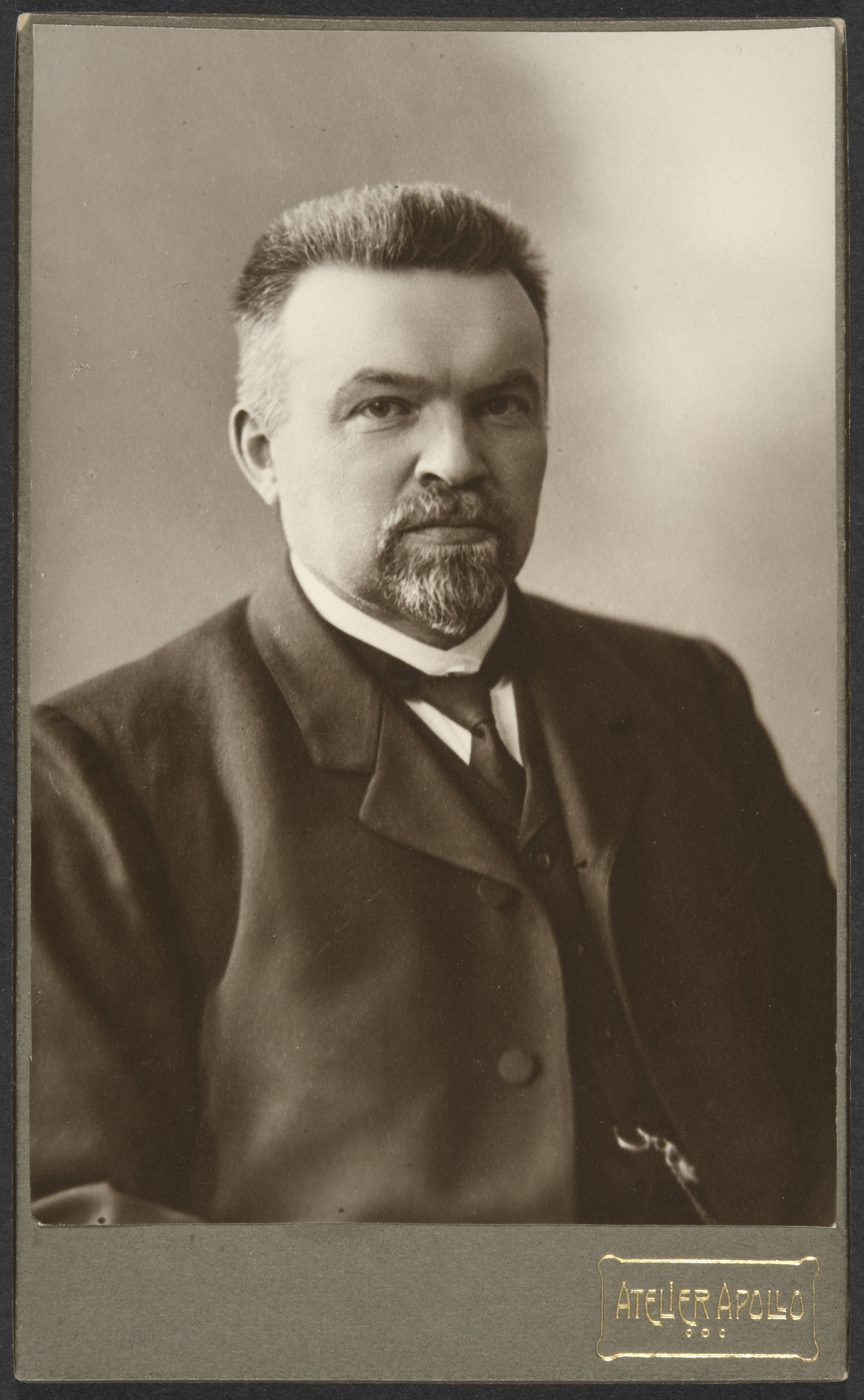
- Church: Evangelical Lutheran Church of Finland
- Archdiocese: Turku
- In office: 1935–1944
- Predecessor: Lauri Ingman
- Successor: Aleksi Lehtonen
- Previous post: Bishop of Viipuri (1925-1935)

Orders
- Ordination: 1889
- Consecration: 1925

Personal details
- Born: 2 June 1867 Huittinen, Grand Duchy of Finland, Russian Empire Present-day Finland
- Died: 9 December 1944 (aged 77) Turku, Finland
- Denomination: Lutheran
- Parents: Jonatan Johansson & Matilda Maria Milbrandt
- Spouse: Aina Maria Drake (1889–1937); Anna-Maria Tallgren (1944)
- Children: 10

Erkki Kaila, previously Erik Johansson (2 June 1867 – 9 December 1944), was the Archbishop of Turku, and the spiritual head of the Evangelical Lutheran Church of Finland between 1935 and 1944. He was a Member of Parliament between 1917 and 1927, representing the Finnish Party from 1917 to 1918 and the National Coalition Party from 1918 to 1927.

Titles in Lutheranism
Preceded by Lauri Ingman	Archbishop of Turku; 1935–1944	Succeeded by Aleksi Lehtonen
