= Diocese of Borgå =

Lutheran diocese in Finland

Diocese of Borgå Borgå stift
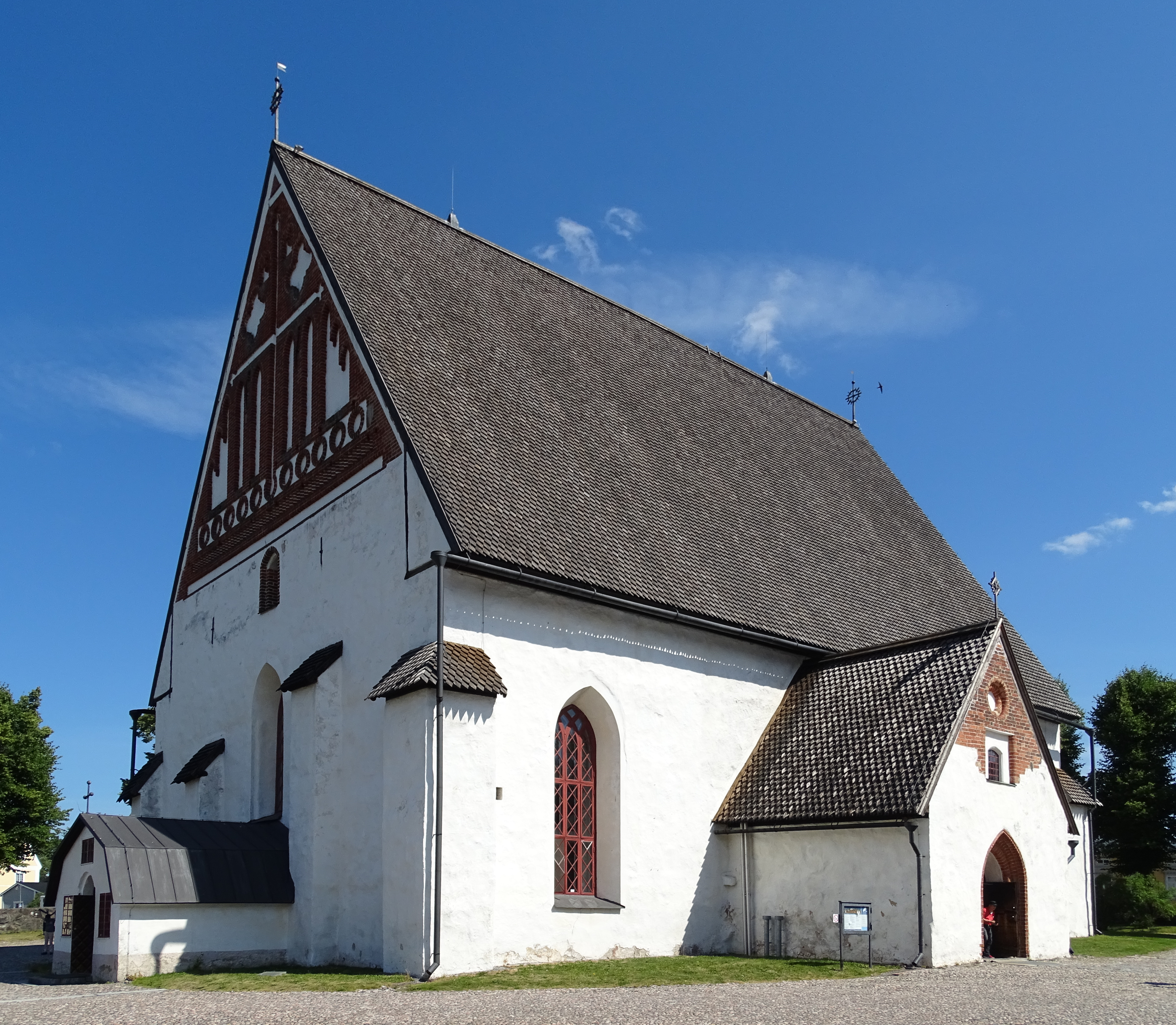
- Borgå Cathedral

- Coat of arms

Location
- Country: Finland
- Ecclesiastical province: Turku & Finland
- Metropolitan: Archbishop of Turku & Finland

Information
- Denomination: Evangelical Lutheran Church of Finland
- Cathedral: Porvoo Cathedral

Current leadership
- Bishop: Bo-Göran Åstrand
- Metropolitan Archbishop: Tapio Luoma

Website
- www.borgastift.fi

The Diocese of Borgå (Swedish: Borgå stift, Finnish: Porvoon hiippakunta) is a diocese for the Swedish-speaking minority of Finland. It is a part of the Evangelical Lutheran Church of Finland. Porvoo (Borgå in Swedish) is also the old seat of the present-day (Finnish-speaking) Diocese of Tampere.

Unlike the other dioceses of the Evangelical Lutheran Church of Finland, the diocese is not formed on a geographical basis. All the Swedish-speaking parishes and dominantly Swedish-speaking bilingual parishes of the church belong to the diocese, regardless of their location. As a result of the geographical distribution of Swedish-speakers, the parishes of the diocese are mostly on the coast, the Swedish-speaking parish of Tampere being the only inland parish. In addition, there are two ethnicity-based parishes in the diocese: The German parish of Finland and rikssvenska Olaus Petri församlingen, the former Church of Sweden parish in Finland. The German parish (German: Deutsche ev.-luth. Gemeinde in Finnland) is the parish for the German-speaking minority of Finland, while the rikssvenska parish consists of Swedish citizens living in Finland.

The diocese has some 234,000 parishioners.

== Bishops of Borgå ==
- Max von Bonsdorff, 1923–1954
- Georg Olof Rosenqvist, 1954–1961
- Karl-Erik Forssell, 1961–1970
- John Vikström, 1970–1982
- Erik Vikström, 1983–2006
- Gustav Björkstrand, 2006–2009
- Björn Vikström 2009–2019
- Bo-Göran Åstrand 2019–

Two of the three bishops Vikström are brothers, John (later archbishop of Turku/Åbo) and Erik, while Björn is a son of John Vikström.

== See also ==
- Porvoo Cathedral
