= Miikka Ruokanen =

Finnish theologian and professor emeritus of dogmatics at the University of Helsinki.

Miikka Ruokanen (Chinese: 罗明嘉, Luo Mingjia; born 11 April 1953) is a Finnish theologian and professor emeritus of dogmatics (the study of doctrine) at the University of Helsinki. He is known for his research on Augustine, Martin Luther, the Second Vatican Council and Gerhard Ebeling.

== Education ==
Ruokanen attended the United World College of the Atlantic in Great Britain, completing his British matriculation in 1972. He earned a Master of Theology (1976), a Licentiate of Theology (1978) and a PhD in systematic theology (1982) from the University of Helsinki. In 2018 he received a PhD in Divinity from the University of Cambridge.

== Career ==
=== Academic career ===
Ruokanen began teaching at the University of Helsinki's Faculty of Theology in 1979, serving as adjunct professor of dogmatics from 1983 to 1993 and as professor from 1993 to 2018. He chaired the Department of Systematic Theology from 2010 to 2013 and served on the Faculty Council at various times between 1998 and 2013. On retiring in 2018, he became professor emeritus. Since 1997, Ruokanen has held academic appointments at Chinese universities, including Renmin University of China, Fudan University, Nankai University and Minzu University of China. He began teaching at Nanjing Union Theological Seminary in 2004 and became a full-time professor there in 2018.

=== Ministry and the Thomas Mass ===
Ruokanen was ordained in the Evangelical Lutheran Church of Finland in 1977 and served as a parish pastor in urban congregations from 1977 to 1982. He helped establish the Thomas Mass (Tuomasmessu), a modern, ecumenical and participatory form of worship designed to welcome people distant from traditional church life. Since 1988 it has been the most popular form of worship in the Finnish national church and has influenced liturgical renewal in Finland, other Nordic countries and Germany.

In 2010, Ruokanen stood for election as Archbishop of Turku and Finland. He reached the second round, in which the final vote was 593–582.

== Research projects ==
Ruokanen has led four research projects, three of them funded by the Academy of Finland. From 1998 to 2000, he directed Gospel and Cultures, a study of contextualization and interreligious dialogue that produced several doctoral dissertations and scholarly articles. Between 2001 and 2003 he oversaw Christianity in the Asian Religious Context, which examined inculturation in China, India and Thailand, with findings published in English and Chinese.

From 2012 to 2016, Ruokanen led RELDIAL: Interreligious Dialogue Promoting Cross-cultural Communication, an interdisciplinary initiative on global ethics and interfaith dialogue, funded by the University of Helsinki. From 2018 to 2022, he directed The Relevance of Religious Values in Modern China, a Sino-Finnish collaboration with the Chinese Academy of Social Sciences and other institutions, focusing on religious values and interfaith dialogue using the method of Scriptural Reasoning. It produced two volumes of research articles, each published in Chinese and English.
