= Diocese of Tampere =

Diocese of the Evangelical Lutheran Church of Finland

Diocese of Tampere Tampereen hiippakunta
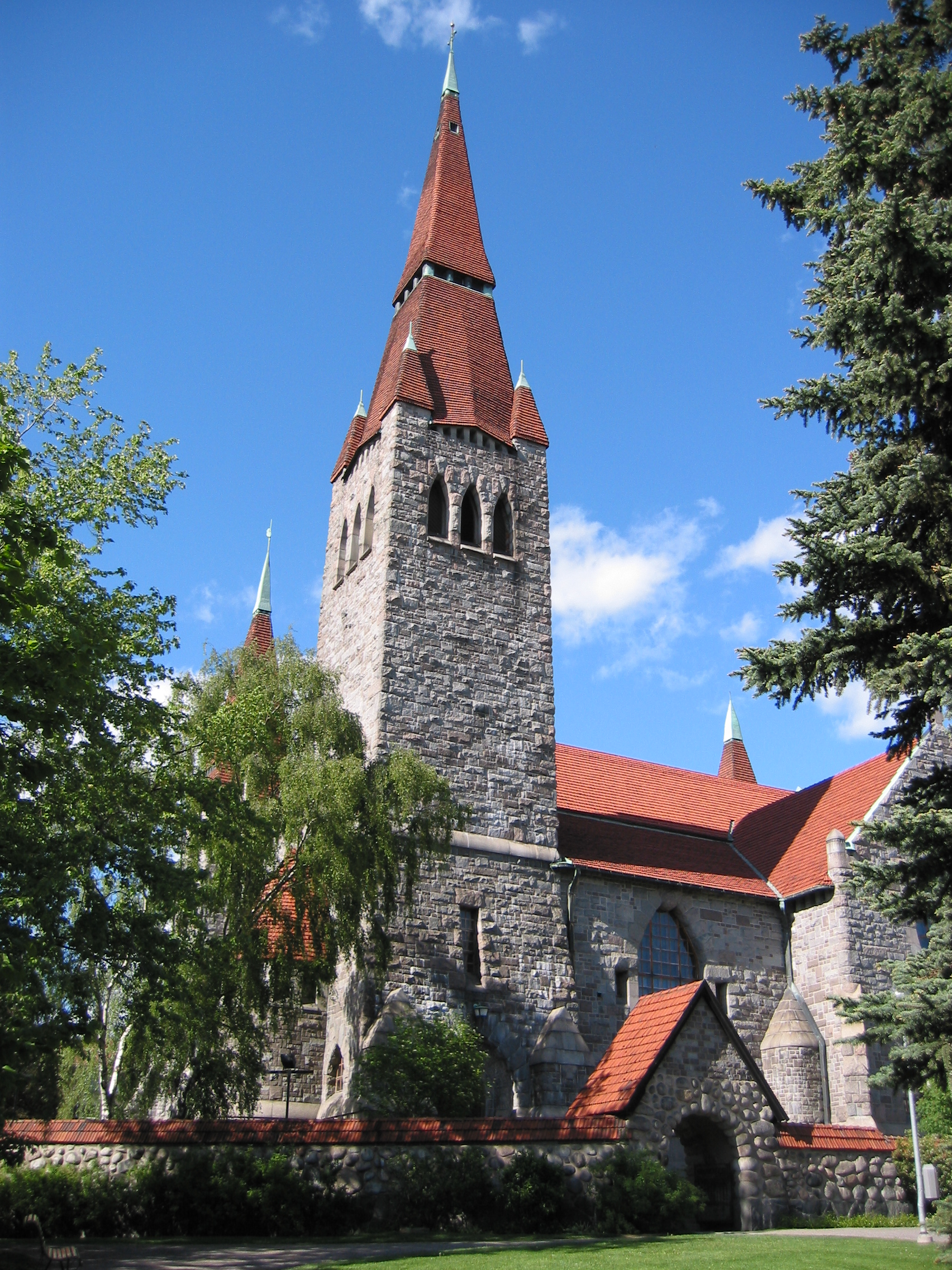

Location
- Country: Finland
- Ecclesiastical province: Turku & Finland
- Metropolitan: Archbishop of Turku & Finland

Statistics
- Parishes: 49
- Members: 595,000

Information
- Denomination: Evangelical Lutheran Church of Finland
- Established: 1554
- Cathedral: Tampere Cathedral

Current leadership
- Bishop: Matti Repo
- Metropolitan Archbishop: Tapio Luoma

Website
- www.tampereenhiippakunta.fi

The Diocese of Tampere (Finnish: Tampereen hiippakunta, Swedish: Tammerfors stift) is the second-oldest and largest diocese in the Evangelical Lutheran Church of Finland. It was originally founded in 1554 as the Diocese of Viipuri (Viborg), but moved to Porvoo in 1723, becoming the Diocese of Porvoo (Borgå). In 1923, the diocese was relocated to Tampere. Its seat is Tampere Cathedral. The diocese comprises 69 parishes, serving a total population of over 595,000 people. It is led by the Bishop of Tampere.

== History ==
The history of the diocese goes back over 450 years. It was founded in 1554, when King Gustav Vasa divided the Diocese of Turku, which had covered the entire Finland, into two parts. The new diocese was initially established in Viipuri (Vyborg), with Paulus Juusten serving as its first bishop. After the Russian occupation of Viipuri in 1723, the bishop's seat was moved to Porvoo (Borgå). However, with the establishment of a new Swedish-language Diocese of Borgå in 1923, Finland's second oldest diocese was relocated to Tampere, where it became known as the Diocese of Tampere.

== Tampere Cathedral ==
The seat of the diocese is Tampere Cathedral. The cathedral is open daily, though with limited hours. In the upper part of the cathedral is The Wounded Angel, a painting by Hugo Simberg.

== Bishop of Tampere ==
The Bishop of Tampere is the leader of the Diocese of Tampere. As of 2024, the bishop is the Right Reverend Matti Repo.

=== Bishops of Viipuri ===
List of bishops of Viipuri from 1554 to 1711:

- Paulus Juusten 1554–1563
- Canutus Johannis 1563–1564
- Eerik Härkäpää 1568–1578
- Olaus Elimaeus 1618–1629
- Nicolaus Magni Carelius 1630–1632
- Gabriel Melartopaeus 1633–1641
- Petrus Bjugg 1642–1656
- Nicolaus Nycopensis 1658–1664
- Petrus Brommius 1664–1672
- Abraham Thauvonius 1672–1679
- Henrik Carstenius 1679–1683
- Petrus Bång 1681–1696
- Petrus Laurbecchius 1696–1705
- David Lund 1705–1711

Russian invasion of Finland

=== Bishops of Porvoo ===
List of bishops of Porvoo from 1721 to 1923:

- Johannes Gezelius the youngest 1721–1733
- Daniel Juslenius 1734–1743
- Johan Nylander 1745–1761
- Gabriel Fortunius 1762–1789
- Paul Krogius 1789–1792
- Zacharias Cygnaeus 1792–1809
- Magnus Jacob Alopaeus 1809–1818
- Zacharias Cygnaeus the younger 1819–1820
- Johan Molander 1821–1837
- Carl Gustaf Ottelin 1838–1864
- Frans Ludvig Schauman 1865–1878
- Anders Johan Hornborg 1878–1883
- Johan Viktor Johnsson 1884
- Carl Henrik Alopaeus 1885–1892
- Herman Råbergh 1892–1920
- Jaakko Gummerus 1920–1923

=== Bishops of Tampere ===
List of bishops of Tampere from 1923 to the present:

- Jaakko Gummerus 1923–1933
- Aleksi Lehtonen 1934–1945
- Eelis Gulin 1945–1966
- Erkki Kansanaho 1966–1981
- Paavo Kortekangas 1981–1996
- Juha Pihkala 1996–2008
- Matti Repo 2008–

== See also ==
- Tampere Cathedral
