= Max von Bonsdorff =

Finnish priest (1882–1967)

The Right Reverend Max von Bonsdorff D.D.
- Bishop of Borgå
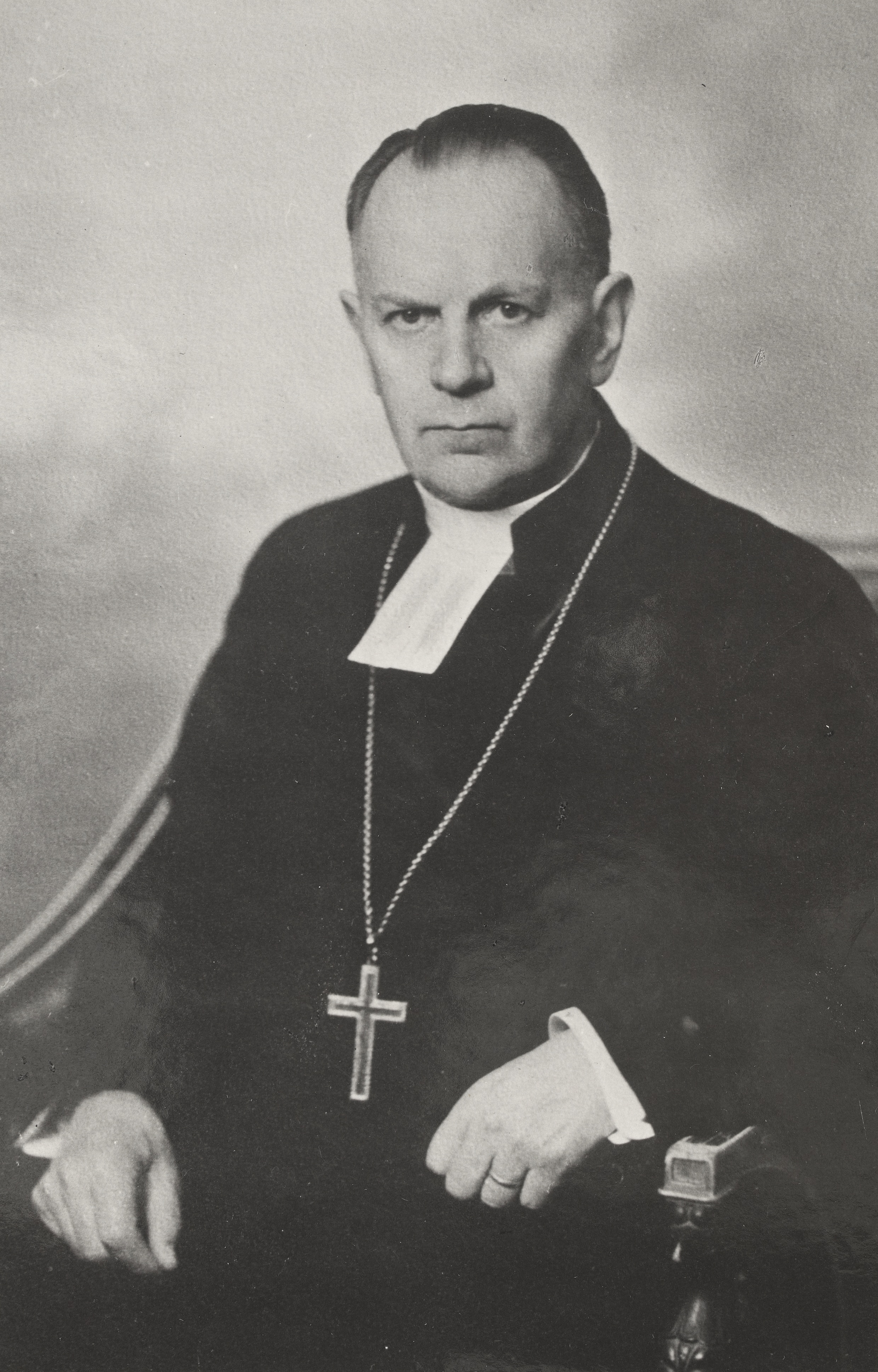
- Church: Evangelical Lutheran Church of Finland
- Diocese: Borgå
- Elected: 28 September 1923
- In office: 1923–1954
- Successor: Georg Olof Rosenqvist

Orders
- Ordination: 1910
- Consecration: 25 November 1923 by Gustaf Johansson

Personal details
- Born: 23 August 1882 Turku, Grand Duchy of Finland, Russian Empire
- Died: 12 February 1967 (aged 84) Porvoo, Finland
- Denomination: Lutheran
- Education: University of Helsinki

Max Oskar von Bonsdorff (23 August 1882 – 12 February 1967) was a Finnish prelate who became the first Bishop of Borgå in Finland in 1923.

== Early life and career ==
Max von Bonsdorff was born on 23 August 1882 in Turku, Grand Duchy of Finland in the Russian Empire, the son of Alfred Oskar von Bonsdorff and Aina Augusta Ahlstedt. His family were part of the Finnish and Swedish lower nobility. He was ordained priest in 1910 and undertook a doctoral degree at the University of Helsinki in 1923. Prior to his time as a bishop, he was a lecturer in Vyborg and Turku. He also served as a vicar to the Swedish congregation in Helsinki between 1921 and 1923.

== Bishop ==
In 1923 the Diocese of Borgå or Porvoo in Finnish, was created to serve the Swedish population in Finland and he was elected as its first bishop. He was consecrated on 25 November 1923 and installed as the first bishop on 1 December.

== Written works ==
Some of von Bonsdorff's writings include:

- Zur Predigttätigkeit des Johannes Chrysostomus (1922, väitöskirja)
- Motsatser i kristendomslivet (1924)
- Herman Råbergh (1957)
