= Mikko Juva =

Finnish historian, theologian & Lutheran archbishop (1918–2004)

The Most Reverend Mikko Juva
- Archbishop of Turku and Finland
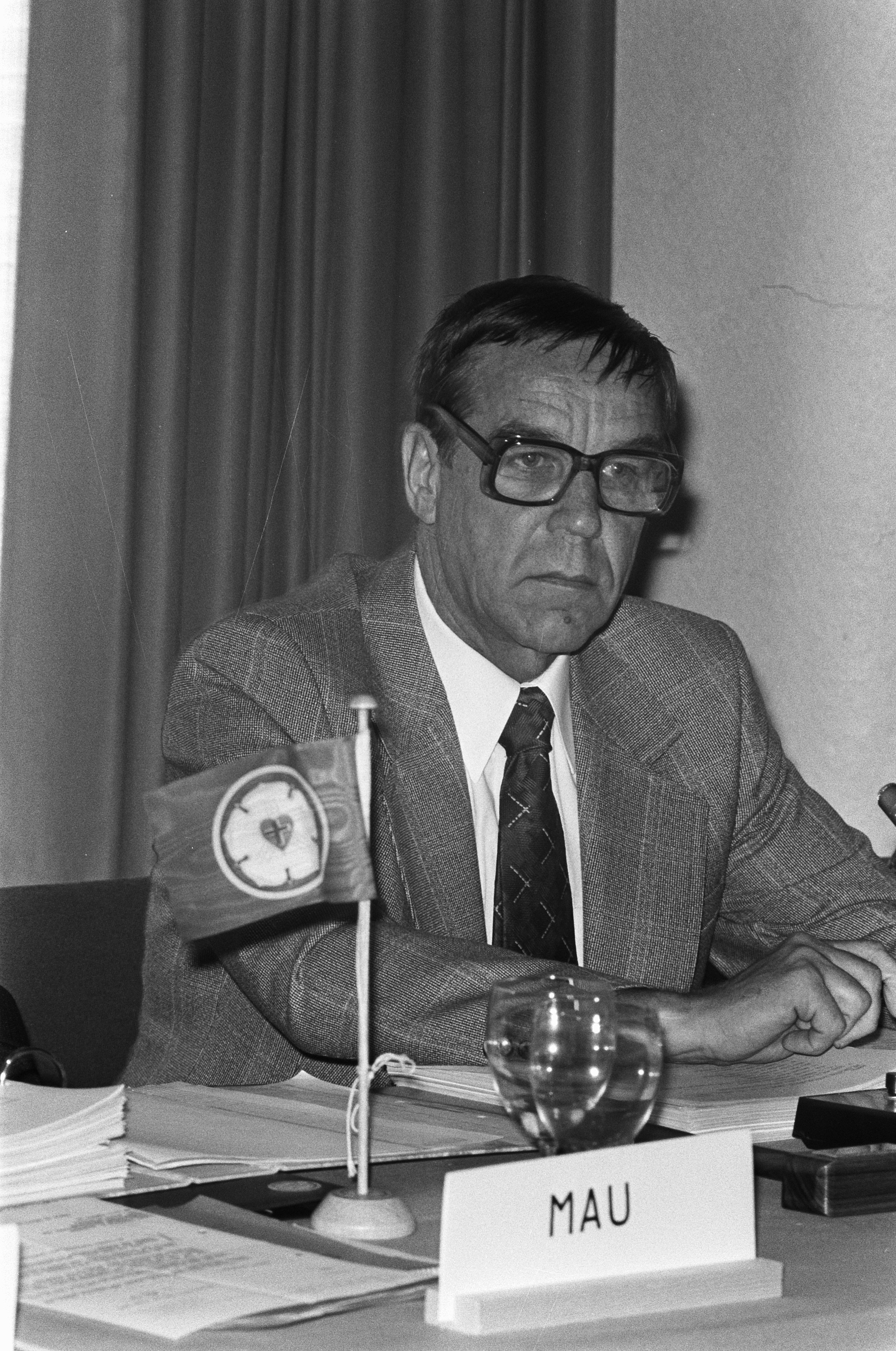
- Juva at the Lutheran World Federation conference in Amsterdam in 1975
- Church: Evangelical Lutheran Church of Finland
- Archdiocese: Turku
- In office: 1978–1982
- Predecessor: Martti Simojoki
- Successor: John Vikström

Orders
- Consecration: 1 October 1978 by Martti Simojoki

Personal details
- Born: 22 November 1918 Kaarlela, Finland (now Kokkola)
- Died: 1 January 2004 (aged 85) Turku, Finland
- Denomination: Lutheran
- Parents: Einar W. Juva (father)
- Education: University of Turku, University of Helsinki
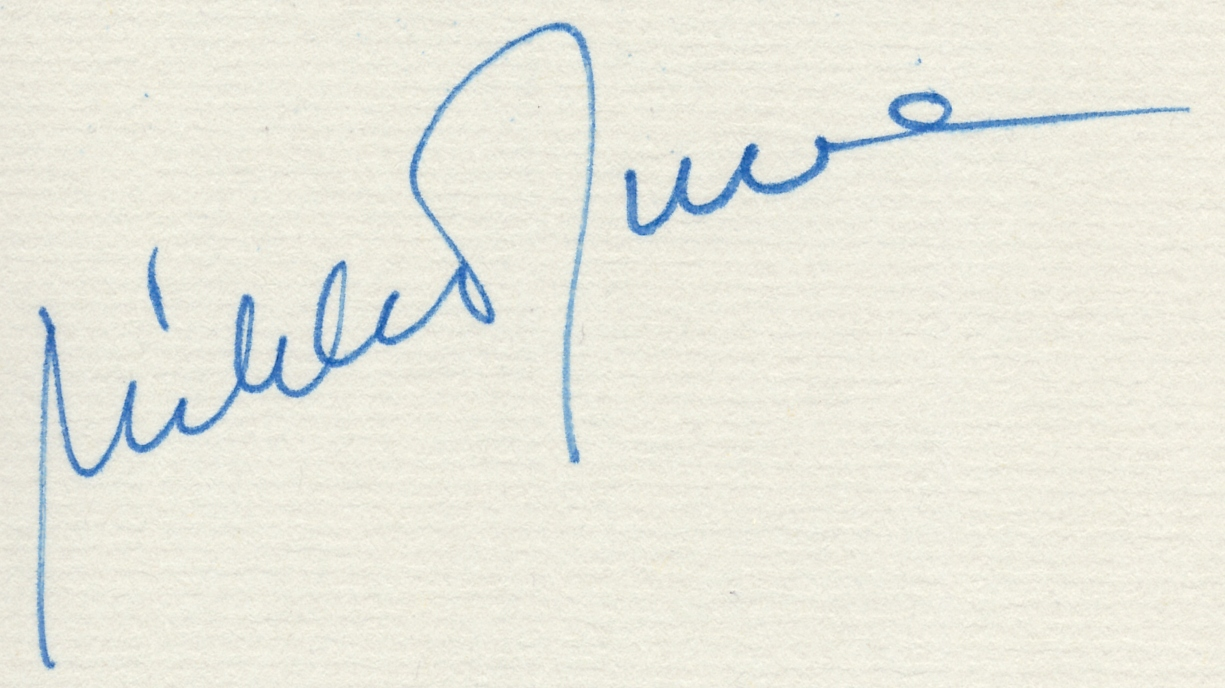
- Signature

Mikko Juva
- Military career
- Branch: Finnish Army
- Rank: First Lieutenant (military chaplain)
- Conflicts: Continuation War

Mikko Einar Juva (22 November 1918 – 1 January 2004) was a Finnish historian, theologian and Lutheran archbishop.

== Biography ==
He was professor in Nordic history 1957–1962 at the University of Turku and professor in Finnish and Scandinavian history and church history at the University of Helsinki 1962–1978. He served as rector of the University of Helsinki from 1971 to 1973 and chancellor from 1973 to 1978. He was also a member of the Finnish parliament 1964–1966 and the chairman of Liberal People's Party 1965–1968.

In his youth Mikko Juva took part in the Student Christian Movement and was student minister 1948–1950. He was archbishop of Finland 1978–1982. The most important assignment was his presidency in the Lutheran World Federation 1970–1977. He also published writings in historical and church historical subjects.

He was the son of Einar W. Juva.

== Honors ==
- Order of the Lion of Finland (Finland)
- Order of the White Rose of Finland (Finland)
- Order of the Cross of Liberty (Finland)
- Order of the House of Orange (Netherlands)
- Order of Saint Vladimir (Russia)
- Order of Merit of the Federal Republic of Germany (West-Germany)

== Published works ==
- Suomen sivistyneistö uskonnollisen vapaamielisyyden murroksessa 1848-1869 (1950) (in Finnish)
- Valtiokirkosta kansankirkoksi (1960) (in Finnish)
- Suomen kansan historia (5 parts, 1964–67, with Einar W. Juva) (in Finnish)

Titles in Lutheranism
Preceded by Martti Simojoki	Archbishop of Turku and Finland; 1978 – 1982	Succeeded by John Vikström
