= Einar W. Juva =

Finnish historian (1892–1966)

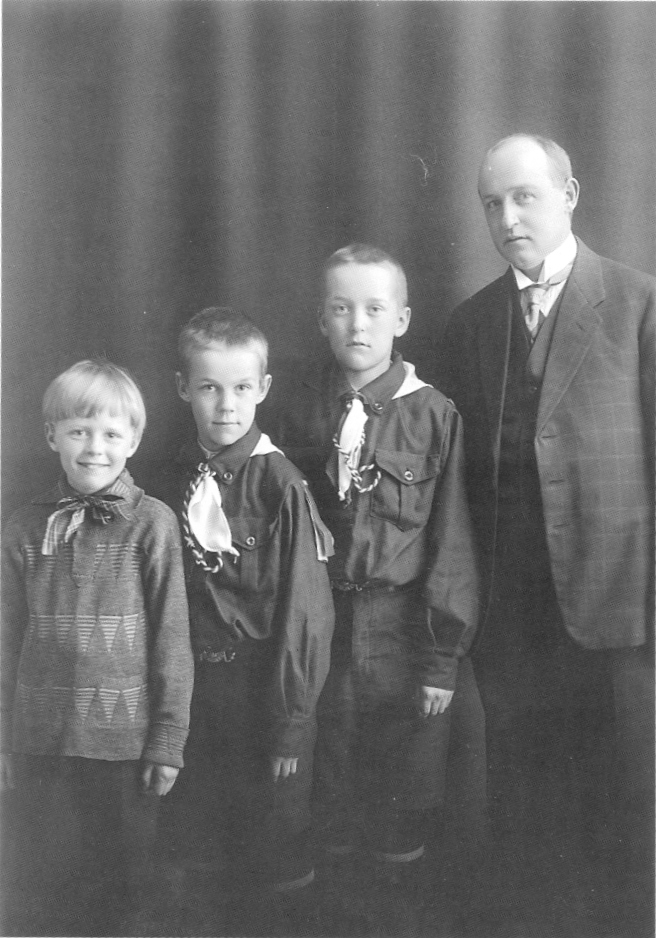
Einar W. Juva with his sons Klaus (left), Mikko and Juhani in 1929.

Einar Wilhelm Juva (7 January 1892 – 6 September 1966) was a Finnish historian, professor at Turku University 1920–1955. His surname until 1935 was Juvelius. He was born in Raahe.

He mainly outlined Finland's military and geopolitical position in the Swedish empire in the 18th century. He wrote also a survey in 10 parts on Finland's history: Suomen Kansan aikakirjat (1927–38), in which he popularised the results of the historical research. The work should be regarded as a Finnish counterpart to the works of the Swedish historian Carl Grimberg. Juva also wrote a biography of P. E. Svinhufvud and Rudolf Walden.

He served as rector of the University of Turku from 1934 to 1945. He died in Turku, aged 74.

Together with his son Mikko Juva he wrote Suomen kansan historia (5 parts, 1964–67).

== Sources ==
- Suomen kansan aikakirjat (10 vols., 1927–38)
- Suomen puolustuskysymys ison- ja pikkuvihan välisenä aikana 1721–1741 (1920)
- Suomen kansan historia (5 vols., 1964–1967, with Mikko Juva)
- Suomen tie Uudestakaupungista Haminaan (1947)
- Rudolf Walden (1957)
- P. E. Svinhufvud (2 vols., 1957–61)
