= Jukka Paarma =

Finnish bishop (born 1942)

The Most Reverend Jukka Paarma
- Archbishop Emeritus of Turku and Finland
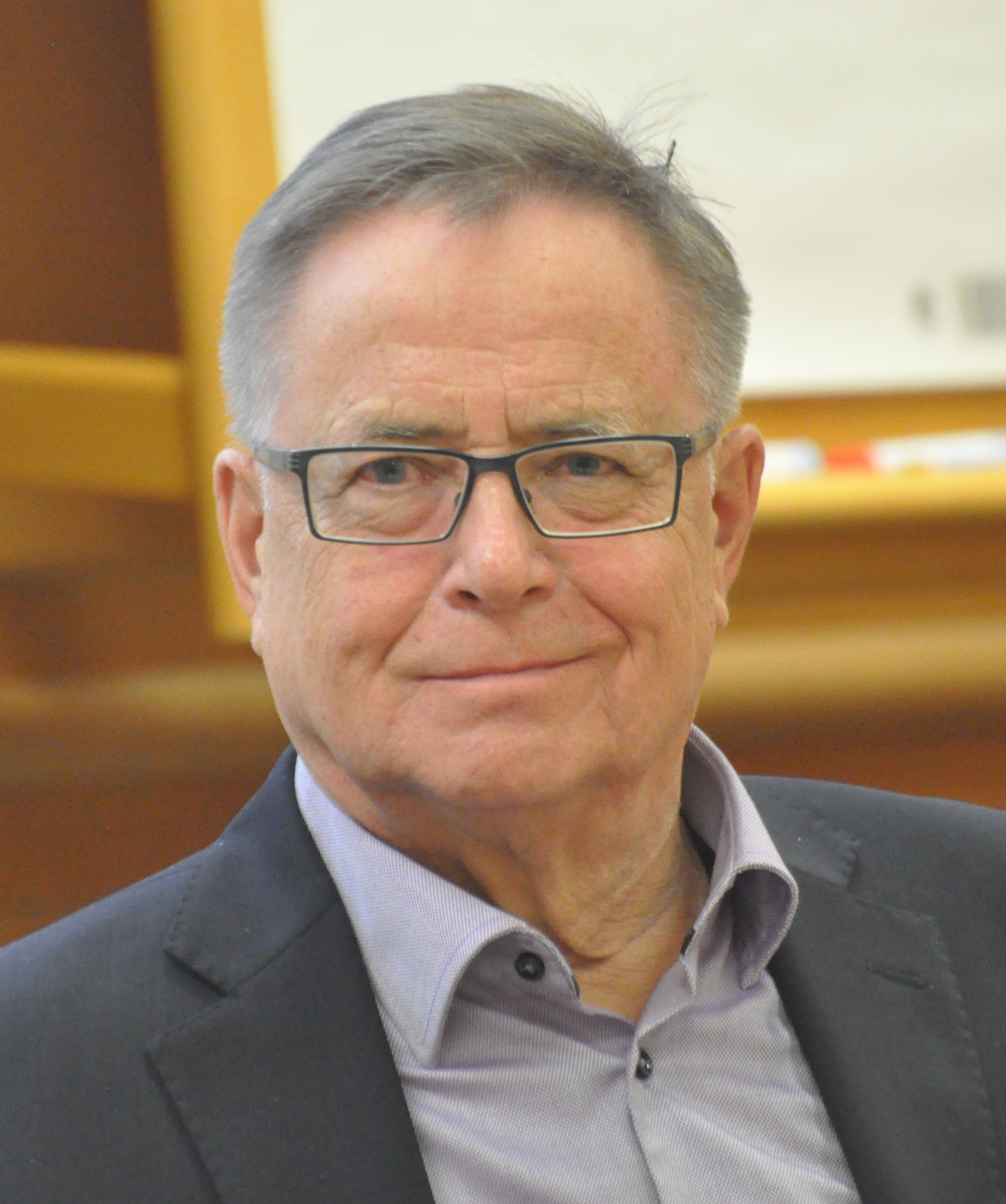
- Province: Western Finland
- Diocese: Archdiocese of Turku
- See: Turku Cathedral
- In office: 1998–2010
- Predecessor: John Vikström
- Successor: Kari Mäkinen

Orders
- Ordination: 1 June 1967 by Erkki Kansanaho
- Consecration: 1998 by Olavi Rimpiläinen

Personal details
- Born: 1 December 1942 (age 83) Lappeenranta, Finland
- Denomination: Lutheran
- Spouse: Pirjo Paarma

Antti-Jukka Paarma (born 1 December 1942 in Lappeenranta) is a Finnish Lutheran prelate who served as the Archbishop of Turku and Finland and the spiritual head of the Evangelical Lutheran Church of Finland. He retired as archbishop on 1 June 2010.

Titles in Lutheranism
Preceded by John Vikström	Archbishop of Turku and Finland; 1998–2010	Succeeded by Kari Mäkinen
