= Diet of Finland =

Former legislative assembly of Finland

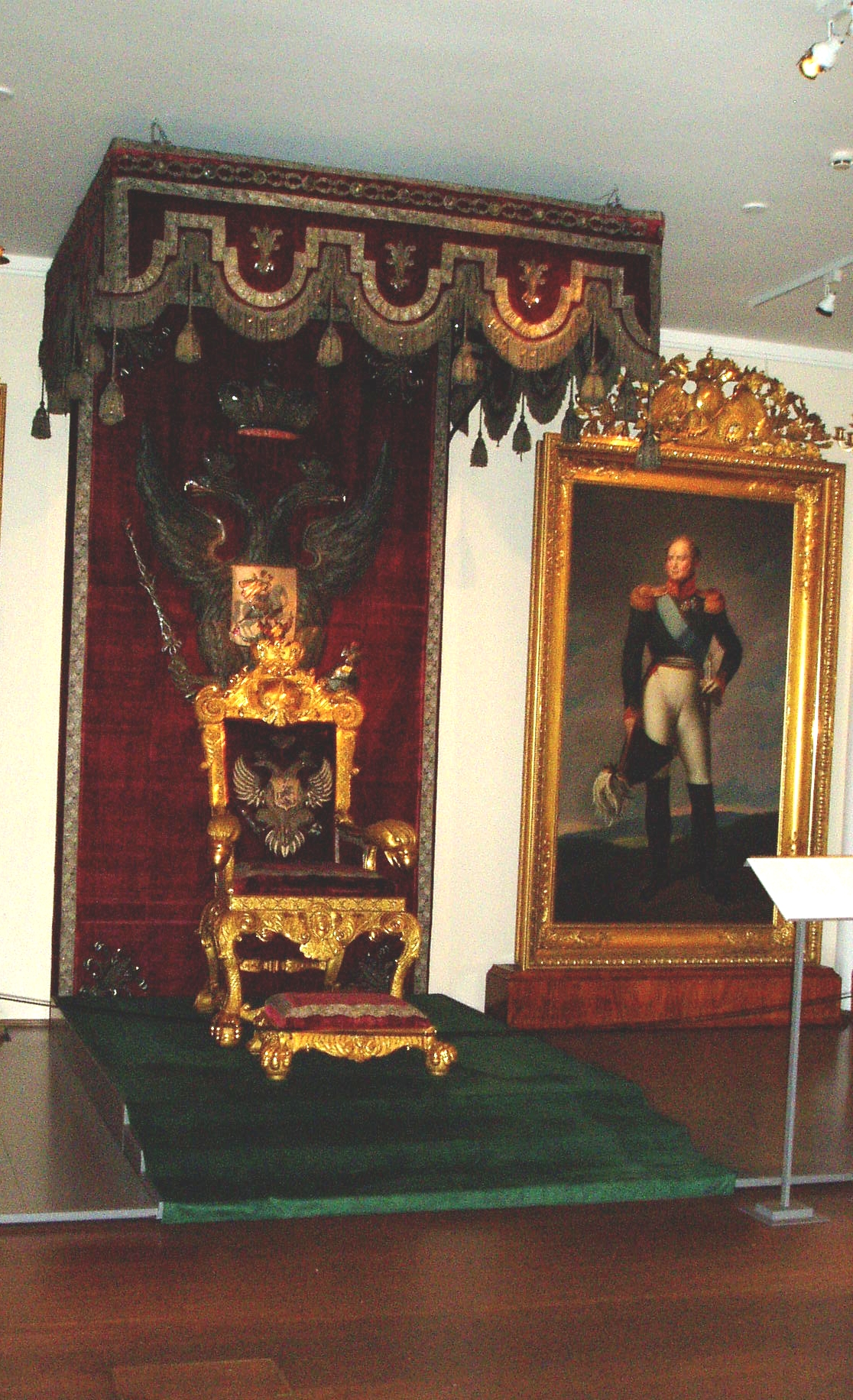
The throne used by Emperor Alexander I at the Porvoo Diet in 1809. The throne has been part of the collection of the National Museum of Finland from 1919 onwards

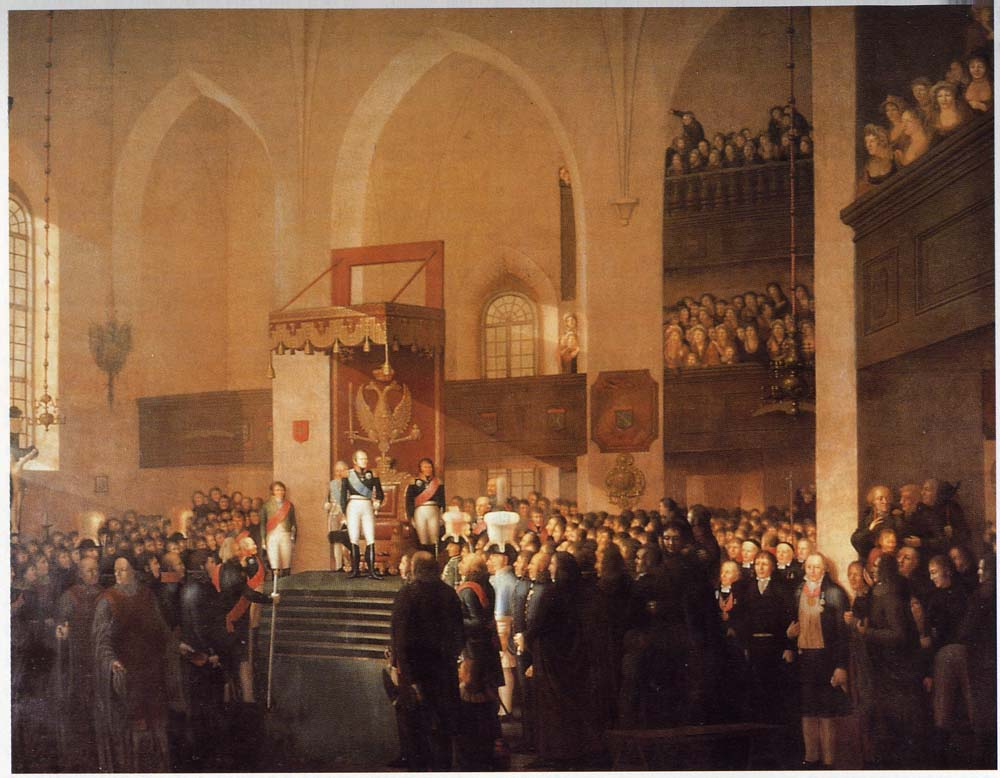
The Porvoo Diet is opened by Alexander I

The Diet of Finland (Finnish Suomen maapäivät, later valtiopäivät; Swedish Finlands Lantdagar), was the legislative assembly of the Grand Duchy of Finland from 1809 to 1906 and the recipient of the powers of the Swedish Riksdag of the Estates. (The term valtiopäivät today means an annual session of the Parliament of Finland, while in Swedish Riksdagen is now the name for both the Parliament and its sessions.)

== Åbo Lantdag ==
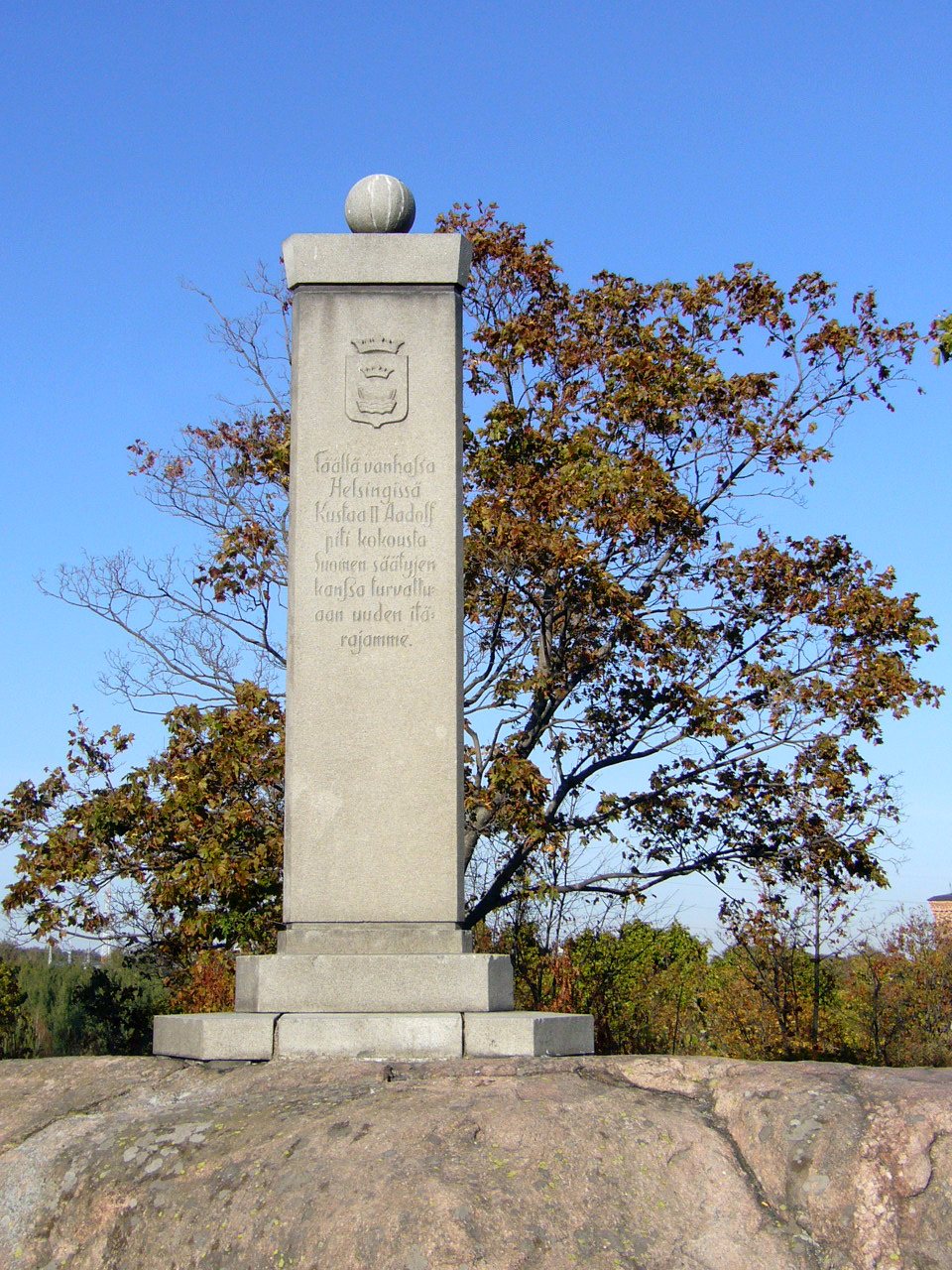
A memorial for the meeting of the states of Finland in Helsinki in 1616

The first States of Finland were held in Helsinki in 1616. Other assemblies (Åbo lantdag) were held in Turku (Åbo), for example in 1676. The assembly was called together by Axel Julius De la Gardie. The estate of peasants was chaired by Heikki Heikinpoika Vaanila.

== The Porvoo Diet ==
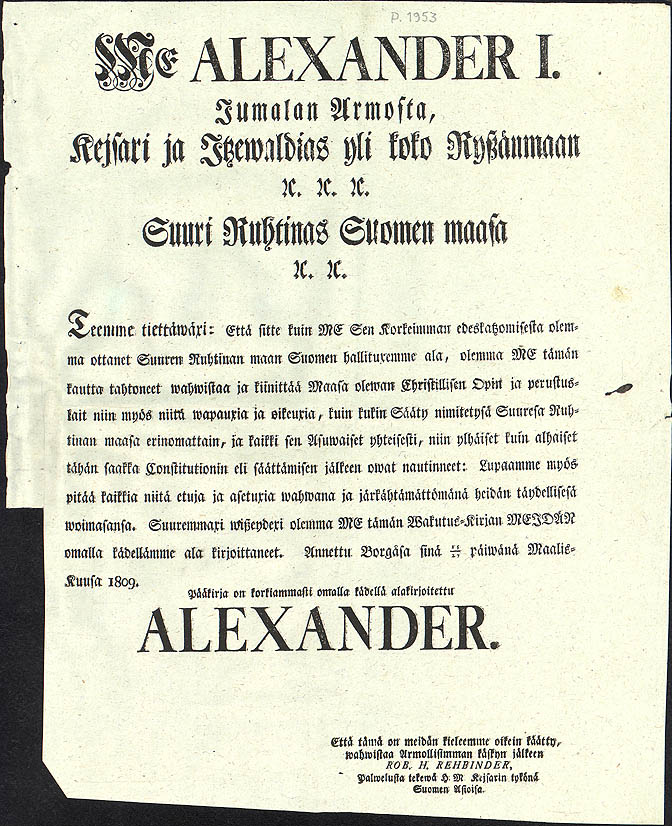
The sovereign's pledge, printed in Finnish

During the Finnish War between Sweden and Russia, the four Estates of occupied Finland (Nobility, Clergy, Bourgeoisie and Peasants) were assembled at Porvoo (Borgå) by Tsar Alexander I, the new Grand Duke of Finland, between 25 March and 19 July 1809. The central event at Porvoo was the taking of the sovereign pledge and the oaths of the Estates in Porvoo Cathedral on 29 March. Each of the Estates swore an oath of allegiance, committing themselves to accepting the Emperor as Grand Duke of Finland, and to keeping the constitution and the form of government unchanged. Alexander I subsequently promised to govern Finland in accordance with its laws. This was thought to mean that the emperor confirmed the Swedish Instrument of Government of 1772 as the constitution of Finland, although it was also interpreted to mean that all existing codes and statutes were to be respected. The Diet required that it be convened again after the Finnish War, which separated Finland from Sweden, was concluded. On 17 September that year, the conflict was settled by the Treaty of Fredrikshamn, but it was another 54 years before the Finnish Estates were called to assemble again.

== The Estates convene again ==
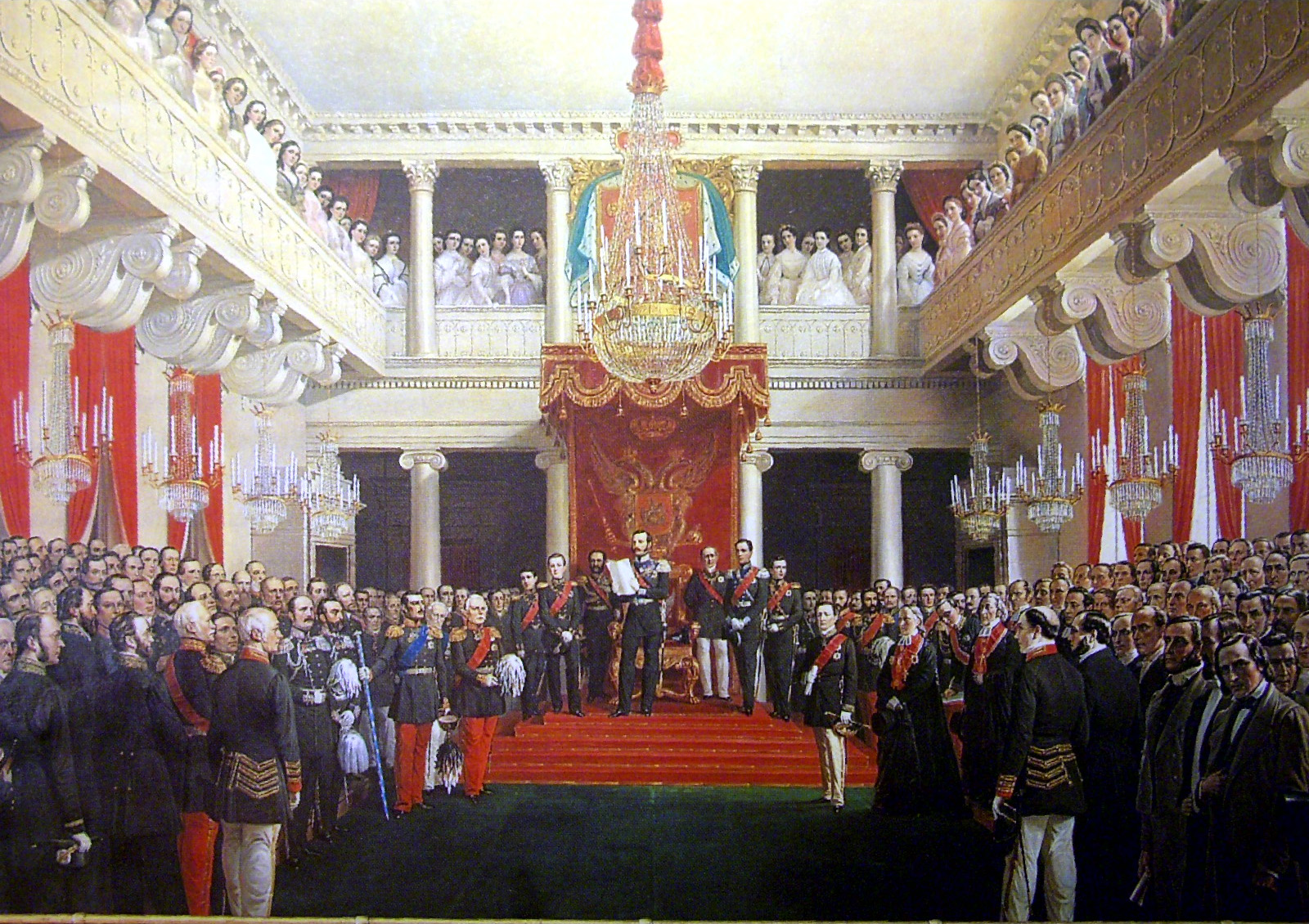
The opening of the Diet in 1863

Not until June 1863, after the Crimean War had taken place, did Alexander II call the Estates again. The opening ceremony was held on 18 September and the Emperor made his declaration promising to introduce changes to the constitution, including having the Diet meet regularly. The Diet duly met again in January 1867, when it passed a law on its own procedures. The Diet was to meet at least every fifth year, but in practice it met every third year.

In the elections for the Diet of 1872, members of the two language-based parties, the Fennomans and the Svecomans, gained more ground at the expense of the liberals. After the assassination of Alexander II the special position of Finland in the Russian empire was put in danger. Alexander III announced that the Finnish monetary, customs and postal systems were to be incorporated into their imperial counterparts. At the Diet of 1882 the Governor General announced that the Diet would have the right to submit bills, but only the Emperor would be able to initiate changes in the constitution or in the Military of the Grand Duchy of Finland.

== The first period of oppression ==
In 1899 Grand Duke Nicholas II signed what came to be known as the February Manifesto. The powers of the diet regarding Finland's internal affairs were weakened and transferred to the Russian ministers. The legal committee of the diet of 1899 adopted the opinion that the manifesto was not legally valid in Finland.

== Reform ==
The unrest during the Russo-Japanese War resulted in a general strike in Finland in October 1905. The most immediate result was the emperor's manifesto that cancelled all illegal regulations. A parliament based on universal and equal suffrage was also promised. An extraordinary session of the diet in December 1905 was called to implement the parliamentary reforms. The proposal was presented to the emperor on 15 March 1906 and after his approval it was submitted to the estates on 9 May. The reforms came to force on 1 October 1906. The diet was reformed from a legislative assembly of four estates into a unicameral parliament of 200 members. At the same time universal suffrage was introduced, which gave all men and women, 24 years or older, the right to vote and stand for election. Acts on the right of parliament to monitor members of the government, on the freedom of speech, assembly and association, and freedom of the press were also introduced. These reforms established the hallmarks of today's Parliament of Finland. The first election to the new parliament was arranged in 1907.

== Composition and procedure 1869–1906 ==
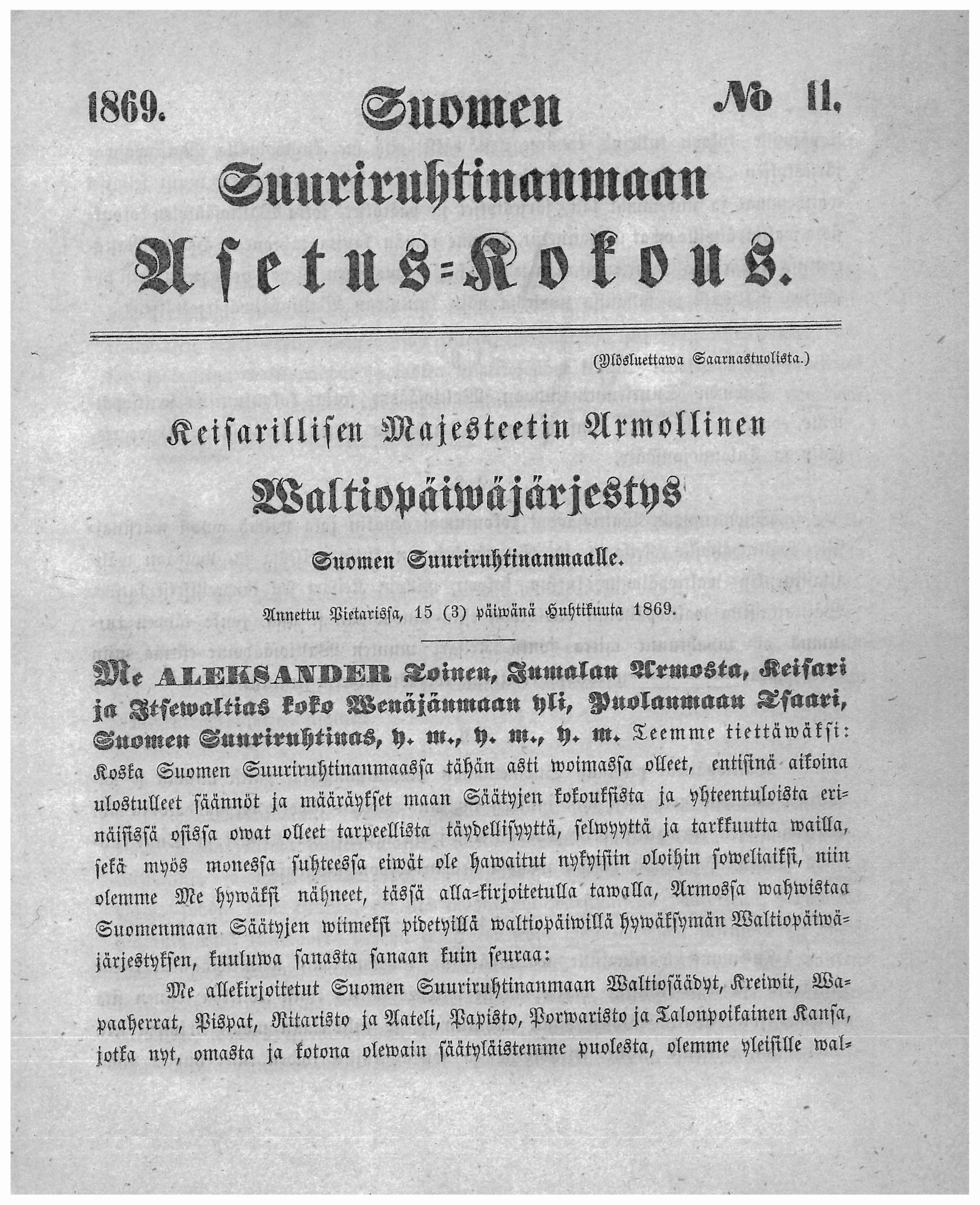
First page of the order by Alexander II of Russia for the Diet of 1869 in Finnish

From 1869 to 1906, the Diet of Finland was tetracameral, being composed as follows:

- Nobility: 201 seats; the heads of noble families had the right either to sit in person or to name a family member as a representative.
- Clergy: 40 seats; included bishops, priests elected from each bishopric, and elected representatives of university personnel and other senior teachers.
- Bourgeoisie: 30–70 seats; these were the representatives of the people living in cities, but only men with taxable wealth were eligible to vote. The number of seats rose when the number of such men grew.
- Peasants: 70 seats; elected through indirect elections in which only peasants who owned land, about 4.5 per cent of the rural population in the early 1900s, could vote. Each municipality in a given rural district chose at least one elector, and these electors together chose the representative for their district.

Normally, all four chambers debated separately, and in the whole history of the Diet there were only two joint sessions, at which voting was not permitted. At least three of the four chambers had to pass a bill before it could be approved by the Emperor. Consensus was sought through joint committees. Any bill affecting the privileges of an estate could be passed only with the consent of that estate. All four chambers had to agree in order to modify constitutional laws.

== Sessions and meeting places of the Diet ==
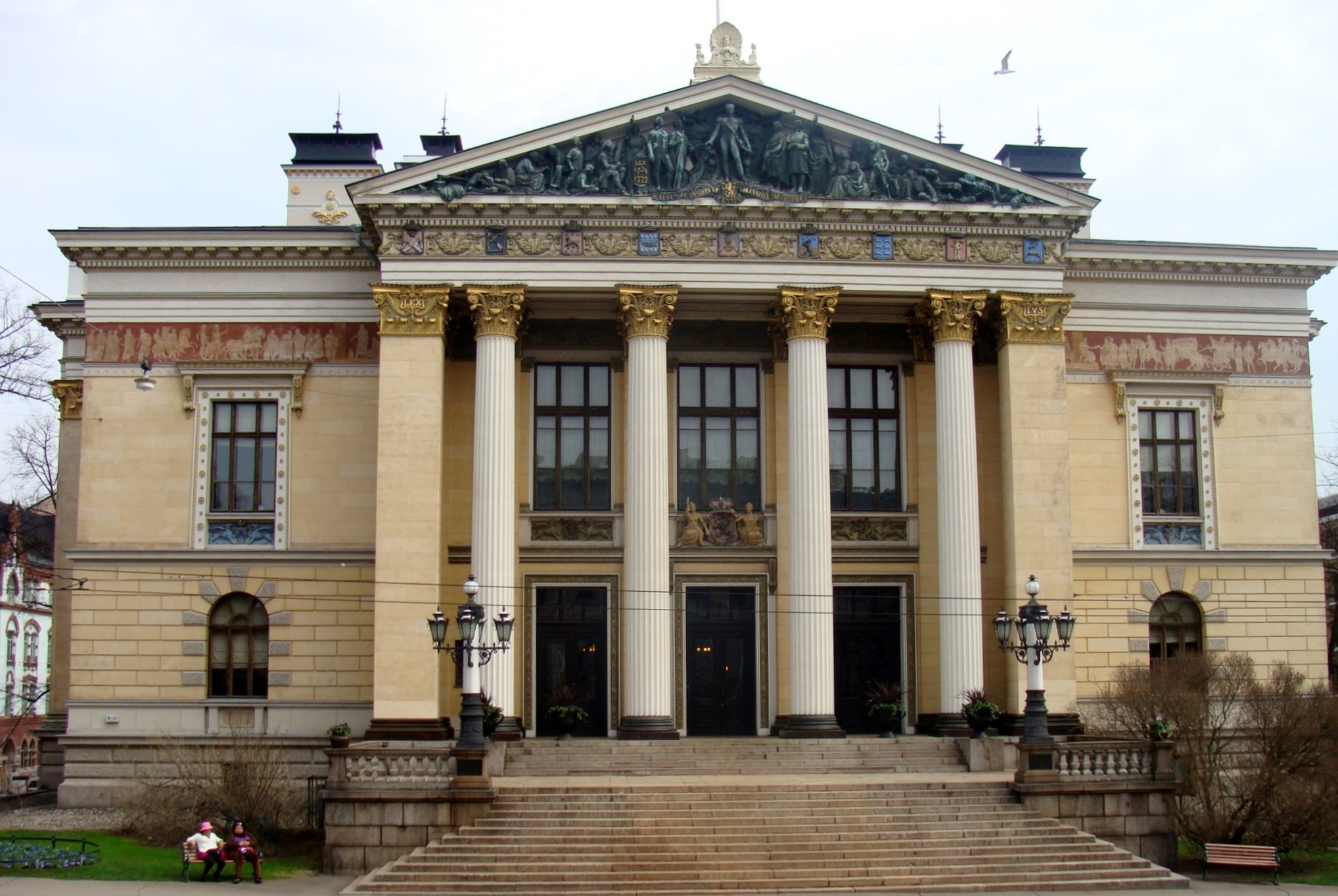
The House of the Estates in Snellmaninkatu in Helsinki was the meeting place of the lower estates

List of sessions of the Finnish diet.

- 1809 (January to July);
- 1863–1864 (September 1863 to April 1864);
- 1867 (January to May);
- 1872 (February to June);
- 1877–1878; (January 1877 to January 1878);
- 1882 (January to June);
- 1885 (January to May);
- 1888 (January to May);
- 1891 (January to May);
- 1894 (January to June);
- 1897 (January to June);
- 1899 (January to May);
- 1900 (January to June);
- 1904–1905 (December 1904 to April 1905);
- 1906 (January to September);

The Diet of Finland, and the four estates of which it was composed, met in a number of different locations during its existence. In the 1860s, all the estates met in the Finnish House of Nobility. The Nobility of Finland continued to meet there until 1906, but the three commoner estates later met in other locations, such as in 1888, when they met in the new building of the Ateneum Art Museum. From 1891 until the parliamentary reform of 1906 the three commoner estates of Clergy, Bourgeoisie and Peasants met in the newly built House of the Estates (Finnish Säätytalo, Swedish Ständerhuset). However, the meeting rooms of the house were too small for the 200-member unicameral parliament. The house has since seen sporadic use by the state, and regular use by scientific and scholarly organizations.

== Diets and speakers ==
Diet	Lantmarskalk of the Nobility	Archbishop of the Clergy	Speaker for the Bourgeoisie	Speaker for the Peasants
Diet of 1809	Robert Wilhelm De Geer	Jacob Tengström	Kristian Trapp	Pehr Klockars
Diet of 1863	Johan Mauritz Nordenstam	Edvard Bergenheim	Robert Isidor Örn	Aukusti Mäkipeska
Diet of 1867	Johan Mauritz Nordenstam	Edvard Bergenheim	Frans Wilhelm Frenckell	Aukusti Mäkipeska
Diet of 1872	Johan Mauritz Nordenstam	Edvard Bergenheim	H. W. J. Zilliacus	Aukusti Mäkipeska
Diet of 1877	Johan August von Born	Edvard Bergenheim	Alexander R. Frey –14.6.1877; Georg Wallgren 14.6.1877–	Carl Johan Slotte
Diet of 1882	Samuel Werner von Troil	Anders Johan Hornborg	Lorenz Lindelöf	Carl Johan Slotte
Diet of 1885	Samuel Werner von Troil	Torsten Thure Renvall	Joachim Kurtén	Carl Johan Slotte
Diet of 1888	Victor von Haartman	Torsten Thure Renvall	Joachim Kurtén	Carl Johan Slotte
Diet of 1891	Victor von Haartman	Torsten Thure Renvall	Joachim Kurtén	Carl Johan Slotte
Diet of 1894	Lars Teodor von Hellens	Torsten Thure Renvall	Joachim Kurtén	Kaarle Wärri
Diet of 1897	Samuel Werner von Troil	?	Joachim Kurtén	Kaarle Wärri
Diet of 1899	Samuel Werner von Troil	Gustaf Johansson	Joachim Kurtén	Kaarle Wärri
Diet of 1900	Lorenz Lindelöf	Gustaf Johansson	Felix Heikel	Kaarle Ojanen
Diet of 1904–1905	Constantin Linder (1904), Ossian Wuorenheimo (acting 1904, officially 1905)	Gustaf Johansson	Hugo Lilius	Kaarle Ojanen
Diet of 1905–1906	Viktor Magnus von Born	Gustaf Johansson	Leonard von Pfaler	Pekka Aulin

== See also ==
- Lantmarskalks of the Finnish House of Nobility
- Parliament of Finland
- Senate of Finland
- Governor-General of Finland
- Finnish nobility
