= Carl Fabian Langenskiöld =

Finnish senator and finance chief (1810–1863)

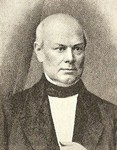
- Born: 17 November 1810; Sääksmäki, Finland
- Died: 29 June 1863 (aged 52); Helsinki, Grand Duchy of Finland
- Occupations: Civil servant, provincial governor, senator
- Years active: 1838–1863
- Known for: The 1860 monetary reform that gave Finland the markka
- Spouse: Maria Magdalena af Björkstén (m. 1848)

Carl Fabian Theodor Langenskiöld (17 November 1810 – 29 June 1863) was a civil servant and statesman in the Grand Duchy of Finland. A command of Russian carried him from teaching into administration, and he was a provincial governor from 1853 and a member of the Senate of Finland from 1857. As head of the Senate's finance division he obtained the imperial manifesto of 1860 that gave Finland a currency of its own, the markka. A defender of the Senate's authority, he was reserved about summoning the Diet and accepted the preparatory committee of 1861 instead. The criticism this brought him led to his resignation, and he died before the Diet finally met later that year.

== Career ==
Langenskiöld was the son of the provincial governor Anders Gustaf Langenskiöld and Hedvig Gustafva Gripenberg, and a grandson of Lars Adam Lang, ennobled Langenskiöld, who took part in Gustav III's coup and later in the Anjala League. He was a pupil at Odert Gripenberg's boarding school from 1819, matriculated at Åbo in 1825 and took his degrees there in 1832 with the highest mark in mathematics, and published a textbook on logarithms and plane trigonometry in 1838, reprinted in 1858 and 1864.

Intending a teaching career, he applied unsuccessfully for a lectureship in Russian in 1835 and in 1838 became a teacher of the language at the cadet corps in Fredrikshamn, having studied the language at Kazan in 1832–1835 and at Moscow in 1839, the year he also published an essay on Russian verbs written in Russian. His fluency opened an administrative path instead: he was appointed translator of Russian at the Senate in 1842 and at the State Secretariat for Finland in 1847, posts that let him follow the most important business of the Grand Duchy at close quarters. He was governor of Saint Michel Province from 1853, acting governor of Nyland from 1854, and governor of Åbo and Björneborg from 1856.

== Head of the Senate's finance division ==
Langenskiöld was appointed a senator in 1857 and in 1858 succeeded Lars Gabriel von Haartman as head of the Senate's finance division. He set out to remove obstacles to economic development, with the backing of Governor-General F. W. R. Berg. The measures of his tenure included a settlement of the customs arrangements between Finland and Russia in 1859, faster progress on the railway from Helsinki to Hämeenlinna, the first steps towards abolishing compulsory guild membership, and the removal of fiscal restrictions on the sawmill industry.

His principal achievement was in monetary policy. The reform had been initiated by von Haartman in the 1840s, and Langenskiöld pressed it forward at a time when notes of fluctuating value were causing severe disruption. An initial Senate proposal was rejected in January 1860, but he exploited a favourable mood in Saint Petersburg and obtained a manifesto of 4 April 1860. By it Finland received a currency unit of its own, the markka, although Russian banknotes remained legal tender at a rate fixed by law. Carrying the reform into practice fell to his successor J. V. Snellman, whom Langenskiöld recommended for the post as his last act in office. Snellman, who is often called the father of the markka, readily acknowledged that he had inherited the reform from Langenskiöld.

== The Diet question and resignation ==
Langenskiöld held that a strong Senate was the only real guarantee of Finland's form of government, and he was reserved about summoning the Diet, which had not met since 1809 and next met in 1863, after his death. When Alexander II proposed in 1861 that a committee drawn from the four Estates should meet instead, Langenskiöld accepted the plan as better than nothing. Critics held that he had lacked the political courage to insist on a Diet and that the question had thereby been pushed onto a side track. He came to regard the episode as a political mistake, and joined his uncle Sebastian Gripenberg — later chairman of the committee — in asking Berg to abandon it. Opinion turned against him in his last years as finance chief for a further reason: a loan raised with the Rothschild bank in Frankfurt without the participation of the Estates was held to be contrary to the constitution. The accusations that followed led him to resign, and he died shortly afterwards.

He was made a baron in 1863 and, three months before his death, received the rank of privy councillor, rarely granted to senators. He held the first class of the Order of Saint Anna and of the Order of Saint Stanislaus.
