= Johan Mauritz Nordenstam =

Finnish general and politician (1802–1882)

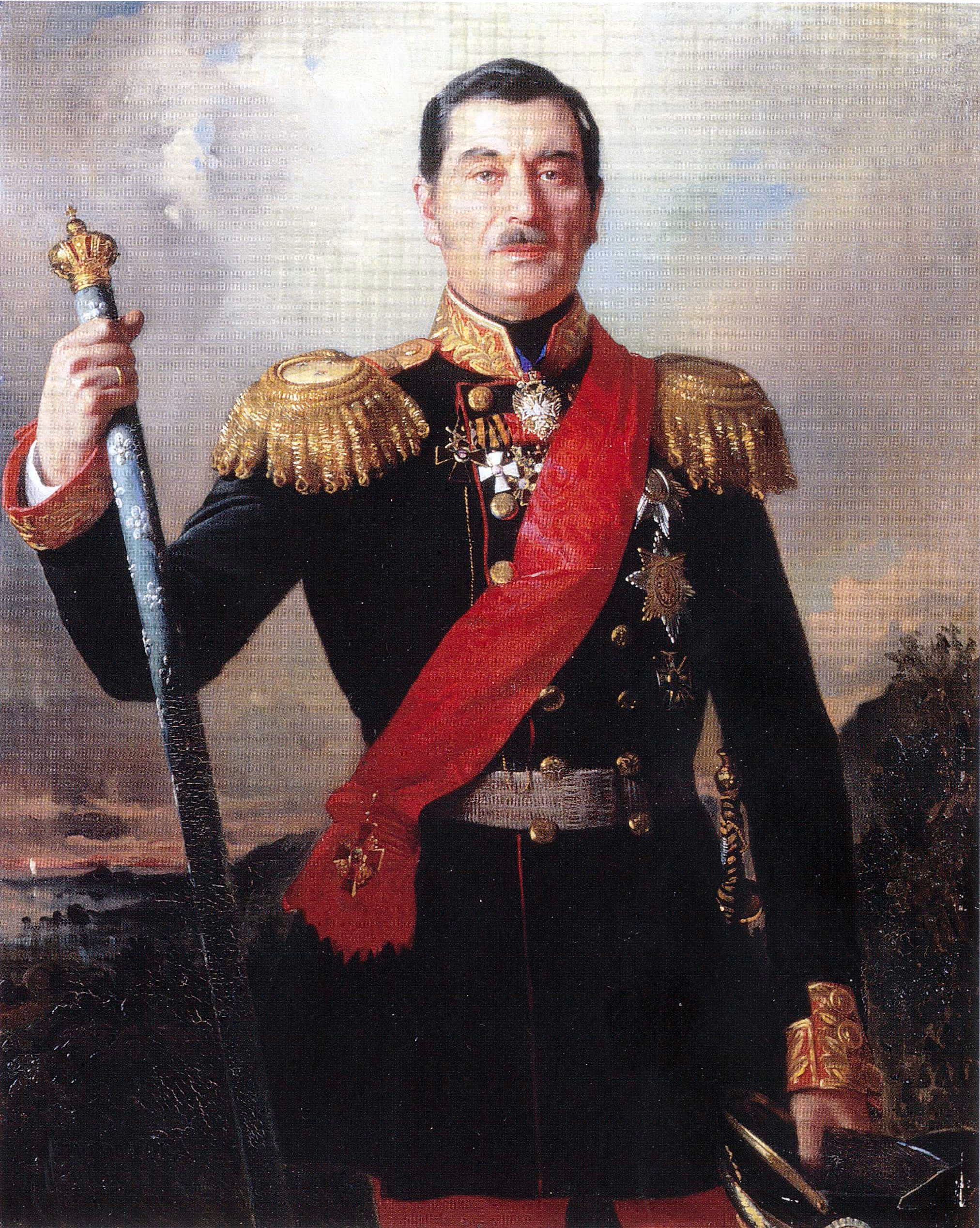
Johan Mauritz Nordenstam, painted by Konstantin Makovsky in 1865.

Baron Johan Mauritz Nordenstam (21 September 1802 – 8 June 1882) was a Finnish general who served as Vice Chairman of the Economic Division of the Senate of Finland, an office preceding that of Prime Minister, from 1858 to his death in 1882. He was the longest-serving head of government in Finnish history. He also served as the governor of Uusimaa Province from 1847 to 1858, vice chancellor of the University of Helsinki from 1847 to 1855, and a senator without portfolio from 1848 to 1858. He briefly served as acting Governor-General five times, and was Lord Marshal (speaker) at the first three sessions of the Diet of Finland following 54 years without an assembly.

Professor August Ahlqvist was Nordenstam's illegitimate son. Nordenstam also posthumously became the stepgrandfather of Marshal Carl Gustaf Emil Mannerheim, as his daughter married Mannerheim's father, Carl Robert Mannerheim, in 1883.

== Biography ==
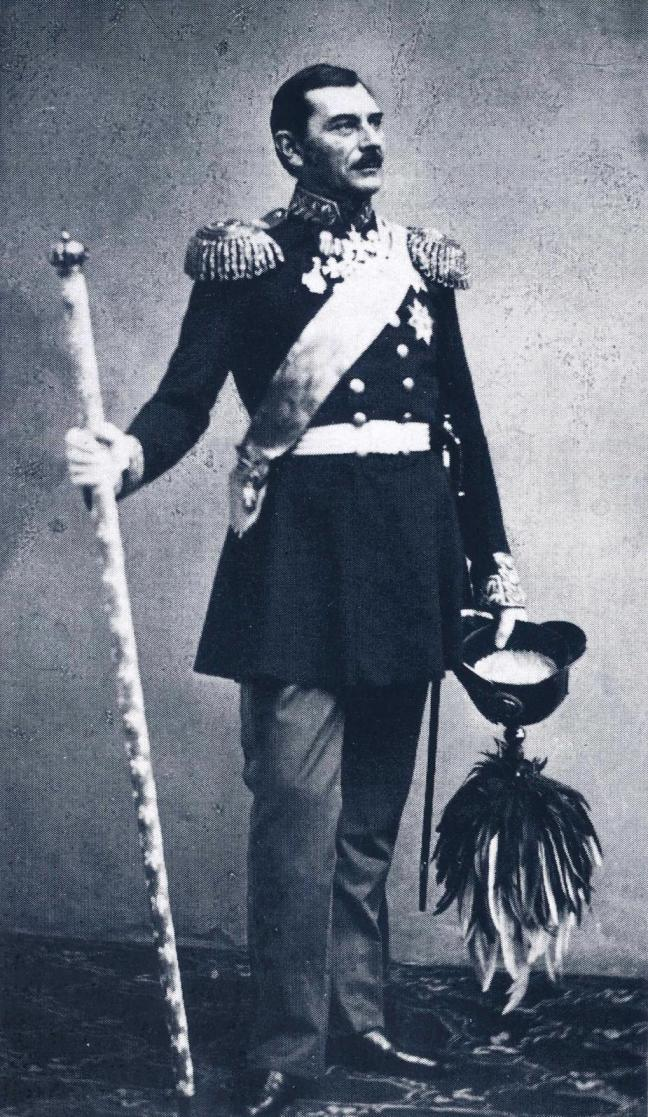
Nordenstam in uniform and with a Lord Marshal's staff of office in 1864.

Nordenstam was born to a Swedish army officer and a Finnish noblewoman in Stockholm; his father entered the service of the Russian-controlled Grand Duchy of Finland after Sweden lost Finland in the Finnish War in 1809. After going to a gymnasium in St. Petersburg, Nordenstam enrolled in Hamina Cadet School, graduated at the top of his class in 1823 and was commissioned as a sub-lieutenant in the Imperial Russian Army. He served in the Russo-Turkish War (1828–1829) and then in the Caucasus for 18 years from 1829 onwards, taking part in battles of the Caucasian War and reaching the rank of major general in 1843. He briefly served as civilian governor of Stavropol Governorate, but was strongly opposed by locals for his harsh style of leadership, and was recalled to Saint Petersburg, from where he returned to Finland. He was later promoted to lieutenant general in 1853, full General of the Infantry in 1870 and adjutant general in 1874. He was created a baron in 1860 and introduced to his peers at the House of Nobility in 1861.

On his return to Finland in 1847, Nordenstam was appointed governor of Uusimaa Province and vice chancellor of the University of Helsinki. He was also appointed a member of the Senate and head of the supreme censorship council in 1848. He prioritised his position at the university at first, aiming to prevent the spread of ideologies associated with the Revolutions of 1848 among Finnish students. While widespread radicalisation did not occur, his strict policies led to students staging some acts of protest, notably boycotting a ball Nordenstam held in honour of Tsesarevich Alexander Nikolayevich in 1851; the crown prince accepted Nordenstam's appeal to pardon the dissenters. After Alexander's accession to the throne as Alexander II in 1855, Nordenstam had to step down from the university in favour of a more liberal replacement.

He was appointed as Vice Chairman of the Economic Division of the Senate of Finland in 1858, succeeding Lars Gabriel von Haartman. This position corresponded to the later office of Prime Minister. A high rank in its own right, it additionally entitled him to serve as acting Governor-General of Finland, the highest authority in the land and representative of the Emperor, which he did on several occasions; for months at a time, he was responsible for the duties of Governor-Generals Friedrich Wilhelm Rembert von Berg (1861), Platon Rokassovsky (1864) and Nikolay Adlerberg (1868, 1870, 1872–73).

Nordenstam also had an active role in bringing regular legislative assemblies to Finland. He influenced Alexander II's decision to call the Diet of Finland in 1863 for the first time since 1809; from this point onward, the Diet convened regularly until its replacement with the current Parliament of Finland in 1906, and Nordenstam served as its Lord Marshal (speaker) at three consecutive sessions: 1863–64, 1867 and 1872. He led a committee which prepared constitutional reforms that came into effect in 1869. He also presided over the construction of the Helsinki–Riihimäki and Riihimäki–Saint Petersburg railway lines and the renovation of the Imperial Palace of Helsinki, which is now the Presidential Palace. In his last years, he supported the introduction of conscription in Finland, which began in 1878.

Despite his long tenure as "Prime Minister", Nordenstam remains a relatively obscure figure in Finnish history. Study of him is made more difficult by the fact that he destroyed a large part of his personal archive before his death.
