= Melartin =

Melartin is a Finnish surname. Notable people with the surname include:

- Erik Gabriel Melartin (1780–1847), Finnish archbishop
- Erkki Melartin (1875–1937), Finnish composer
