= Torsten Kurtén =

Finnish colonel (1871–1966)

- Born: 20 January 1871; Vaasa
- Died: 5 September 1966 (aged 95); Helsinki
- Military career
- Allegiance: Russia (1892–1908) Finland (1918)
- Rank: Colonel
- Unit: Käkisalmi Regiment Bodyguards (1892–1902) Cadet School (1902–1908)
- Other work: Manager at a forwarding company

Torsten Alarik Kurtén (20 January 1871 – 5 September 1966) was a Finnish colonel. Kurtén left the Russian army to become an operations manager at the Boström forwarding company. In 1918, during the Finnish Civil War, Kurtén became the Deputy Chief of Staff for the White Army of Finland. He later returned to his earlier work at the forwarding company in Hanko.

Kurtén was the son of Joachim Kurtén, a trade councillor and representative of the bourgeoisie of Vaasa, and Rosa Julie Emilia Steng. He began his military career as an adult and graduated from cadet school in 1892. Subsequently, he served in the Käkisalmi Regiment's bodyguards for ten years. Kurtén later served for a year as the adjutant of the cadet school and as the school's treasurer until the school closed in 1908.

In the autumn of 1908, he entered civilian life at Karl Boström's forwarding company in Hanko. In Hanko, he was on the board of Hanko Savings Bank from 1915-1931 and on the Supreme Board of the bank from 1932-1940. While in Hanko, he worked as the vice-consul of Denmark from 1909-1940 and as a consular agent for France from 1926-1940.

The Finnish Civil War led Kurtén to return to army service. He joined the leadership of the Finnish White Guards, moving to the army headquarters in South Ostrobothnia. After the war he returned to Hanko, in which he continued to work for Karl Boström. He also served as the chairman of the city council between 1921 and 1930. He was elected as a presidential elector during the 1925 presidential elections from the RKP. However, he was unable to participate in the election himself and a substitute voted in his stead. Kurtén became the operations manager at Karl Boström's company in 1925 and remained in that position until 1940.
