= Kurtén =

Kurtén is a surname that may refer to:

- Björn Kurtén (1924–1988), Finnish paleontologist
- Joachim Kurtén (1836–1899), Finnish politician
- Martin Kurtén (born 1935), Finnish actor who acted in the 1979 film Herr Puntila and His Servant Matti
