= Kaarle Ojanen =

Kaarle Ojanen may refer to:

- Kaarle Ojanen (chess player)
- Kaarle Ojanen (politician)
