= Diet of 1863 =

Session of the Finnish Diet, 1863–1864

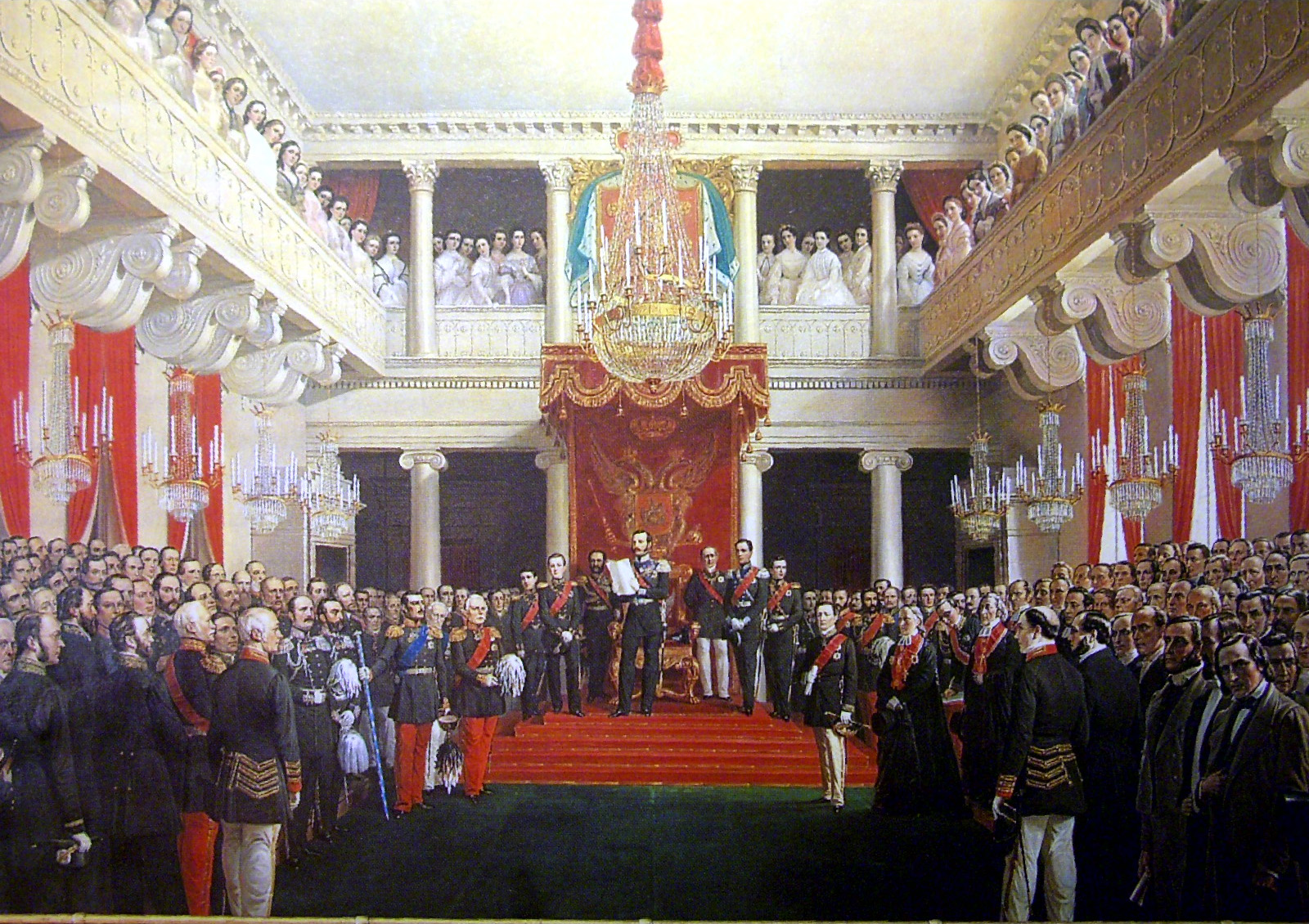
- Emperor Alexander II Declares the 1863 Diet Session Open, painted by Robert Wilhelm Ekman in 1865
- Native name: Lantdagen 1863
- Date: 15 September 1863 – 15 April 1864
- Venue: House of Nobility
- Location: Helsinki, Grand Duchy of Finland

The Diet of 1863 (Swedish: Lantdagen 1863; Finnish: Säätyvaltiopäivät 1863) was the second session of the Diet of the Estates of the Grand Duchy of Finland and the first since the Diet of Porvoo of 1809. Summoned by Emperor Alexander II, it sat in Helsinki from 15 September 1863 to 15 April 1864, ending more than fifty years without a national representation. The Emperor promised to call the Estates regularly and to restore their right to initiate legislation. The Estates in turn worked through 48 imperial bills in seven months. The Diet opened the era of regular Diets that lasted until 1906. Together with the Language Rescript issued the same summer, it is generally seen as the point at which the political camps in the language question began to take firmer shape.

== Background ==
After the Diet of Porvoo in 1809 the Estates of Finland were not summoned for more than half a century. In 1856 the Emperor approved a programme of reform for the Grand Duchy covering trade, industry, schooling, communications and officials' salaries — a programme that required new legislation and new taxes, which under the 18th-century Swedish laws still in force could hardly be enacted without the Diet.

Unwilling to summon a Diet while Poland was unsettled, Alexander II announced in 1861 that a committee of representatives of the Estates would meet instead, a plan drawn up by Fabian Langenskiöld of the Senate of Finland. Liberal opinion took this as a breach of the country's constitution, and a sharp newspaper polemic followed before the Emperor declared the committee purely preparatory. The committee met in Helsinki in early 1862 and prepared the business for a future Diet. According to Henrik Meinander, Alexander II would still have preferred a bureaucratic solution, but the corresponding reform of Poland collapsed into open insurrection in the spring of 1863. He was then obliged to meet Finnish expectations, and resolved to make Finland a showcase for Russian liberalism.

== The session ==
A writ issued at Tsarskoye Selo in June 1863 commanded that a Diet open in Helsinki that September. All four Estates — nobility, clergy, burghers and peasants — were given rooms in the House of Nobility, where they first sat on 17 September. The nobility elected its own speaker, who bore the title of Marshal of the Diet (lantmarskalk); the speakers of the other three Estates were appointed by the Emperor.

At the formal opening on 18 September the Emperor announced amendments to the constitutional laws, to be laid before the next Diet in three years, and undertook to summon the Estates to recurring Diets thereafter. The amendments were to extend the Estates' right of self-taxation and to restore the right of initiative they had held before 1809, though he reserved "the initiative in constitutional questions" to himself.

A list of 48 imperial bills was then read out. The Diet sat for seven months. The Emperor was absent from the closing ceremony on 15 April 1864, and the Governor-General dissolved it on his behalf. In his speech the Emperor thanked the Estates for their loyalty, but regretted "that some of the proceedings at the Diet have given rise to misunderstandings concerning the relation of the Grand Duchy to the Russian Empire".

== Language ==
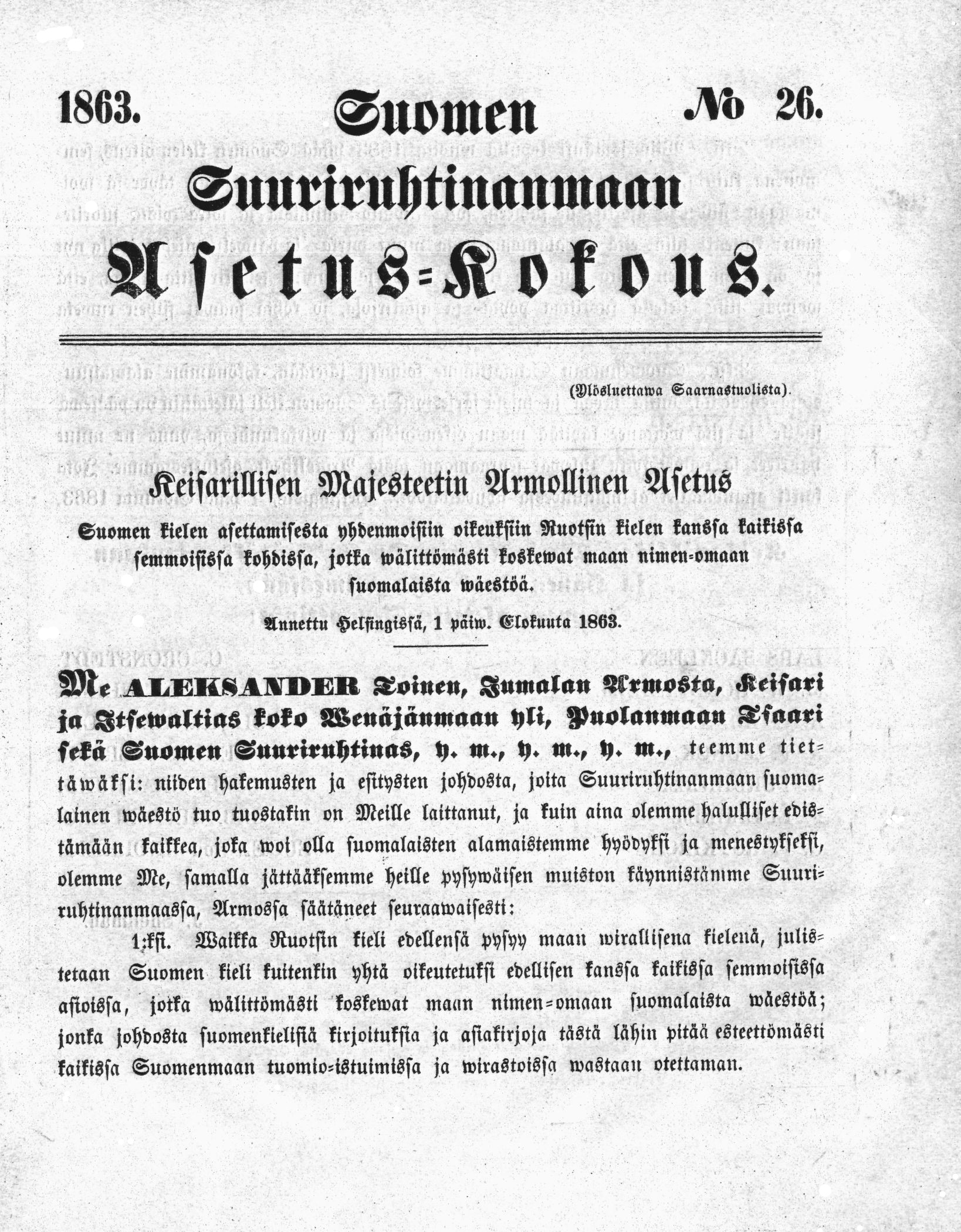
First page of the Language Rescript of 1863

The Diet was conducted in Swedish, the language of administration, but the proceedings were bilingual at several points. The Emperor delivered his speech from the throne in French; it was read out afterwards in Swedish and in Finnish, and the sermon at the opening service was preached first in Swedish and immediately afterwards in Finnish. The peasants were the only Estate bilingual in practice: some members knew only Finnish and others only Swedish, so Carl Gustaf Borg, lecturer in the Finnish language, was appointed to interpret. In the Estate's printed minutes, speeches delivered in Swedish were marked with quotation marks.

The language question itself was not settled by the Diet. In the same summer that the Estates were summoned, J. V. Snellman obtained the so-called Language Rescript of 1863, which laid down that within twenty years Finnish was to be placed on an equal footing with Swedish as a language of administration. The term was later extended, and when the provision was carried out in full in 1902 the equality was extended to Russian as well. With the summoning of the Diet and the adoption of the Rescript, the Finnish Party is usually dated to this year.

== Decisions and aftermath ==
Medal "In Memory of the Finnish Diet" of 1863–1864

The bills covered a wide field, among them a new criminal code, a church law, local government in town and country, elementary schools, private banks of issue, freedom of trade and the distilling of spirits. The Estates resolved that spirits should be made by controlled industrial distilling and that no distillery might be set up in the countryside without the consent of a majority of the parish's voting members, which ended home distillation in rural districts. They also granted a loan of up to 18 million marks for elementary schools, lighthouses, fairways, canals and roads. The bill on rural local government produced the Rural Municipalities Ordinance of 1865, which transferred the secular functions of the church parishes to an independent civil municipality.

Liberal members had pressed demands that went further than the government's. Their proposals for a merchant flag and customs of Finland's own drew broad criticism in the Russian press against "the Swedish party" and the separatists of Helsinki, and awakened mistrust of the Grand Duchy's "Swedish" institutions. According to Max Engman, this contributed to Finland's position being secured only through the Diet Act of 1869, while plans for a new instrument of government were shelved.

The next Diet met in 1867 as promised, and the Diet Act of 1869 laid down that the Estates should meet at least every five years. That arrangement lasted until a unicameral parliament elected by universal suffrage replaced them in 1906.
