= Heikki Heikinpoika Vaanila =

Finnish politician (1630–1709)

Heikki Heikinpoika Vaanila (1630–1709) (Swedish: Hindrick Hindersson) was a Finnish farmer and parliamentarian from Vaanila village in Lohja, Uusimaa. He was chairman of the Estate of Swedish Peasants at the Swedish Riksdag of the Estates in 1680, which established absolute monarchy in Sweden and reduced the privileges of the Swedish nobility. He was also the chairman of the Finnish peasants at the States of Finland held in Turku in 1676. He was a member of the regency council during the minority of Charles XI of Sweden.
