= Mikhail Borovitinov =

Russian lawyer

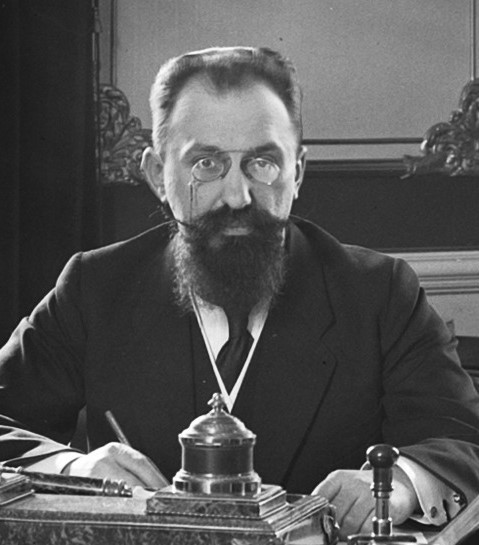
Mikhail Borovitinov in 1914

Mikhail Mikhailovich Borovitinov (Russian: Михаил Михайлович Боровитинов, 2 August 1874 in Saint Petersburg, Russia – died unknown) was a Russian lawyer and leader of the Russian Imperial Finnish Senate (Prime Minister of Finland) in the years 1913–1917, heading its Home Office.

Borovitinov received his law degree at the University of St. Petersburg in 1896. After that, he pursued post-graduate studies, serving in the Russian Ministry of Justice.

Borovitinov was member of the International Prison Congress held in Washington in 1910.

Mihail Borovitinov began his service in Finland 28 April 1911, when he moved to Finland as a Head of the Chancellery of the Governor-General of Finland Franz Albert Seyn. Seyn had such a high regard for Borovitinov that on 16 May 1913 he was made Vice-President of the Imperial Finnish Senate.

The service of both Borovitinov and Franz Albert Seyn ended with the arrival of news on 15 March 1917 of the abdication of Nicholas II of Russia. The next day, Seyn and Borovitinov were arrested and taken in custody by train to St. Petersburg. Borovitinov was freed in the autumn, and his subsequent fate is unknown.
