= Edvard Bergenheim =

Finnish archbishop

The Most Reverend Edvard Bergenheim
- Archbishop of Turku and Finland
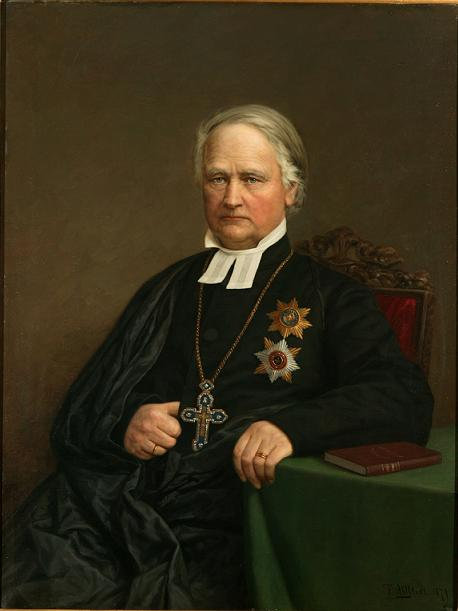
- Edvard Bergenheim (1879). Portrait by Fredrik Ahlstedt.
- Church: Evangelical Lutheran Church of Finland
- Archdiocese: Turku
- In office: 1850–1884
- Predecessor: Erik Gabriel Melartin
- Successor: Torsten Thure Renvall

Orders
- Ordination: December 1830
- Consecration: 24 May 1850 by Carl Gustaf Ottelin

Personal details
- Born: 18 September 1798 Vaasa, Kingdom of Sweden Present-day Finland
- Died: 19 February 1884 (aged 85) Turku, Grand Duchy of Finland, Russian Empire Present-day Finland
- Denomination: Lutheran
- Parents: Erik Johan Bergenheim & Hedvig Sofia Hannelius
- Spouse: Alexandrine Bruun
- Children: 10

Edvard Bergenheim, previously Bergenhem (18 September 1798 – 19 February 1884) was the Archbishop of Turku and the spiritual head of the Evangelical Lutheran Church of Finland between 1850 and 1884.

== Biography ==
Bergenheim was born on 18 September 1798 in Vaasa in the Kingdom of Sweden, the son of Erik Johan Bergenheim and Hedvig Sofia Hannelius. His father came from a Swedish family of clergymen, while his mother came from the Hannuksela peasant family and the Peldan family of clergymen. He graduated in 1817 with a Bachelor of Arts and in 1823 with a Master of Philosophy from Royal Academy of Turku. Bergenheim was a teacher at the Hamina Cadet School and taught history, geography and statistics. Bergenheim completed his theological studies in December 1830 and was ordained priest. He served as a lecturer, rector and second vice-rector of history at Turku High School between 1832 and 1844. In 1850 he was appointed Archbishop of Turku and was consecrated in Porvoo Cathedral on 24 May 1850. Bergenheim married Aleksandra Bruun in 1832. He was a member of the House of Nobility since 1837.

Titles in Lutheranism
Preceded by Erik Gabriel Melartin	Archbishop of Turku and Finland; 1850 – 1884	Succeeded by Torsten Thure Renvall
