= Carl Gustaf Ottelin =

Finnish bishop

The Right Reverend Carl Gustaf Ottelin
- Bishop of Porvoo
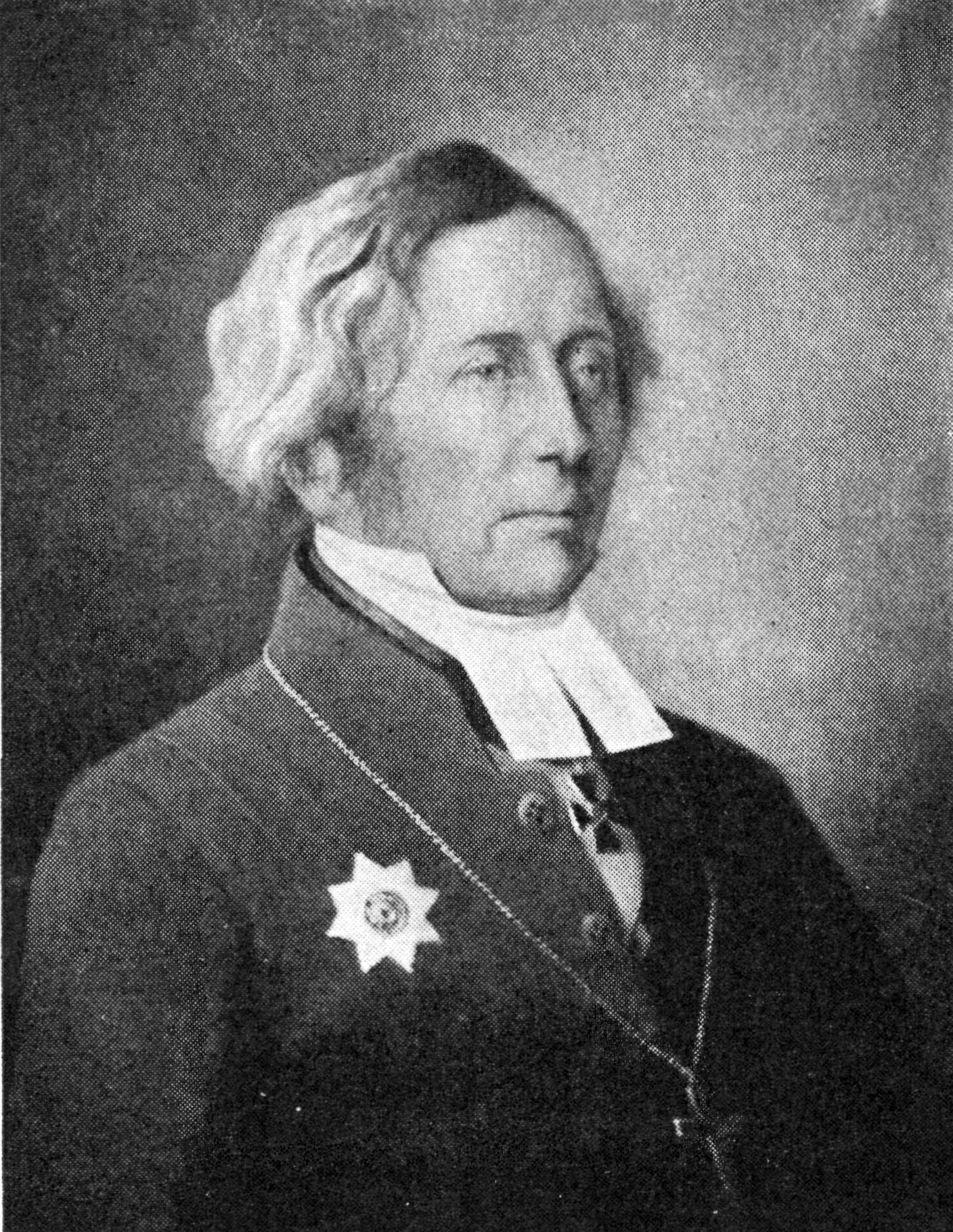
- Church: Evangelical Lutheran Church of Finland
- Diocese: Porvoo
- Appointed: 28 March 1838
- Predecessor: Johan Molander
- Successor: Frans Ludvig Schauman

Orders
- Ordination: 1822
- Consecration: June 1838 by Erik Gabriel Melartin

Personal details
- Born: 1 May 1793 Elimäki, Kingdom of Sweden Present-day Finland
- Died: 18 October 1864 (aged 71) Porvoo, Grand Duchy of Finland, Russian Empire Present-day Finland
- Parents: Adam Ottelin & Erika Johanna Ingman
- Spouse: Johanna Fredrika Carlsdotter Wallenstierna
- Children: 11

Carl Gustaf Ottelin (1 May 1793 – 18 October 1864) was a Finnish prelate who was Bishop of Porvoo from 1838 till 1864.

== Biography ==
Ottelin was born on 1 May 1793 in Elimäki in the Kingdom of Sweden. His parents were the commissioner Adam Ottelin and Johanna Ingman. He first studied in Turku. In 1812, he learned Russian with Erik Gustaf Ehrström and in 1814 published a Russian grammar book. That same year he also earned his Master of Philosophy. In 1816, he published De Fide religiosa, a book intended for the Docent, which was rejected by Anders Johan Lagus.

Ottelin served as a lecturer at the Porvoo High School from 1816 to 1831 and taught Russian and mathematics. He was ordained a priest in 1822, and he received his doctorate in theology in 1830. After becoming the vicar of Vyborg, he was appointed by Tsar Nicholas I as Bishop of Porvoo on 28 March 1838. He was consecrated in June of the same year by Archbishop Erik Gabriel Melartin in Turku Cathedral. He was installed and given imperial decree to commence his episcopacy on 1 October 1838. Ottelin's wife was Johanna Frederika Wallenstjerna whom he married in 1819.
