= Anders Henrik Falck =

Finnish politician

Anders Henrik Falck (25 November 1772 – 30 November 1851) was a Finnish politician.

Falck was born in Kerimäki. He was a Vice-Chairman the economic division of the Senate of Finland (1828–1833). He died in Kauttua.
