= Anders Wirenius =

Finnish politician (1850–1919)

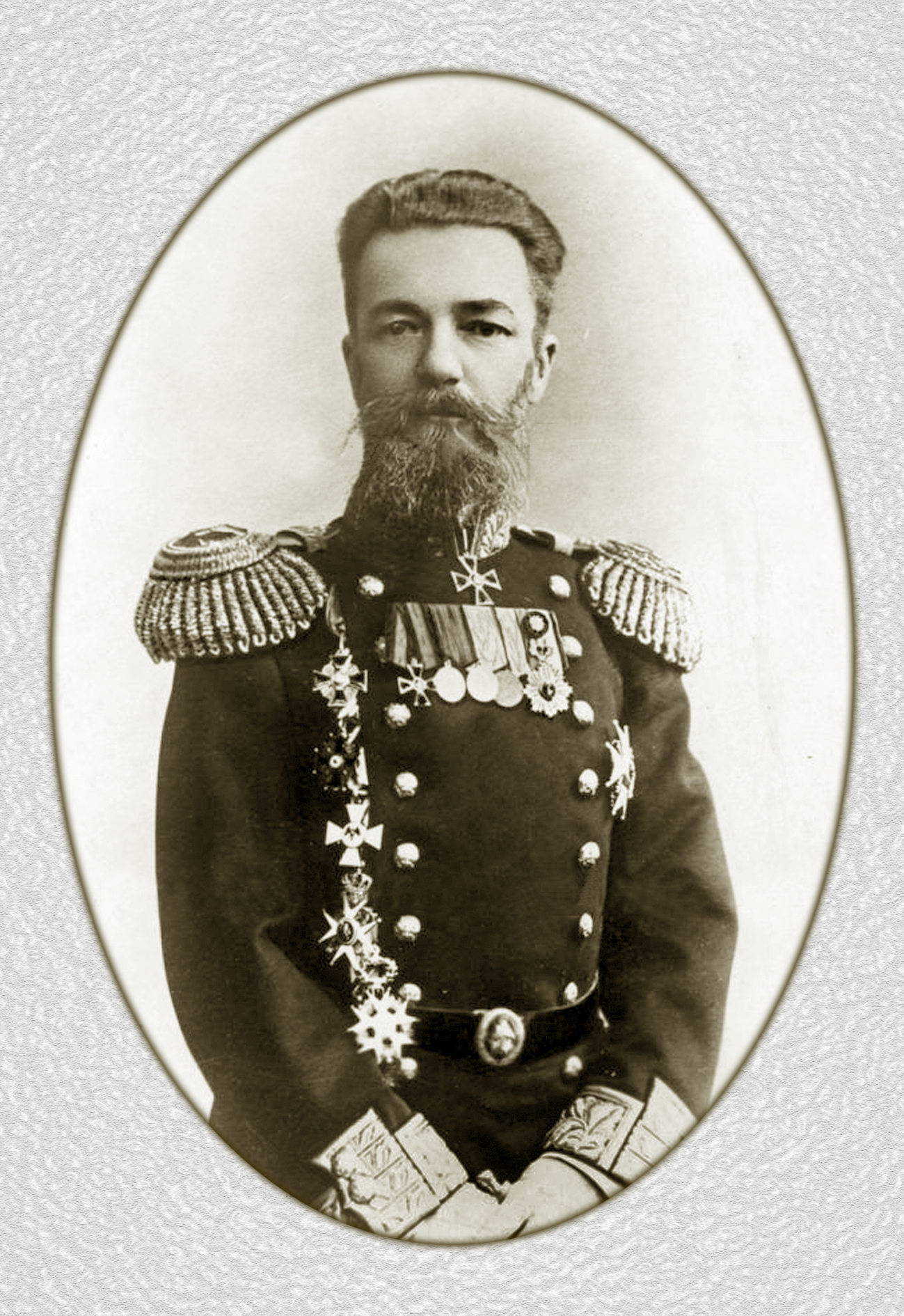
Anders Wirenius

Anders Wirenius (29 April 1850 – 29 August 1919) was a Finnish politician. Born in Saint Petersburg, he was twice vice-chairman of the Home Office of the Senate of Finland in 1909 and in 1917, and was acting chairman of the Senate from 15 to 26 March 1917, at which point Finland declared its independence. Wirenius was also a vice admiral in the Imperial Russian Navy.
