= Thorsten Renvall =

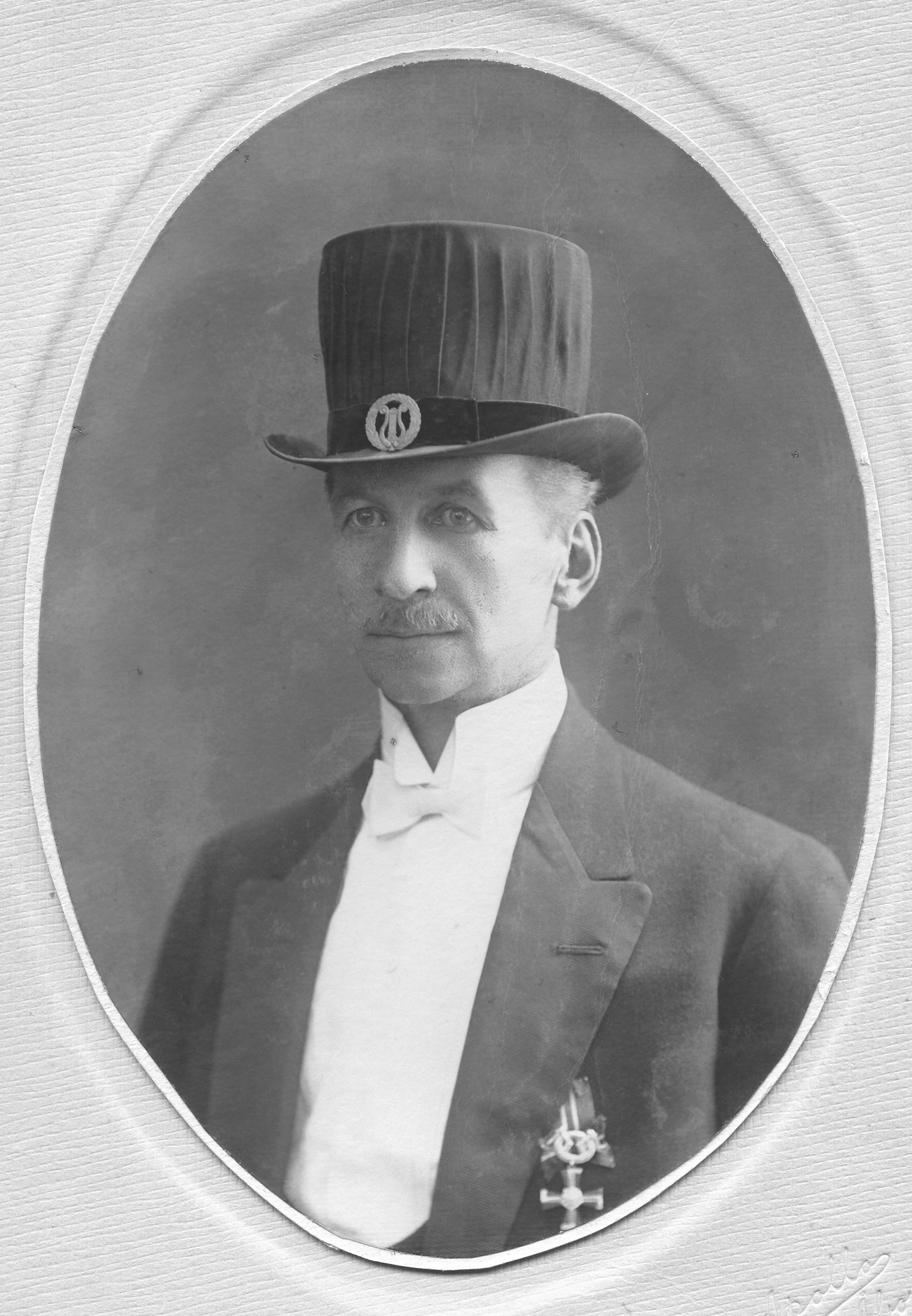
Renvall in 1911

Klas Thorsten Gustaf Renvall (13 March 1868 – 5 November 1927) was a Finnish naturalist and noble. He was among the first to produce a field guide to the birds of Finland and was a pioneer of conservation in the region.

Renvall was born in Turku, the son of Archbishop Torsten Thure Renvall and Amanda Sofia Limnell (1837-1915). His brother Heikki Renvall became a senator. Renvall graduated from the University of Turku in 1888 and received a degree in philosophy and a doctorate from the University of Helsinki in 1911. He made trips to Egypt to collect natural history specimens and was a lecturer at the Swedish Lyceum in Helsinki until 1927. In 1918 he participated in the Finnish civil war as part of the Uusikaupunki Civil Guard and led a campaign to Petsamo to examine the borders of Finland and Lapland. The contingent of 250 people was called the "Lapland Jaegers" and included the artist Jalmari Ruokokoski. The expedition had several casualties and they returned in July 1918. He was married twice, first to Harriet Clara von Platen with whom they had three children, and then with Anna Agneta Karlsson. He acquired a villa at the foot of Kelhinharju in 1908 and spent his summers there. This was not far from the villa owned by K.E. Kivirikko.

Renvall was a founding member of the Turku Society for the protection of animals. He produced some of the first field guides to the fauna of the region. He established habitat descriptions and classifications for the region. At a time when the destruction of birds of prey was rewarded, he pointed out the value of predators in keeping rodents in check. His book Suomen Retkeilyfauna (1916, "Finland's hiking fauna") was among the first guides to the birds and animals of the region.
