= Joachim Kurtén =

Finnish businessman (1836–1899)

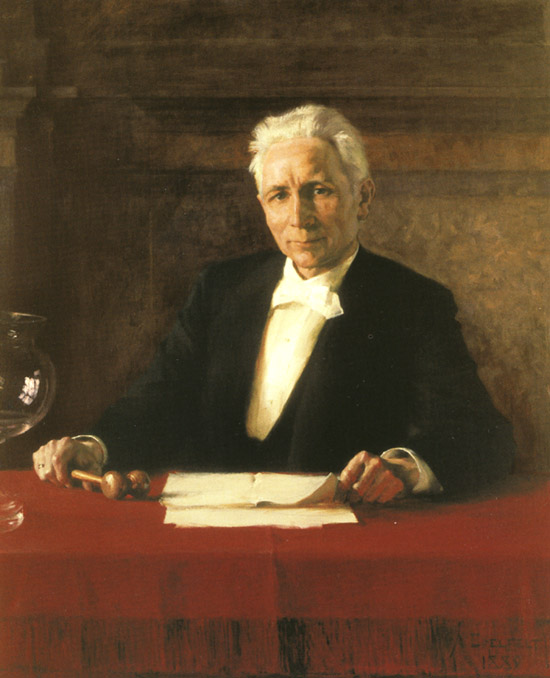
Joachim Kurtén

Anders Joachim Kurtén (15 January 1836 – 28 June 1899) was a Finnish businessman. He rose to prominence in Vaasa, where he established multiple companies and had a distinguished career in banking.

== Life ==
Kurtén was born in Kronoby into the family of sea captain Henrik Kurtén. In 1841, the family moved to Vaasa where he finished his upper-secondary final examination at the age of 17. He went on to study at a business college in Turku after which he went to work as a clerk for businessman A. A. Levón back in Vaasa. In 1861, he became Levóns business partner.

Kurtén became a prominent figure in Vaasa, where he founded several companies and had a distinguished career in banking. He chaired the city council for almost twenty years and was the speaker of the Burghers in Finland's then legislature, the four-estates Diet.

The fact that the railroad extends to Vaasa is supposed to be the work of Kurtén.
