= Torsten Thure Renvall =

Finnish archbishop (1817–1898)

The Most Reverend Torsten Thure Renvall
- Archbishop of Turku and Finland
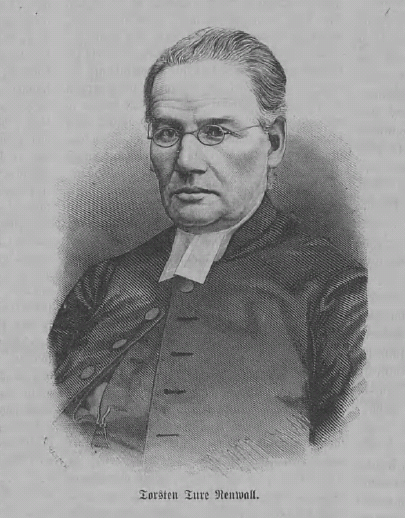
- Church: Evangelical Lutheran Church of Finland
- Archdiocese: Turku
- In office: 1884–1898
- Predecessor: Edvard Bergenheim
- Successor: Gustaf Johansson

Orders
- Ordination: 1857
- Consecration: 1884

Personal details
- Born: October 23, 1817 Turku, Grand Duchy of Finland, Russian Empire Present-day Finland
- Died: October 16, 1898 (aged 80) Turku, Grand Duchy of Finland, Russian Empire Present-day Finland
- Denomination: Lutheran
- Parents: Henrik Renvall & Agneta Cornelia Cairenius
- Spouse: Emilia Maria Lovisa Bergenstråle; Amanda Sofia Limnell
- Children: 13

Torsten Thure Renvall (23 October 1817 – 16 October 1898) was a Finnish clergyman who was the Archbishop of Turku, and the spiritual head of the Evangelical Lutheran Church of Finland between 1884 and 1898.

== Biography ==
Renvall was born on October 23, 1817, in Turku, the son of Henrik Renvall and Agneta Cornelia Cairenius. He graduated with a Bachelor of Philosophy in 1840 and as a Docent in History in 1845. He taught history in Vaasa high school from 1845 to 1851 and then at Turku high school from 1852 till 1858. Between 1846 and 1847, he contributed to the Vasabladet and founded the Ilmarinen magazine in Finnish between 1848 and 1850. He was ordained a priest in 1857. Among others, Renvall participated in the reform of the Church Act and was a member of the January Committee of 1862. He received the Doctor of Theology in 1864. He served as Dean of Turku between 1858 and 1884.

In 1884, he was appointed Archbishop of Turku. However, due to the fact that all the Finnish bishops had died there was no available bishop to consecrate Renvall. As Finland was then an autonomous Grand Duchy under Russian rule, it was politically impossible to obtain a foreign bishop for consecrations. Hence, the oldest theological professor, Axel Fredrik Granfelt, was commissioned to consecrate the new archbishop. This in turn broke the apostolic succession which was brought into the Finnish Church by its mother church, the Church of Sweden. The apostolic succession was reinstated in the Finnish church in 1934 through the consecration of Aleksi Lehtonen who was co-consecrated by the Archbishop of Uppsala Erling Eidem.

Renvall married Emilia Maria Lovisa Bergenstråle, in 1843 and secondly in 1865 to Amanda Sofia Limnell. His son Klas Thorsten Gustaf Renvall (1868–1927) from his second wife became a naturalist.

== Publications ==
- Dc M. Porcio Catone Censorio commentario (1845)
- Om rättfärdiggörelsen (1875)
- Tal vid Hans Majestät Kejsar Alexander II :s 25-åriga regeringsjubileum den 2 mars 1880 (1880)
- Ord uttalade vid sorgegudstjensten i Åbo domkyrka den 18 mars 1881 och predikan hållen i Åbo domkyrka allmänna klagodagen den 31 maj 1881 med anledning af H.M. Kejsaren-Storfursten Alexander II:s den 13 mars 1881 timade dödliga frånfälle (1881)
- Själfbiografiska anteckningar af Torsten T. Renvall (1917)
- Torsten T. Renvalls bref till sin son (1917)

Titles in Lutheranism
| Preceded by Edvard Bergenheim | Archbishop of Turku and Finland; 1884 – 1898 | Succeeded by Gustaf Johansson |
