= Senate of Finland =

Historical government body in Finland from 1809 to 1918

Imperial Senate of Finland
- Kejserliga senaten för Finland (Swedish); Keisarillinen Suomen senaatti (Finnish); Императорский Финский Сенат (Russian)
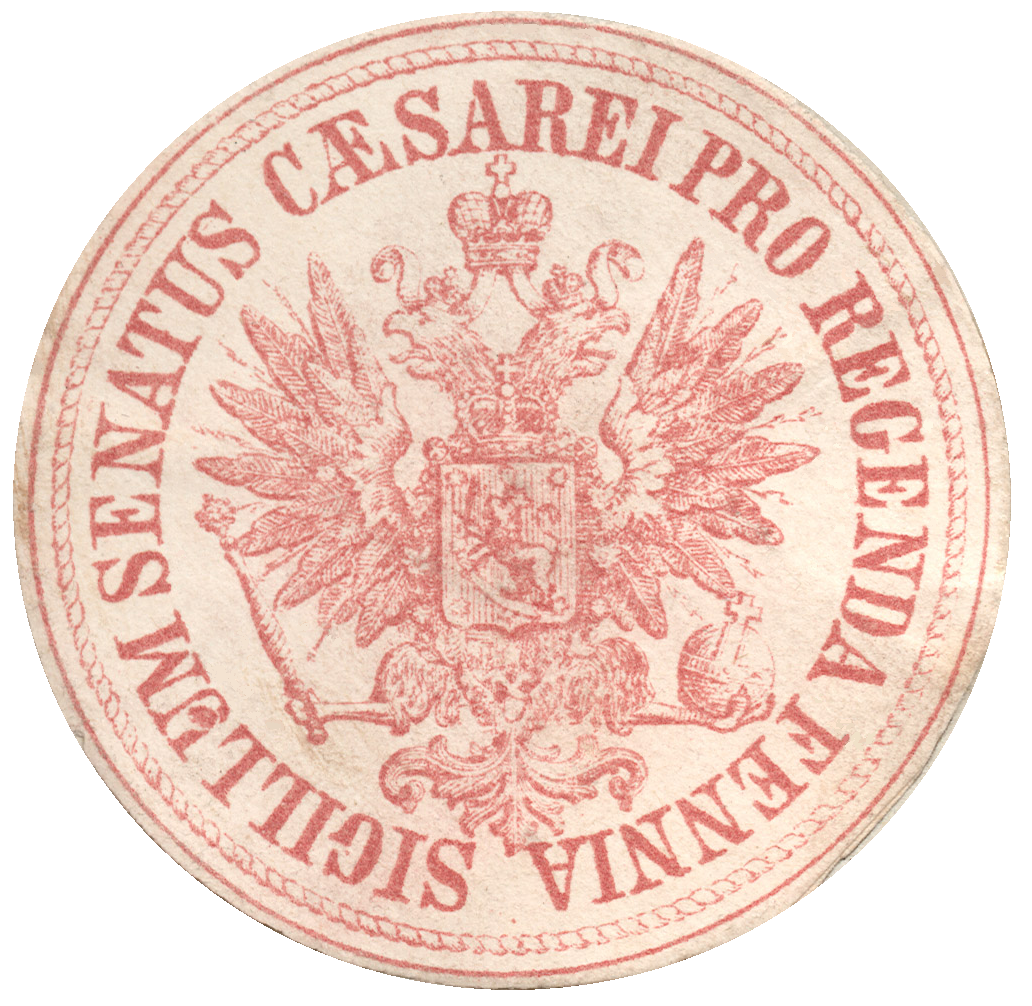
- The Senate's paper seal, used 1809–1918

Agency overview
- Formed: 18 August 1809
- Dissolved: 27 November 1918; 107 years ago
- Superseding agencies: Finnish Government; Supreme Court; Supreme Administrative Court
- Type: Supreme governing body and supreme court of the Grand Duchy of Finland
- Jurisdiction: Finland
- Headquarters: Turku 1809–1819 Senate House, Senate Square, Helsinki, from 1819
- Agency executives: Governor-General (to 1917), Chairman; de facto head of government from 1822, Vice-Chairman, Economic Division; Procurator, Legality oversight

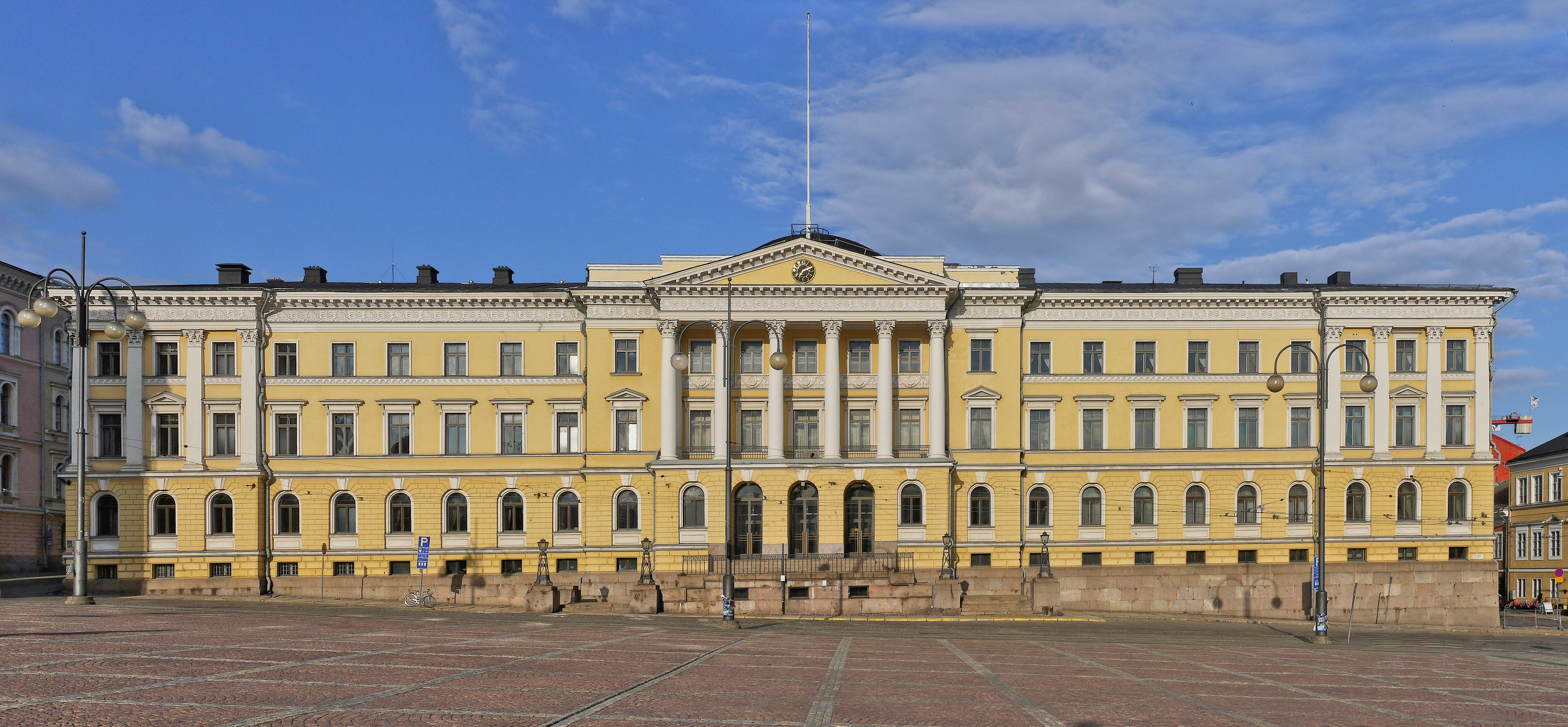
The Senate building at the Senate Square in central Helsinki

The Senate of Finland (Swedish: Senaten för Finland; Finnish: Suomen senaatti) combined the functions of cabinet and supreme court in the Grand Duchy of Finland and, from 1917, in independent Finland. It was established in 1809 as the Governing Council of the Grand Duchy of Finland (Regeringskonseljen för Storfurstendömet Finland), renamed the Imperial Senate of Finland (Kejserliga senaten för Finland) in 1816, and dissolved in 1918.

The Senate was the government in Finland of the Russian emperor, who as the country's ruler bore the title of Grand Duke. It was divided into two divisions: the Judicial Division was the country's supreme court, while the Economic Division was its government and conducted the general administration through its expeditions, the forerunners of the ministries. The Governor-General was formally its chairman, but he seldom exercised the office—not least because the Senate deliberated in Swedish—and from 1822 each division was in practice led by a vice-chairman of its own. The vice-chairman of the Economic Division was the country's unofficial prime minister, and until the end of the 1890s he also took the chair when the two divisions sat together. The senators, as the members were called from 1857, were appointed by the emperor for three years at a time and answered to him alone; there was no parliamentary responsibility to the Diet until 1917.

After the February Revolution of 1917 the senators of the Economic Division were made answerable to the Diet, and on 6 December that year Pehr Evind Svinhufvud's senate declared the country independent. In 1918 the Judicial Division was reconstituted as the Supreme Court and a new Supreme Administrative Court took over the administrative appeals previously decided in the Economic Division, and on 27 November of that year the Senate was renamed the Government, its expeditions becoming ministries and its senators ministers.

== Establishment ==
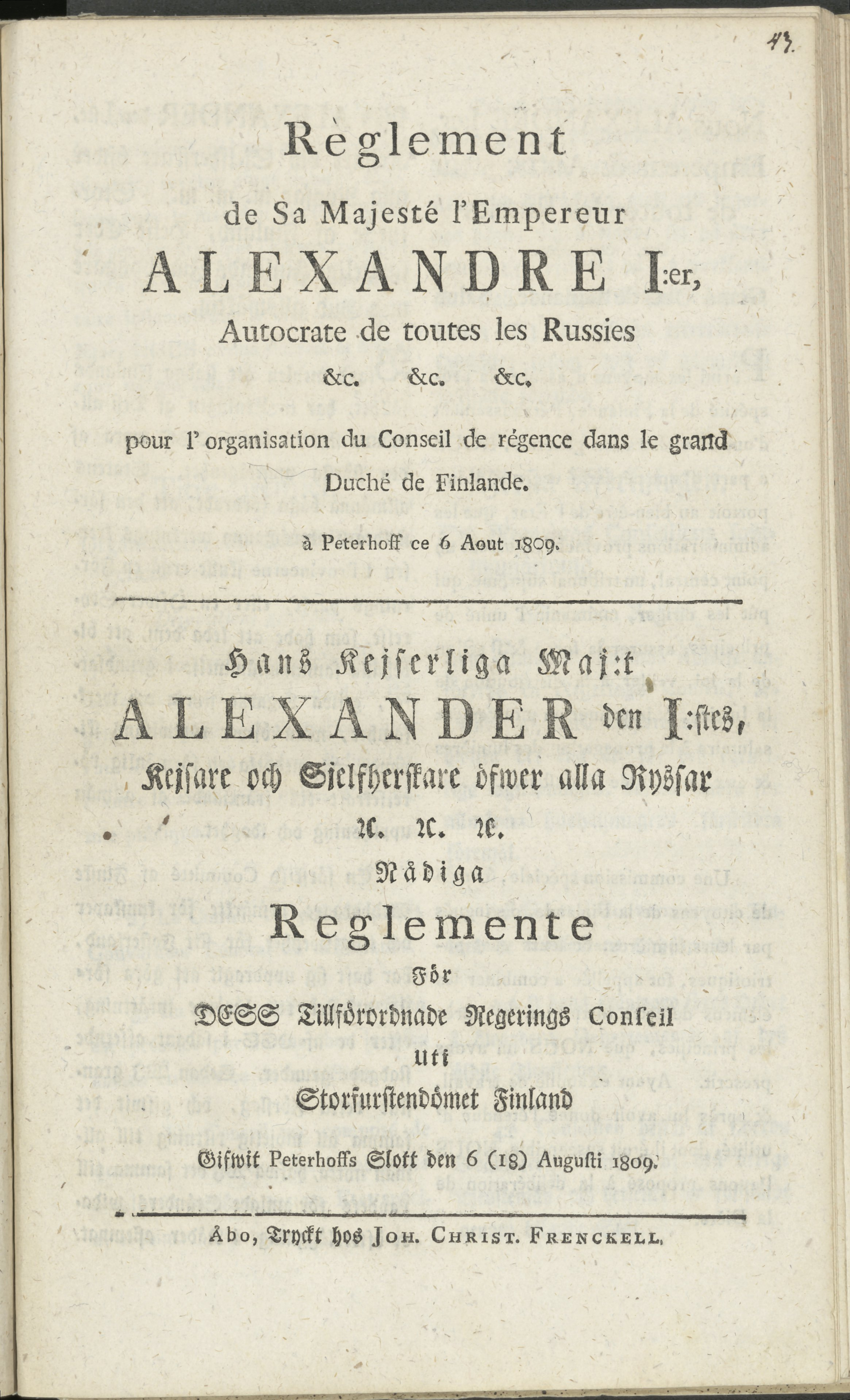
Title page of Alexander I's regulations for the Governing Council, confirmed at Peterhof on 6 (18) August 1809 and printed in Turku

When Finland was joined to Russia in 1809, a new central administration had to be created in the country. Under Swedish rule the central administration had been located in Stockholm, while only the provincial and local administration lay in Finland. In the Treaty of Fredrikshamn of the same year Alexander I was styled, among much else, "Grand Duke of Smolensk, Lithuania, Volhynia, Podolia and Finland"; Meinander cites this long list of titles as evidence that the emperor did not intend the Grand Duchy to hold a specially autonomous position. Much of the Swedish administrative practice continued to apply in the Grand Duchy, which was joined to the empire but never integrated into it.

When Göran Magnus Sprengtporten was appointed Governor-General in December 1808, he drew up a proposal for a Finnish governing council that was unambiguously subordinate to his own office. Sprengtporten was replaced in the summer of 1809 by General Michael Andreas Barclay de Tolly, who had previously opposed a separate Finnish council but as Governor-General came to see the advantage of administering the country through one. The regulations for the council were drafted ahead of the Diet of Porvoo by a Finnish committee led by the bishop of Turku, Jakob Tengström, and were confirmed by the emperor in August 1809.

The regulations showed the clear influence of the Russian minister Mikhail Speransky and contained two arrangements that shifted power from the Governor-General to the council. Speransky had already been given the task in 1808 of presenting Finnish affairs to the emperor directly, bypassing the Governor-General, and he ensured that this arrangement was written into the regulations; when his workload grew too heavy, a separate Finnish office of state secretary—later the Minister–State Secretary—was established in 1811. The Governor-General was further denied a vote in civil matters, which covered a large part of the country's administration. This division of labour was reinforced in 1812 by a separate instruction for the office of Governor-General.

Under the regulations the council consisted of fourteen members appointed by the emperor, with the Governor-General as its chairman. It was divided into a Judicial Division, responsible for the administration of justice, and an Economic Division, which handled civil government and the general economy; the latter was subdivided into five expeditions, or administrative departments—the Chancellery, Finance, Chamber and Accounts, Military and Ecclesiastical Expeditions. The council worked under the supervision of the Procurator.

In 1816, Alexander renamed the body the Senate to demonstrate that it was equal to rather than inferior to its Russian equivalent. The institution bore three formal names during its existence: the Governing Council of the Grand Duchy of Finland (Regeringskonseljen för Storfurstendömet Finland) in 1809–1816, the Imperial Senate of Finland (Kejserliga senaten för Finland) in 1816–1917, and the Senate of Finland (Senaten för Finland) in 1918.

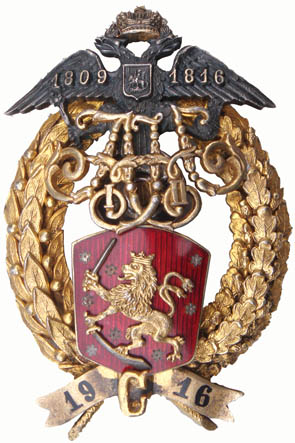
The coat of arms of the Imperial Finnish Senate

The Senate initially sat in Turku. Helsinki was declared the capital of the Grand Duchy by imperial rescript in 1812, but the decision stipulated that the Governor-General and the Senate were to remain in Turku until public buildings had been erected for them. The Senate was nonetheless moved to Helsinki by imperial proclamation in 1817, and its work there began on 1 October 1819. Construction of the Senate House, designed by Carl Ludvig Engel on the eastern side of Senate Square, had begun in 1818; the Senate Square wing was first used in 1822, and the block was not enclosed until 1853.

== Organisation and working methods ==
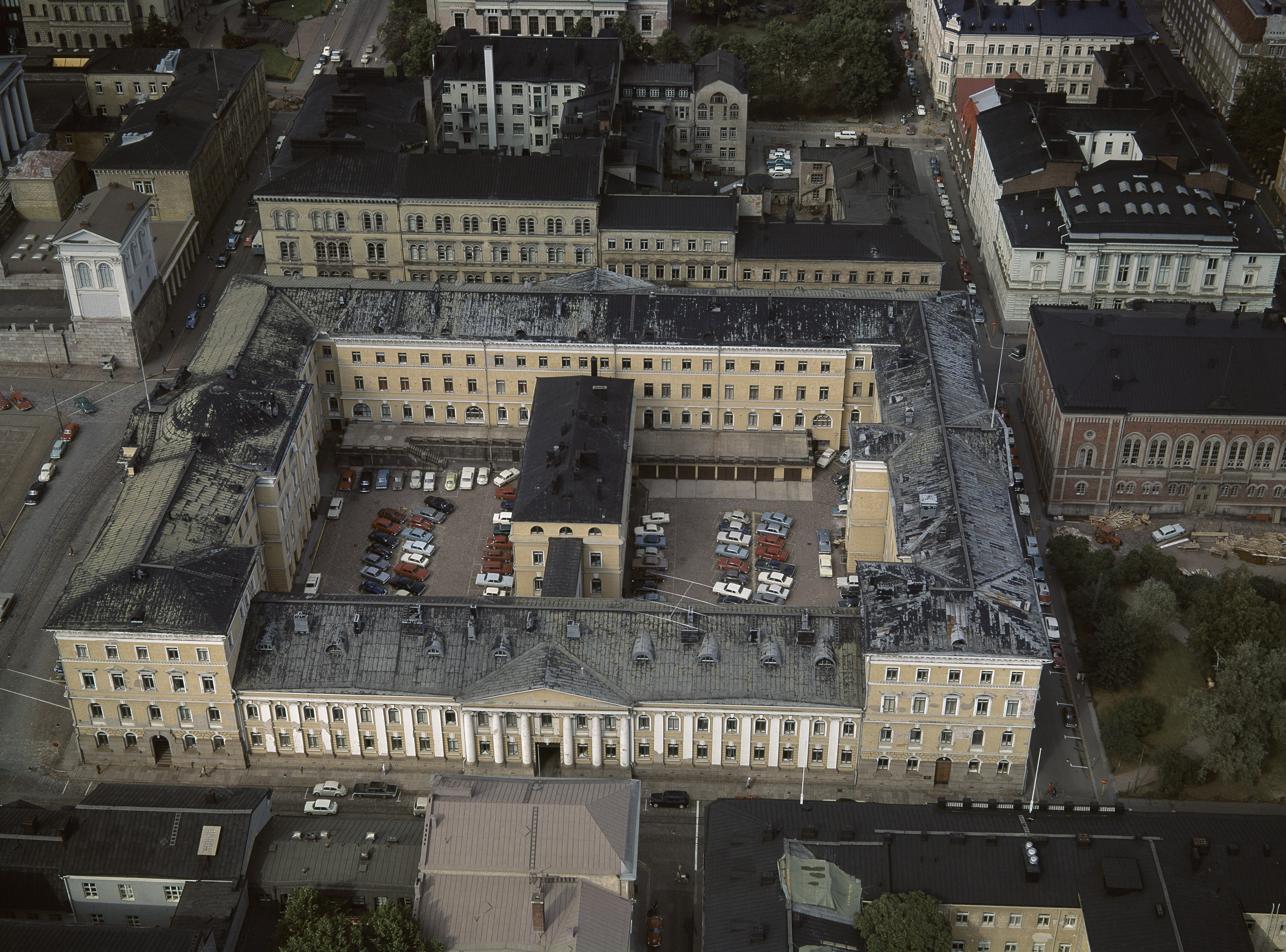
The Senate House at Senate Square in Helsinki, seen from the air in the 1960s. The block, completed in 1853, housed both divisions of the Senate and their expeditions.

=== Divisions and expeditions ===
The Senate consisted of two divisions: the Judicial Division for court matters and the Economic Division for general administration. It was thus at once the country's government and its supreme court—two tasks that in independent Finland came to be carried out by separate institutions. The Economic Division was in turn divided into expeditions, each headed by a senator; their number varied between five and nine, and in 1918 they were reconstituted as the country's ministries. The Judicial Division had no subordinate expeditions. The Senate had oversight of the provincial and district administration, the courts of appeal, the Supreme Court Martial, the consistories and the central agencies as these came into being.

=== Membership and appointment ===
The members, called senators from 1857 and numbering at least ten in each division, were appointed for three years at a time by the emperor, who also appointed the vice-chairmen of the divisions. Appointment was made through a senate octroi, an imperial warrant renewed every three years.

The Senate met partly in plenum with both divisions together, partly by division and by section within a division. Matters to be laid before the Diet were dealt with in plenum, as were certain other important questions; if the majority of the Senate in plenum opposed the Governor-General's view, the final decision rested with the emperor. In routine matters the Senate decided in the emperor's name, and only weightier matters were referred to him personally. The Senate had no parliamentary responsibility to the Diet; senators answered to the emperor alone.

=== Chairmanship ===
As the grand duke's deputy, the Governor-General was the Senate's chairman, but he seldom took part in the preparatory handling of business. According to Max Engman he seldom exercised the office at all, "not least because the proceedings were conducted in Swedish". Only the first two governors-general, Barclay de Tolly and Fabian Steinheil, presided at the Senate's sittings, and even then they conducted proceedings in French. Until 1822 the Governor-General's deputy was the senator longest in service; thereafter there were two vice-chairmen, one for the Economic Division and one for the Judicial Division, and in practice these came to direct the work of their divisions. The vice-chairman of the Economic Division was the country's unofficial prime minister; because he was simultaneously vice-chairman of the Senate as a whole, and because its proceedings were conducted in Swedish, he also presided in plenum until the end of the 1890s.

The Grand Duchy's central administration thus had two centres. The Governor-General's chancellery was staffed by Russian-speaking officials, while the Senate's members were recruited among officials from Swedish-speaking Finland who knew no Russian. That Finland obtained so large a measure of administrative independence was probably due to the lack of competent Russian officials who commanded Swedish, which remained the language of administration.

=== The Procurator ===
Attached to the Senate was a Procurator appointed by the emperor, whose task was to oversee the legality of the courts and the administration. Reporting directly to the Governor-General, he attended the sittings of the Senate and of the courts and examined their minutes, and he was also the country's highest prosecuting authority. After 1892 he headed the Procurator's Expedition and could report irregularities in the administration directly to the emperor.

== 1917–1918 ==
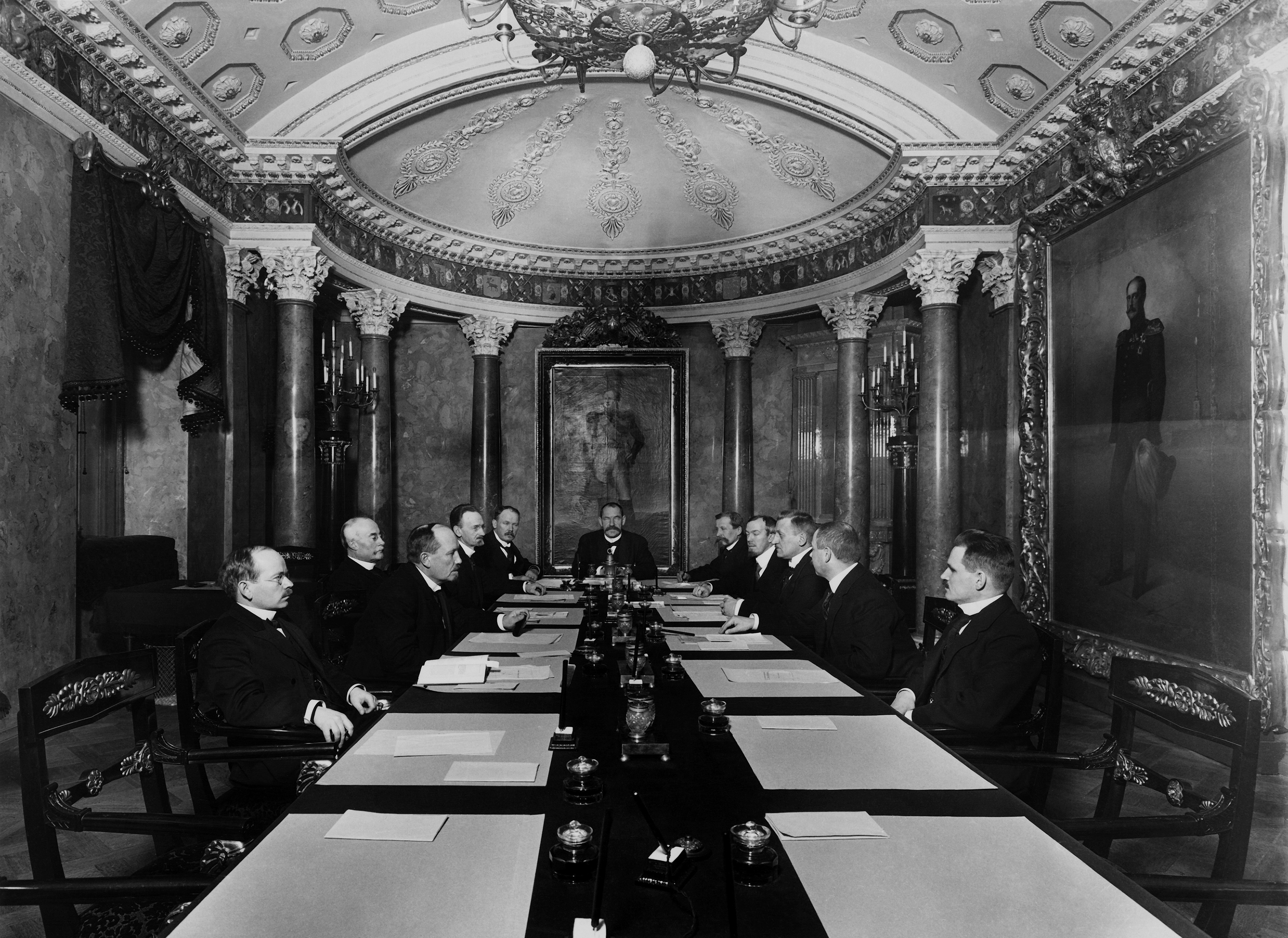
Svinhufvud's Senate in session on 4 December 1917, days before the declaration of independence. Svinhufvud is seated at the head of the table.

Emperor Nicholas II was forced to abdicate in March 1917 as a result of the revolution in Russia, and the autocratic monarchy was replaced by a provisional government, which in Finland had a manifesto proclaimed repealing all measures of integration taken since 1899. At the same time substantial changes were made to the Senate's position: the senators of the Economic Division were made answerable to the Diet—that is, parliamentarism was introduced—and members were thereafter appointed for an indefinite period instead of three years at a time. The statutory change establishing parliamentary responsibility took effect on 31 December 1917, although the system had in practice operated since the March revolution.

Responsibility for forming a senate passed to the parties in the Diet, and the Tokoi Senate, appointed on 26 March 1917 and made up of six Social Democrats and six non-socialists with Oskari Tokoi as vice-chairman of the Economic Division, has been described as the world's first socialist-led government.

The question of where supreme power lay after the emperor's fall divided the Senate. On 18 July 1917 the Diet approved the Power Act, which stripped the Russian provisional government of the right to decide in all matters except foreign policy and military affairs. The Russian government, which was trying to hold the empire together, rejected this and dissolved the Diet of Finland. Tokoi resigned in August and was succeeded by E. N. Setälä, whose senate was the last under the Russian provisional government. On 15 November 1917 the Diet declared that it was assuming all imperial power without exception.

The Senate thereby took over all the business of government in Finland, and on 6 December Pehr Evind Svinhufvud's senate declared the country independent. The decision was dictated above all by the non-socialist senate's fears that the Russian revolution was spreading to Finland.

On the evening of 27 January 1918 the Red Guards seized power in southern Finland and ordered the arrest of the non-socialist senate, which escaped. During the Civil War the Whites held their strongest position in Ostrobothnia and established their political headquarters in the coastal town of Vaasa, where the Senate sat from 29 January to 3 May 1918. Shortly after the end of the war a new senate was formed under the leadership of J. K. Paasikivi of the Finnish Party.

== Dissolution and successors ==
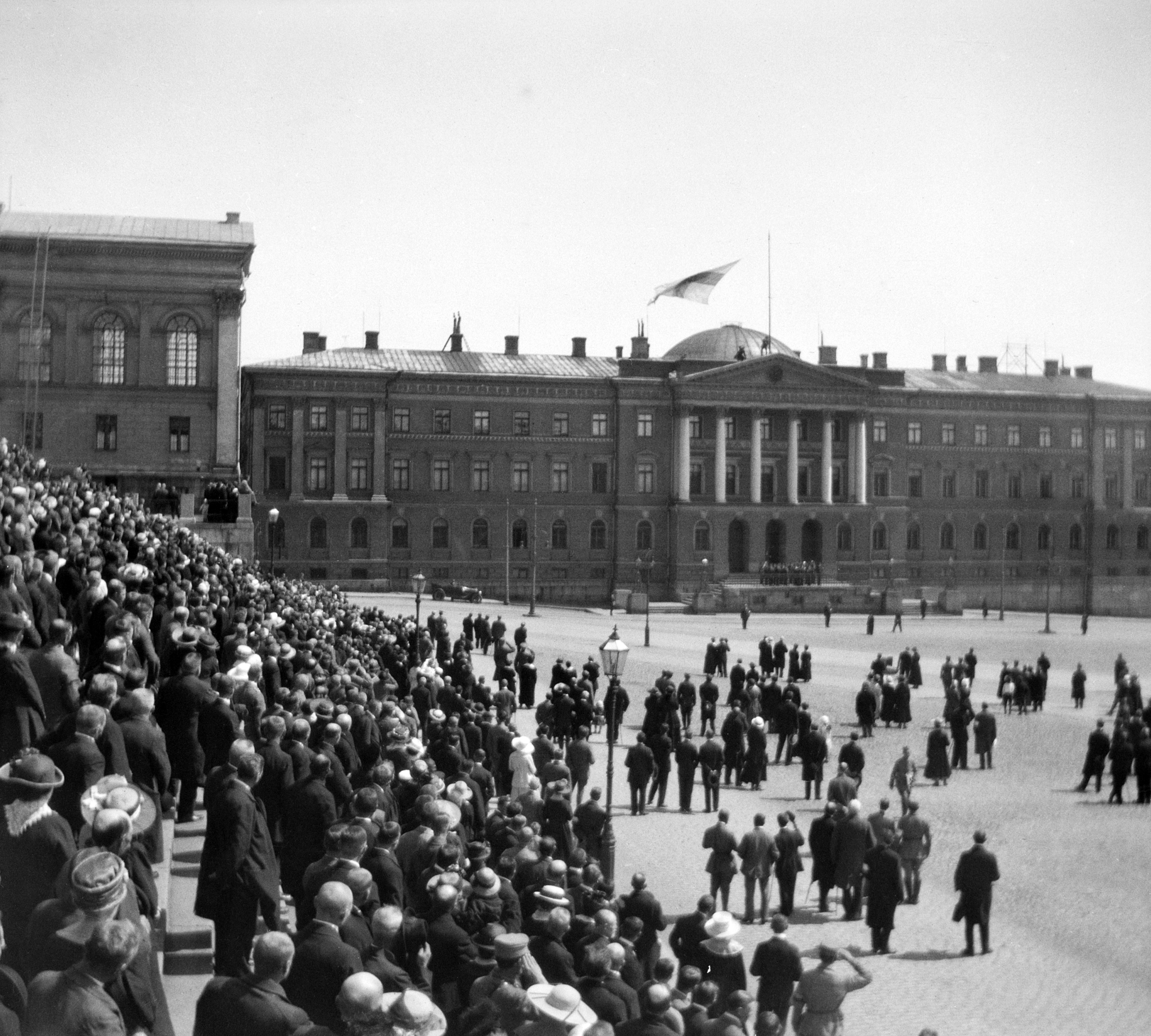
The flag of Finland is raised on the roof of the Senate House on 16 June 1918. The Senate sat in the building until November of that year, when it was reconstituted as the Government.

The Judicial Division was separated from the Senate in 1918 and reconstituted as the Supreme Court, established by the Act on the Supreme Court of 22 July 1918. At the same time the Supreme Administrative Court was established, to which were transferred the administrative appeals previously decided in the Economic Division; administrative jurisdiction had been one of that division's tasks ever since 1809.

On 27 November 1918 the Senate's name was changed to the Government (statsrådet; valtioneuvosto) and the expeditions were renamed ministries. The senators became ministers, the vice-chairman of the Economic Division became Prime Minister, the Senate Chancery became the Prime Minister's Office, and the Procurator became the Chancellor of Justice. Alongside the Prime Minister's Office, independent Finland began with eleven ministries. Independent Finland's first Form of Government was adopted the following year, in 1919, when the representative assembly also changed its name from the Diet to the Parliament.

== Vice-chairmen of the Economic Division (1822–1917) ==
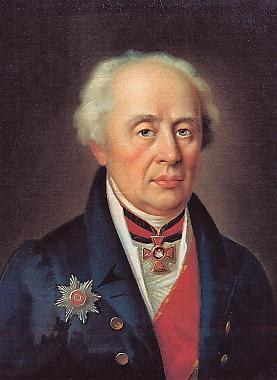
Count Carl Erik Mannerheim (1759–1837), the first vice-chairman of the Economic Division and thus, in effect, the first head of the Finnish government

- Carl Erik Mannerheim, (1822–1826)
- Samuel Fredrik von Born (acting), (1826–1828)
- Anders Henrik Falck, (1828–1833)
- Gustaf Hjärne, (1833–1841)
- Lars Gabriel von Haartman, (1841–1858)
- Johan Mauritz Nordenstam, (1858–1882)
- Edvard Gustaf af Forselles, (1882–1885)
- Samuel Werner von Troil, (1885–1891)
- Sten Carl Tudeer, (1891–1900)
- Constantin Linder, (1900–1905)
- Emil Streng, (1905)
- Leopold Henrik Stanislaus Mechelin, (1905–1908)
- Edvard Immanuel Hjelt, (1908–1909)
- August Johannes Hjelt, (1909)
- Anders Wirenius, (1909)
- Vladimir Ivanovich Markov, (1909–1913)
- Mikhail Borovitinov, (1913–1917)
- Anders Wirenius (acting), (1917)
- Oskari Tokoi, Social Democratic Party (1917)
- E. N. Setälä, Young Finnish Party (1917)

== Chairmen of the Senate (1917–1918) ==
- Pehr Evind Svinhufvud, Young Finnish Party (1917–1918)
- Juho Kusti Paasikivi, Finnish Party (1918)

== See also ==
- Diet of Finland
- Governor-General of Finland
- List of prime ministers of Finland
