= Gustaf Johansson (bishop) =

Finnish archbishop of Turku (1844–1930)

The Most Reverend Gustaf Johansson
- Archbishop of Turku and Finland
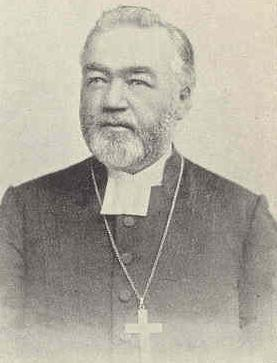
- Church: Evangelical Lutheran Church of Finland
- Archdiocese: Turku
- In office: 1899–1930
- Predecessor: Torsten Thure Renvall
- Successor: Lauri Ingman
- Previous posts: Bishop of Kuopio (1885-1897); Bishop of Savonlinna (1897-1899)

Orders
- Ordination: 1871
- Consecration: 1885

Personal details
- Born: 10 January 1844 Ylivieska, Grand Duchy of Finland, Russian Empire Present-day Finland
- Died: 29 July 1930 (aged 86) Turku, Finland
- Denomination: Lutheran
- Parents: Gustaf Johansson & Johanna Emilia Schalin
- Spouse: Sofia Emelie Björkman
- Children: 10

Gustaf Johansson (10 January 1844 – 24 July 1930) was the Archbishop of Turku, and the spiritual head of the Evangelical Lutheran Church of Finland between 1899 and 1930.

== Biography ==
Johansson was born in Ylivieska. He was ordained a priest in 1871 and graduated with a Bachelor of Theology in 1874 . He served as a Professor of Dogmatics and Ethics at the University of Helsinki between 1877 and 1885. As a professor, Johansson developed terminology in his field by creating Finnish-language responses to many theological words. He served as Bishop of Kuopio between 1885 and 1897 and later became Bishop of Savonlinna where he remained till 1899. In 1899 he was appointed Archbishop of Turku. As a bishop, he led Bible Translation Committee between 1886 and 1912 and participated in the Finnish and Swedish-language hymnal reform. He died in Turku, aged 86.

Titles in Lutheranism
Preceded by Torsten Thure Renvall	Archbishop of Turku and Finland; 1899 – 1930	Succeeded by Lauri Ingman
