= August Alexander Levón =

Sculpture of Levón at University of Vaasa, parts of which are housed in his 1856 cotton mill

August Alexander Levón (14 November 1820 – 30 August 1875) was a Finnish businessman. He started Finland's first steam-powered mill which first focused on milling rye for bread producers, in 1849. This mill was the beginning of Vaasan & Vaasan, the biggest bakery business in Finland and the Baltic region, one of the largest crisp bread producers in the world and a significant Nordic producer of bake-off products.

Levón was born in Raahe. The original name of his family was Leinonen. He came to Vaasa at the age of 19 and started to work at a pharmacy. He wanted to start his own pharmacy in the town but did not get the permission to do so. Instead of continuing with the pharmacy he became an industrialist.

Levón went on to found a cotton factory and a shipping company. His contribution to the industrial progress of Vaasa and Finland is very significant.
