= Kaarle Ojanen (politician) =

Finnish farmer and politician (1851–1927)

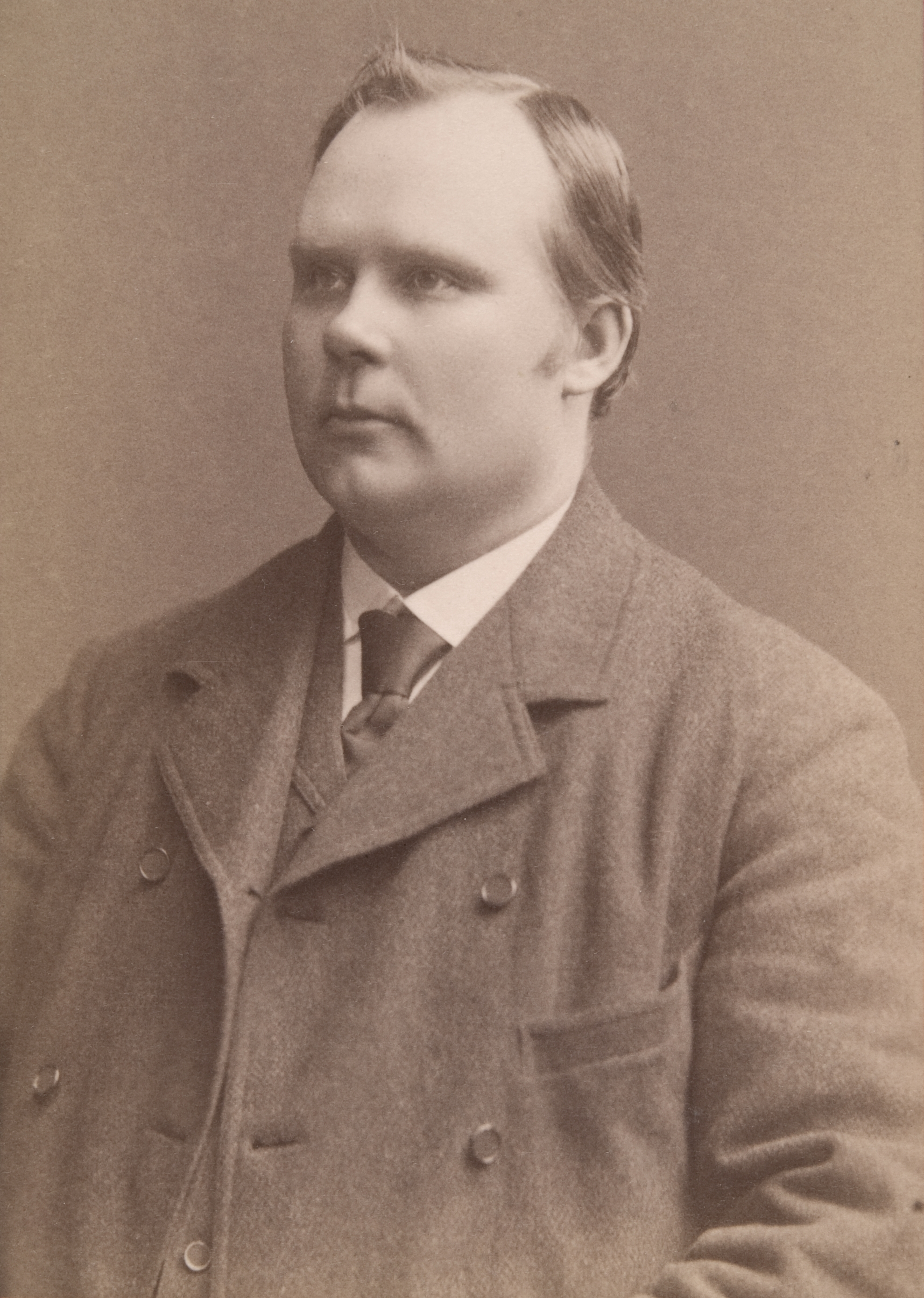
Kaarle Ojanen in 1882

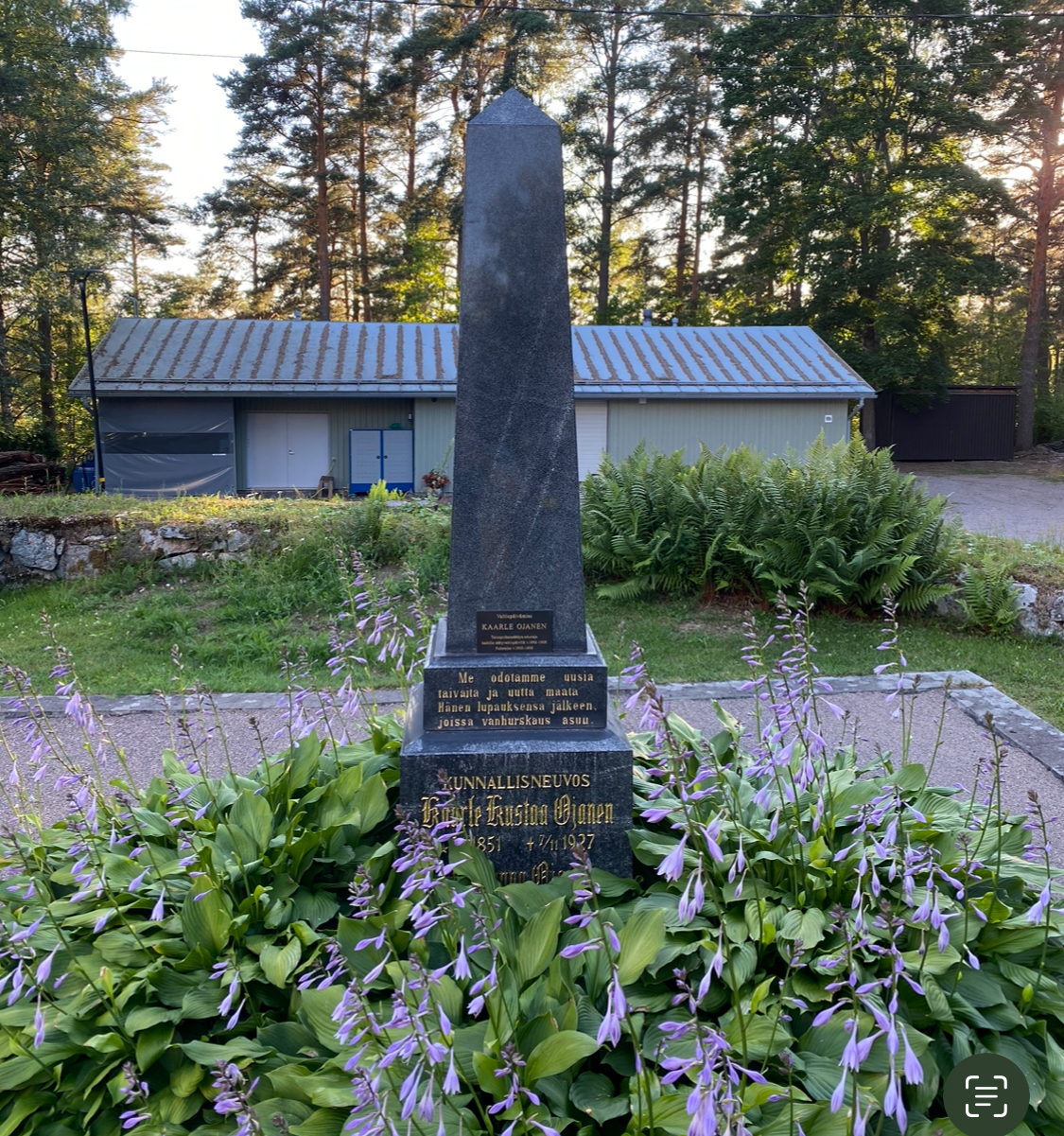
Ojanen's grave at Nummi cemetery.

Karl Gustaf (Kaarle Kustaa) Ojanen (3 January 1851 – 7 November 1927; original name Carl Gustav Tuorre) was a Finnish farmer and politician, born in Punkalaidun. He was a member of the Diet of Finland in 1882, 1885, 1888, 1891, 1894, 1897, 1899, 1900, from 1904 to 1905 and from 1905 to 1906 and of the Parliament of Finland from 1910 to 1911, representing the Finnish Party. Ojanen is buried in Nummi.
