= Jakob Tengström =

Finnish archbishop (1755–1832)

The Most Reverend Jakob Tengström
- Archbishop of Turku and Finland
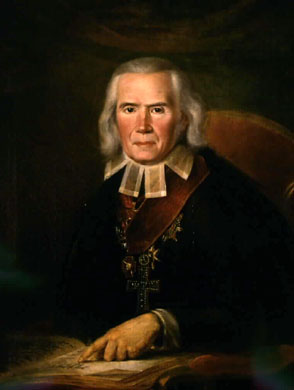
- Tengström by Gustaf Wilhelm Finnberg, 1826
- Church: Evangelical Lutheran Church of Finland
- Archdiocese: Turku
- Appointed: 5 February 1803
- In office: 1803–1832
- Predecessor: Jakob Gadolin
- Successor: Erik Gabriel Melartin

Orders
- Ordination: 1784
- Consecration: 1803 by Uno von Troil

Personal details
- Born: 4 December 1755 Kokkola, Kingdom of Sweden Present-day Finland
- Died: 26 December 1832 (aged 77) Turku, Grand Duchy of Finland, Russian Empire Present-day Finland
- Buried: Pargas
- Denomination: Lutheran
- Parents: Johan Georgsson Tengström & Maria Jakobsdotter Tengström
- Spouse: Anna Kristina Caloander
- Children: 6

Jacob Tengström (4 December 1755 - 26 December 1832) was a Finnish prelate who became the first Archbishop of Turku and Finland.

== Biography ==
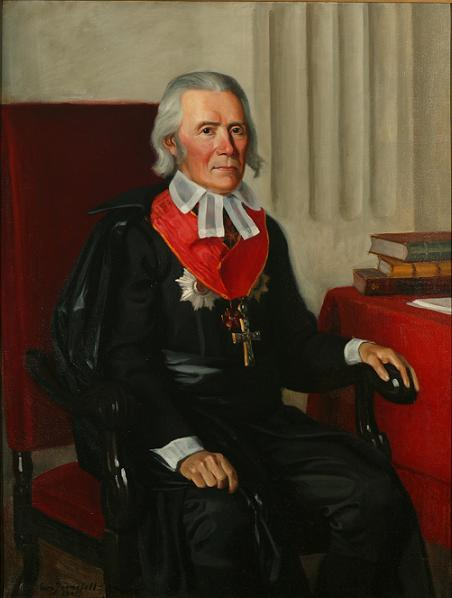
painted by Eero Järnefelt portrait of Tengström from 1901

Tengström was born on 4 December 1755 in Kokkola, Finland. He was the nephew of Anders Chydenius and the father of Johan Magnus af Tengström, a zoologist, and uncle of Johan Jakob Tengström, a historian and Fredrika Runeberg, a novelist.

Tengström published the Finnish-Swedish children's books Läse-öfning för mina barn and Tidsfördrif för mina barn in 1795 and 1796, latter of which was translated into Finnish in 1836. He was editor of the Tidningar Utgifne Af et Sällskap i Åbo from 1791 to 1793 and was involved in the founding of the Finnish Bible Society and the Musical Society in Turku. In 1796, he became a member of the society Pro Fide et Christianismo, founded to promote Christian education.

During the Finnish war, when it became apparent that Sweden would not be able to defend Finland against the Russian Empire, he worked actively to make Finland adapt to the new situation and to promote Finland's interests in Russia. He opposed resistance. He participated actively in the preparations for the Diet of Porvoo which saw the establishment of the Evangelical Lutheran Church of Finland as a separate and independent church from the Church of Sweden. He also became chairman of a committee that drafted proposals for supreme governance for the Grand Duchy of Finland. Tengström's good relationship with Emperor Alexander I influenced the development of the Grand Duchy of Finland.

As a bishop and archbishop, Tengström also worked with extensive reforms of the service life. The ecclesiastical books were under revision in Sweden when the war broke out and the reforms in Finland were led by Tengström. Also a new church law was founded, where the church got a freer position.

He succeeded Jakob Gadolin upon his death in 1802 where he became bishop of Turku until 1817 when the title of "Bishop of Turku" ceased to exist and was elevated to archiepiscopal rank in 1817. The title of the see was changed to Archbishop of Turku and Finland, and Tengström became the first archbishop until his death in 1832.

== See also ==
- List of Bishops of Turku

Religious titles
Preceded by Jakob Gadolin	Bishop of Turku; 1803 – 1817	Succeeded by No successor
Preceded by New office	Archbishop of Turku and Finland; 1817 – 1832	Succeeded by Erik Gabriel Melartin
