= Suhonen =

Suhonen is a Finnish surname. Notable people with the surname include:

- Alpo Suhonen (born 1948), Finnish ice hockey coach
- Anssi Suhonen (born 2001), Finnish footballer
- Ari Suhonen (born 1965)
- Heikki Suhonen (born 1951), Finnish footballer
- Mira Suhonen (born 1985), Finnish sport shooter
- Samuli Suhonen (born 1980), Finnish ice hockey player
