= Niirala =

City district in Kuopio, Finland

Coordinates: 62°53′20″N 27°39′05″E

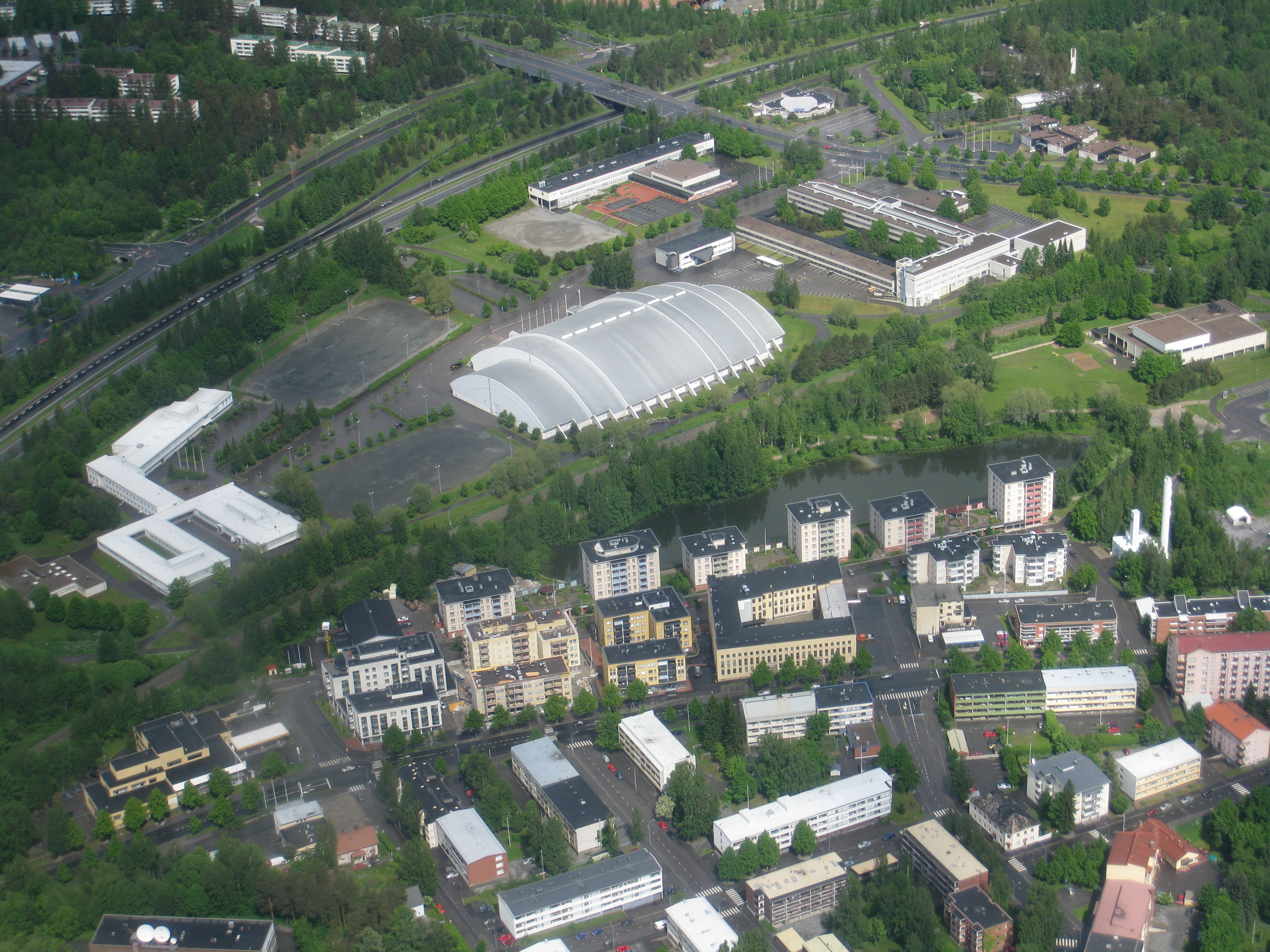
An aerial view of Niirala

Niirala is a district in the city of Kuopio, Finland, and it has a population of about 3,500. Niirala is now a popular residential area due to its good location between the Kuopio University and the city center. Niirala's main street is Niiralankatu. The neighboring parts of Niirala are Hatsala in the northeast, Haapaniemi in the southeast, and Savilahti in the west.

The area includes the Kuopio City Theatre, Alava Church, Minna Canth School and the popular oasis of the Valkeisenlampi Park. Niirala will have a total of about 1,300 jobs (January 1, 2008).
