= Julkula =

City district in Kuopio, Finland

Coordinates: 62°55′54″N 27°37′53″E

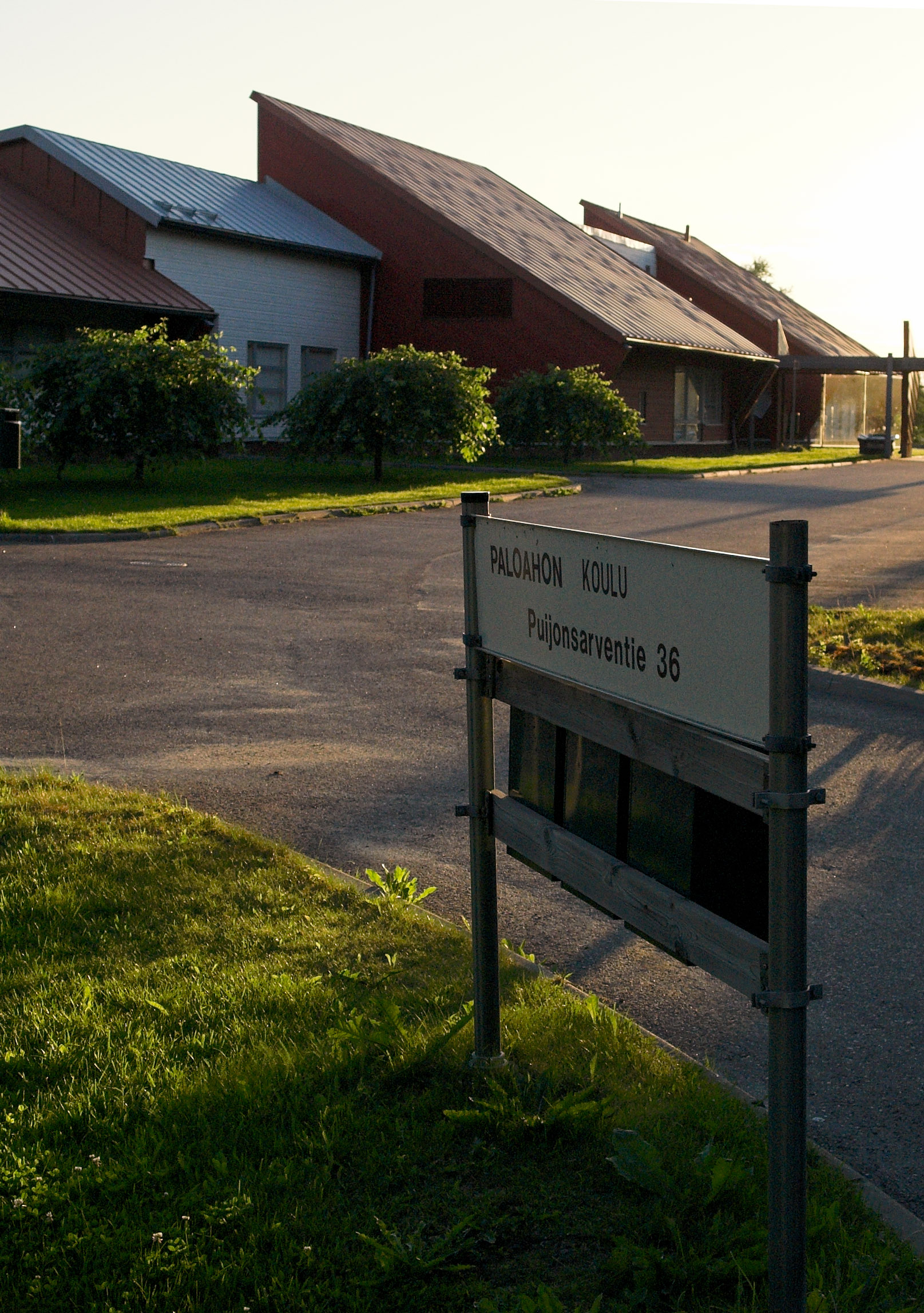
Paloaho School in Julkula

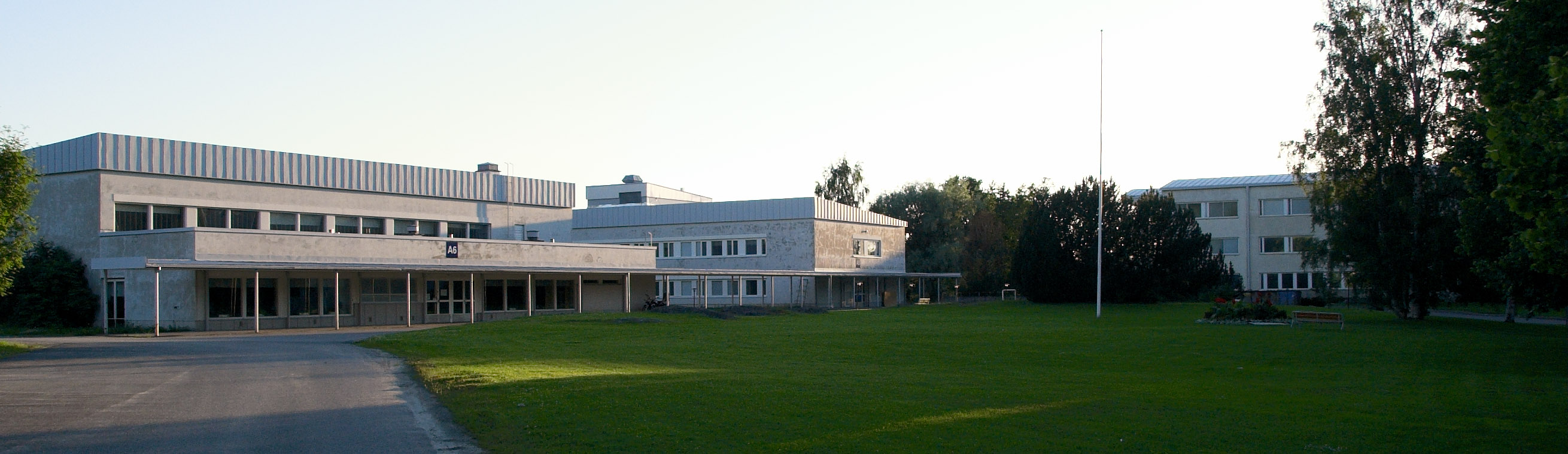
Julkula psychiatric hospital

Julkula is a district in the northwest part of the city of Kuopio, Finland. It is located 4-6 km from the city center on the western slope of Puijo. The area has a population of about 2,700 and its residential buildings are mainly small and terraced houses.

Services in the Julkula area include a kindergarten, preschool, youth center, K-market grocery store, marina, pub restaurant, bakery, hairdresser and a psychiatric hospital called Julkula Hospital. Julkula is located on the shores of Lake Kallavesi and has excellent outdoor sports opportunities typical of the Puijo area.

== Sources ==
- Arponen, Antti O.: Julkulan kaupunginosan vaiheita. Kuopio 1982.
