= Kuopio =

- City
- Kuopion kaupunki Kuopio stad City of Kuopio
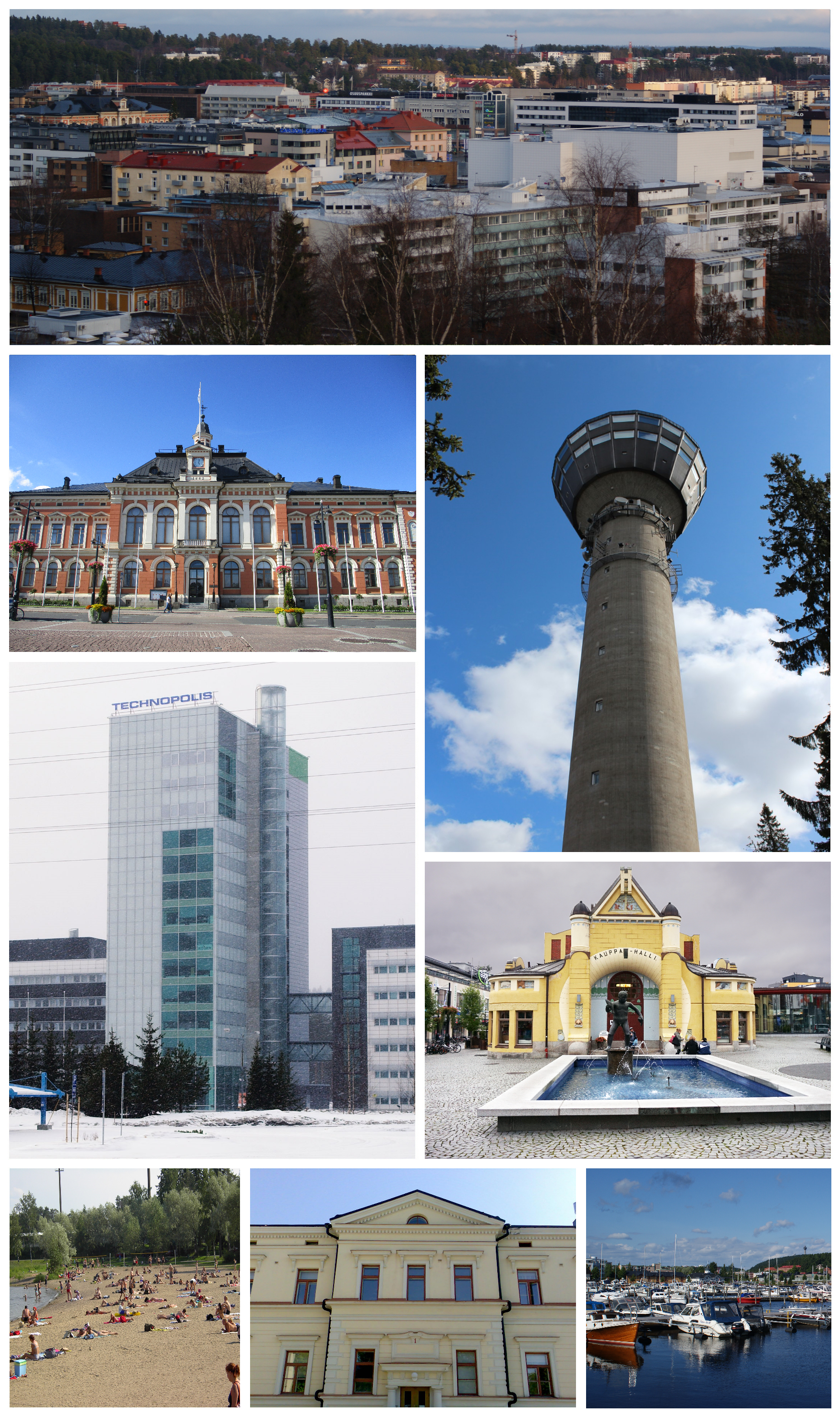
- Clockwise from top-left: the cityscape of the center, the Puijo tower, the Kuopio Market Hall, the Kuopio Marina, the Governor Palace, the Väinölänniemi Beach, the Technopolis MicroTower, and the Kuopio City Hall.

- Coat of arms
- Nickname: Promised Land of Kalakukko
- Interactive map of Kuopio
- Coordinates: 62°53′33″N 27°40′42″E
- Country: Finland
- Region: North Savo
- Sub-region: Kuopio
- Settled: 1653
- Charter: 17 November 1775

Government
  - City manager: Soile Lahti

Area (2018-01-01)
  - Total: 4,326.35 km^{2} (1,670.41 sq mi)
  - Land: 3,241.74 km^{2} (1,251.64 sq mi)
  - Water: 719.85 km^{2} (277.94 sq mi)
  - Rank: 18th largest in Finland

Population (2025-12-31)
  - Total: 126,572
  - Rank: 8th largest in Finland
  - Density: 39.04/km^{2} (101.1/sq mi)
- Demonym: kuopiolainen (Finnish)

Population by native language
  - Finnish: 92.6% (official)
  - Swedish: 0.1%
  - Others: 7.3%

Population by age
  - 0 to 14: 14.5%
  - 15 to 64: 63.8%
  - 65 or older: 21.7%
- Time zone: UTC+02:00 (EET)
  - Summer (DST): UTC+03:00 (EEST)
- Postal code: FI-70101
- Website: www.kuopio.fi/en/

Kuopio (/kuˈoʊpioʊ/ koo-OH-pee-oh, Finnish: [ˈkuo̯pio]) is a city in Finland and the regional capital of North Savo. It is located in the Finnish Lakeland. The population of Kuopio is approximately 127,000, while the sub-region has a population of approximately 148,000. It is the 8th most populous municipality in Finland, and the seventh most populous urban area in the country.

Kuopio has a total area of 4,326.35 square kilometres (1,670.41 sq mi), of which 719.85 km^{2} (277.94 sq mi) is water and half is forest. Although the city's population is spread over 39/km^{2} (100/sq mi), the city's urban areas are comparatively densely populated (urban area: 1,618 /km²), making Kuopio the second most densely populated city in Finland. At the end of 2018, its urban area had a population of approximately 90,000. Together with Joensuu, Kuopio is one of the major urban, economic and cultural centres of Eastern Finland.

Kuopio is nationally known as one of the most important study cities and centres of attraction and growth. The city's history has been marked by several municipality mergers since 1969, as a result of which Kuopio now encompasses much of the countryside; Kuopio's population surpassed 100,000 when the town of Nilsiä joined the city in early 2013. When Maaninka joined Kuopio at the beginning of 2015, Kuopio became the largest milk-producing municipality in Finland and the second largest beef-producing municipality in Finland. In addition, at the end of the 2010s, Kuopio was characterised by numerous large projects, the largest in the country after the Helsinki metropolitan area. Kuopio has also become a major tourist city with the large tourist centre in Tahkovuori. Kuopio Airport, located in the municipality of Siilinjärvi, is Finland's fifth busiest airport with over 235,000 passengers in 2017.

According to the Kuntarating 2017 survey, Kuopio has the most satisfied residents among the 20 largest cities, and according to the 2018 survey, Kuopio is the best city for property investors. In the Kuntien imago 2018 survey, Kuopio ranks second among Finland's large cities after Seinäjoki in South Ostrobothnia. In T-media's study on the attractiveness and influence of the ten largest cities in 2021, 2022 and 2023, Kuopio is the second most attractive city in Finland, with Tampere in first place.

Kuopio was the European Region of Gastronomy in 2020. It is also known as the home of Kalakukko, a traditional Savonian food, which is why Kuopio is also known as the "Promised Land of Kalakukko".

== Etymology ==
There are several theories regarding the origins of the name "Kuopio". One theory proposes that in the 16th century, a local notable named Kauhanen in Tavinsalmi, a village approximately 32 km to the northwest of the city, changed his name to Skopa. It is possible that this was derived from the Swedish word "Skopa", as Finland was under Swedish rule at the time and many members of the local Finnish nobility would adopt Swedish or Swedish-sounding names. This may explain why the word was pronounced differently when rendered in colloquial Finnish: first as "Coopia" and later "Cuopio". Another explanation is that Kuopio comes from the Finnish verb "kuopia", meaning "to paw (at)" or "to dig", as when a horse paws the ground with its hoof. The final theory, endorsed by the Research Institute for the Languages of Finland, is that the name "Kuopio" originates from Prokopij, the name of a Karelian man who lived in the Middle Ages and was said to have migrated from the village of Ruokolahti in Southern Karelia to the shores of Lake Kallavesi near present-day Kuopio, possibly to establish a trading post.

== Heraldry ==
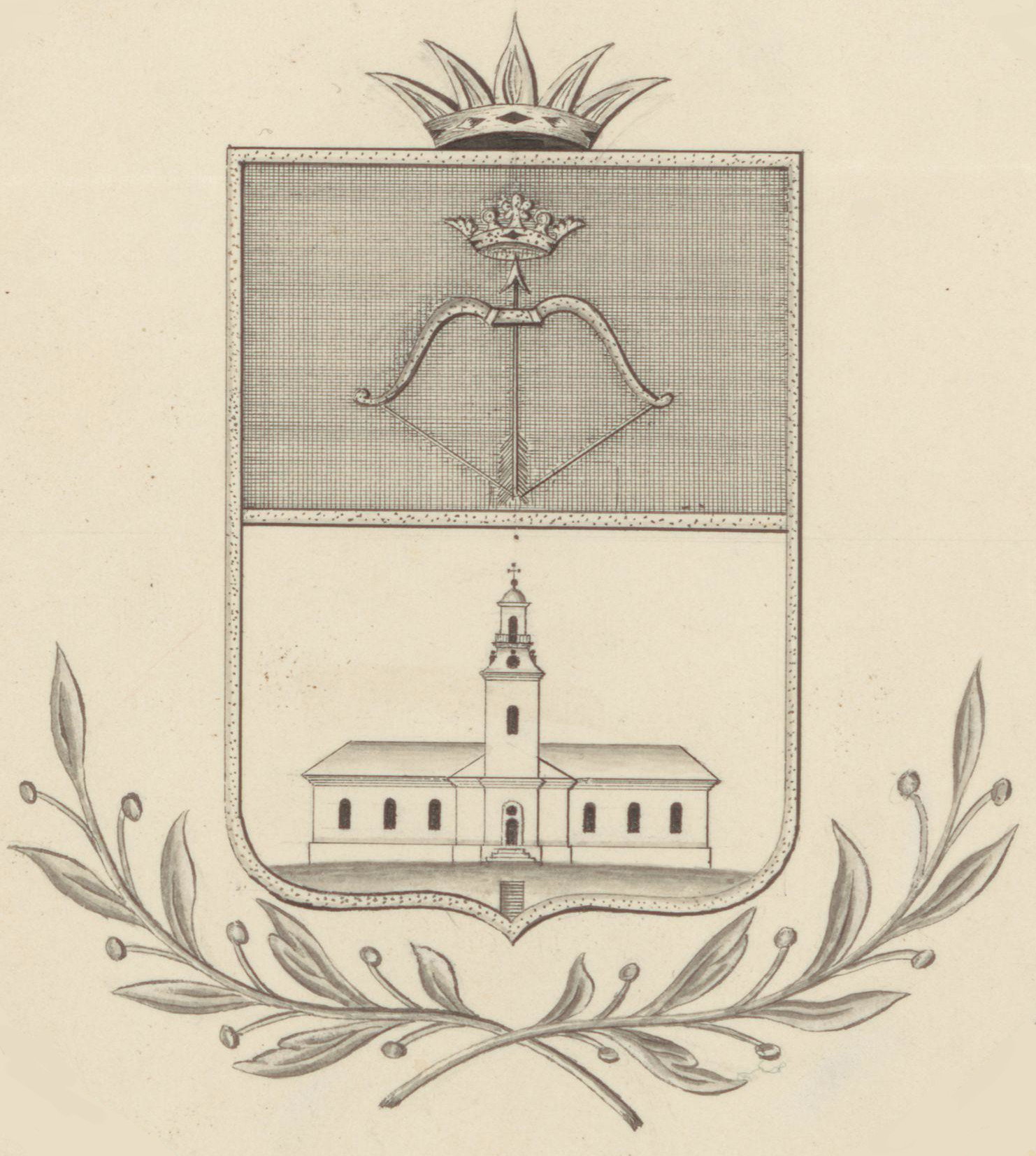
Original 1823 drawing of the coat of arms

The coat of arms of Kuopio was designed in 1823 based on a drawing by either the town councilor Karl Hårdh or his son, Adolf Hårdh, who was an artist. The coat of arms was approved for use in 1823 by the Kuopio Magistrate in accordance with a decree of Alexander I of Russia. The building depicted in the coat of arms is Kuopio Cathedral and is often mistaken for Kuopio City Hall, which was only built in 1886.

The current coat of arms was designed by architect Seppo Ruotsalainen and draws inspiration from the original. The current design was approved by the Kuopio City Council at a meeting on November 25, 1957 and was confirmed by the Ministry of the Interior on June 12, 1958.

== History ==
In the 1550s, the Finnish Church, under the influence of Protestant reformer Mikael Agricola, established parish church in Kuopionniemi. Governor Per Brahe the Younger founded the settlement of Kuopio in 1653. However, the official date of the city's founding is November 17, 1775, when King Gustav III of Sweden ordered the formal establishment of the city as the governmental seat of Savo-Karjala Province (Swedish: Savolax och Karelens län, Finnish: Savonlinnan ja Karjalan lääni).

Following the conclusion of the Finnish War in 1809, which occurred in the context of the broader Napoleonic Wars, Finland would be annexed by the Russian Empire as an autonomous Grand Duchy. In the 19th century, Eastern Finland would see considerable infrastructural investment and modernization, particularly in the realm of transportation. The development of infrastructure would lead to the further economic integration of previously isolated, inland areas, with economic and commercial hubs on the Baltic Coast. Major public works projects built during this time include the Saimaa Canal in 1856, which opened up a summer route between Lake Saimaa and the Baltic Sea, and the Savo railway in 1889, which passed through Kuopio en route to Mikkeli, Kouvola, Vyborg, and St. Petersburg. Kuopio's original train station was built the same year and would serve as the city's main rail terminus until 1934, when it was demolished replaced by the current Kuopio railway station.

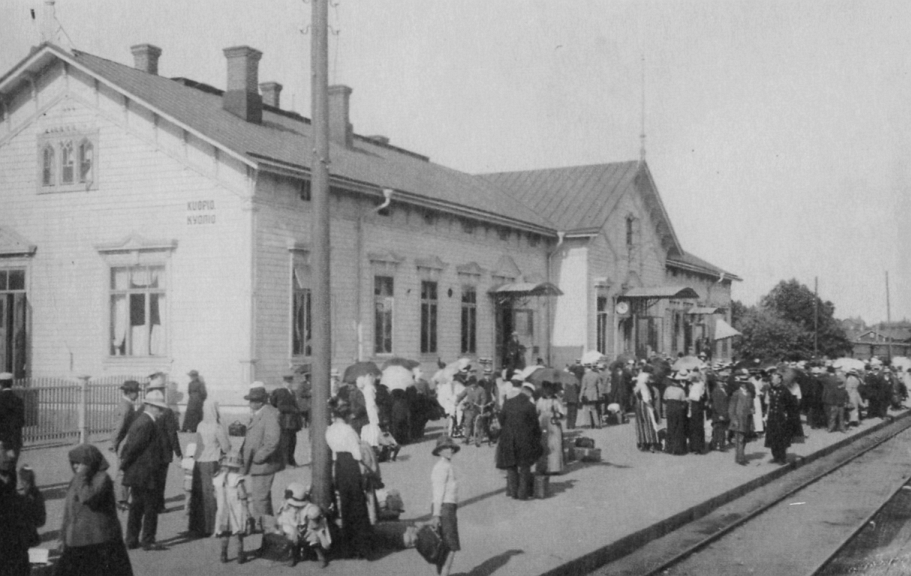
Kuopio's old railway station building and passengers in 1910.

Following World War II, Kuopio's population would grow significantly due in part to the settlement of Karelian evacuees and a high birth rate. Population growth necessitated the expansion of schools. At the end of the 1940s, support was also provided for school transports and the provision of free school meals, expanding a welfare program that had been active since 1902. In the 1960s, the construction of suburbs began with the development of Puijonlaakso. Since then, Kuopio has seen the further construction and growth of suburban areas. These include Tiihotar (as part of Saarijärvi) in the 1960s, Saarijärvi, Kelloniemi, and Levänen in the 1970s, and Jynkkä and Neulamäki in the 1980s.

The city of Kuopio has expanded to encompass several surrounding towns. The municipality of Maaninka joined the city of Kuopio in 2015, the town of Nilsiä in 2013, and Karttula in 2011, Vehmersalmi in 2005, Riistavesi in 1973, and Kuopion maalaiskunta in 1969.

== Geography ==
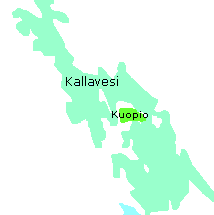
Kuopio is almost completely surrounded by lake Kallavesi.

The city is surrounded by Lake Kallavesi, and several parts of it are built on islands. With an area of 472.76 square kilometres (182.53 sq mi) Lake Kallavesi is the tenth largest lake in Finland. In the wake of the Yoldia Sea, which followed the Weichselian glaciation and preceded the Baltic Sea, there are ancient beaches up to 140 m above the current sea level, of which the current Lake Kallavesi is 82 m above sea level. Kuopio's ample waterfronts and islands are also used in the Saaristokaupunki (lit. Archipelago city) -project, the biggest residential area currently being built in Finland. Saaristokaupunki will accommodate a total of 14,000 inhabitants in 2015. All houses will be situated no more than 500 metres (1,600 ft) from the nearest lakeshore.

Kuopio Market Square is the undisputed center of the city and the city center follows a densely built grid pattern with several parks and narrow gutter streets. The environment of the city is quite distinctive; the surface shapes of the waterfront-lined center are so variable that a flat property is a desired rarity. The settlement has spread outside the center of Kuopio according to a dense and sparse finger model that is affordable for public transport, and the new districts have been built in a municipal drive at once; for example, the Saaristokaupunki was banned for building for the previous 25 years, and this Kuopio zoning tradition has a long history. Due to the above-mentioned factors, the population density of the Kuopio city center is the highest in Finland.

With the surrounding lakes, the shoreline in Kuopio is 4,760 kilometers. The terrain is also characterized by rich forests, and the clear center of the Kuopio's lund forest is mainly located in the area between Kuopio, Nilsiä and Siilinjärvi. Of the Finnish municipalities, Kuopio has the second largest number of summer cottages and holiday homes. In 2013, the number of summer cottages was 8,684. The number of summer homes in Kuopio has increased in recent years due to municipal associations. Due to the abundance of water bodies, Kuopio also has a remarkably favorable climate compared to the latitude. The annual sum of the effective temperature is about as high in Kuopio as in places further south than it, for example, Tampere and Lahti.

=== Subdivisions ===
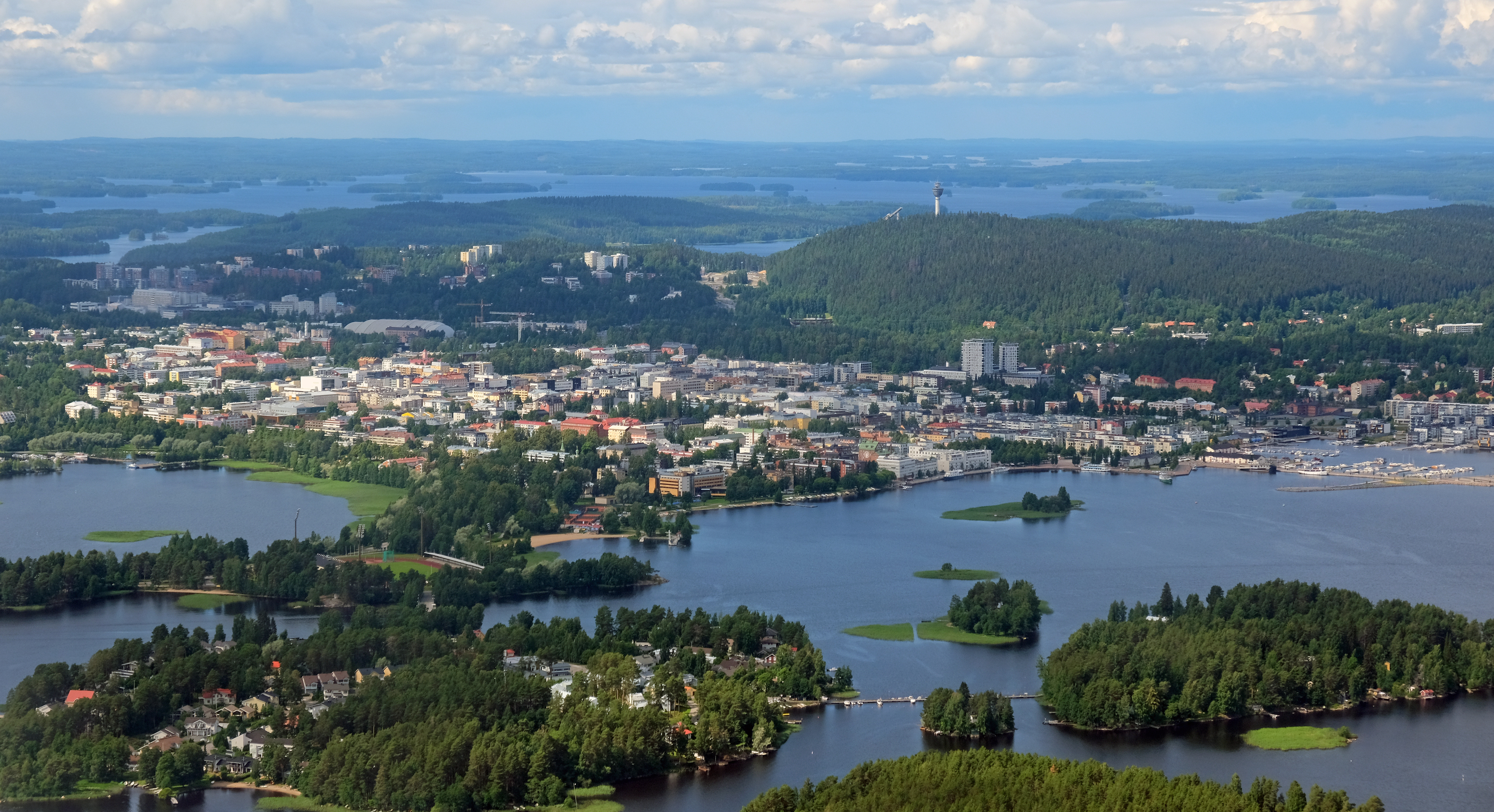
An aerial view of Kuopio.

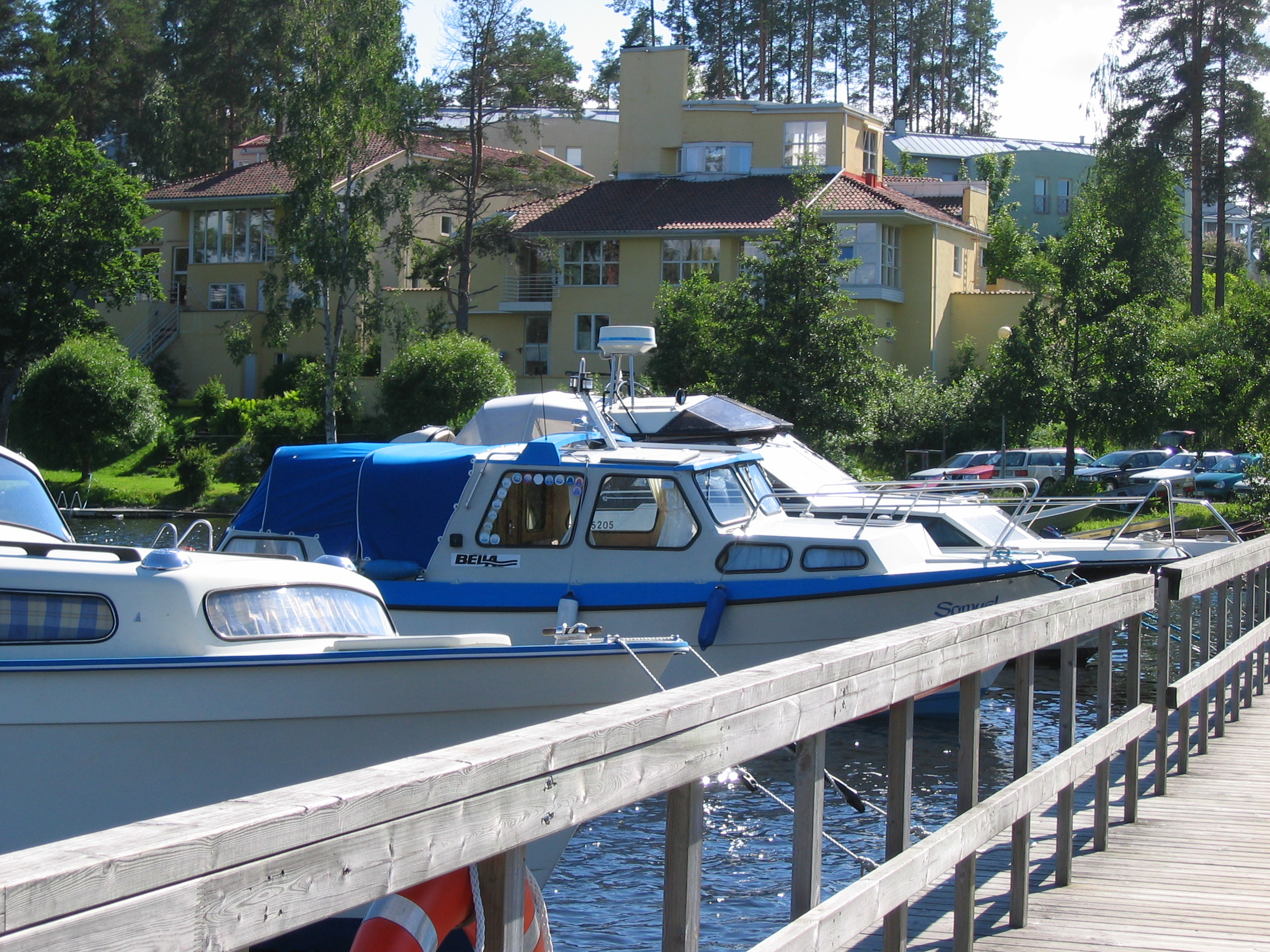
Boats in the Rönö district.

There are more than 50 districts and villages in Kuopio.

1. Väinölänniemi
2. Vahtivuori
3. Maljalahti
4. Multimäki
5. Kuopionlahti
6. Hatsala
7. Niirala
8. Haapaniemi
9. Itkonniemi
10. Männistö
11. Linnanpelto
12. Saarijärvi
13. Puijonlaakso
14. Savilahti
15. Peipposenrinne
16. Inkilänmäki
17. Särkiniemi
18. Kettulanlahti
19. Rahusenkangas
20. Rönö
21. Rypysuo
22. Päiväranta
23. Julkula
24. Sorsasalo
25. Kelloniemi
26. Levänen
27. Jynkkä
28. Neulamäki
29. Puijo
30. Niuva
31. Neulaniemi
32. Kolmisoppi
33. Neulalampi
34. Petonen
35. Litmanen
36. Pirtti
37. Pitkälahti
38. Saaristokaupunki
39. Lehtoniemi
40. Rautaniemi
41. Hiltulanlahti
42. Kiviharju
43. Vanuvuori
44. Melalahti
45. Kurkimäki
46. Vehmersalmi
47. Karttula
48. Nilsiä
49. Tahko
50. Maaninka
51. Keskisaari
52. Juankoski
53. Säyneinen
54. Puutossalmi
55. Pellesmäki

=== Climate ===
Kuopio

Climate chart (precipitation, max. and min. temperature)
| J | F | M | A | M | J | J | A | S | O | N | D |
| 41 −5 −11 | 35 −5 −12 | 31 0 −8 | 29 7 −2 | 49 14 5 | 71 19 11 | 85 22 14 | 66 20 12 | 55 14 8 | 55 6 2 | 51 1 −3 | 51 −3 −8 |
- █ Average max. and min. temperatures in °C
- █ Precipitation totals in mm
Imperial conversion
| J | F | M | A | M | J | J | A | S | O | N | D |
| 1.6 23 12 | 1.4 23 11 | 1.2 32 18 | 1.1 44 29 | 1.9 58 40 | 2.8 66 51 | 3.3 71 57 | 2.6 67 54 | 2.2 56 46 | 2.2 43 36 | 2 33 27 | 2 27 18 |
- █ Average max. and min. temperatures in °F
- █ Precipitation totals in inches

Kuopio falls in the continental climate zone (Köppen climate classification Dfb), bordering on subarctic climate zone (Köppen "Dfc"). Winters are long and cold, with average highs staying below freezing from November until March, and summers are short and relatively mild. Most precipitation occurs in the late summer and early fall. The summers are relatively warm for its latitude, especially the lows. This is due to influence from the lake, making it much warmer on summer nights than in areas away from water. In winter, maritime moderation is eliminated as the lake freezes over. Average temperatures for all seasons have warmed in recent decades.

Climate data for Kuopio Airport, Siilinjärvi (1991–2020 normals, extremes 1940–present, sunshine 1981–2010)
| Month | Jan | Feb | Mar | Apr | May | Jun | Jul | Aug | Sep | Oct | Nov | Dec | Year |
|---|---|---|---|---|---|---|---|---|---|---|---|---|---|
| Record high °C (°F) | 7.9 (46.2) | 9.7 (49.5) | 13.3 (55.9) | 21.9 (71.4) | 28.6 (83.5) | 31.9 (89.4) | 33.8 (92.8) | 33.2 (91.8) | 25.9 (78.6) | 19.1 (66.4) | 11.7 (53.1) | 8.6 (47.5) | 33.8 (92.8) |
| Mean daily maximum °C (°F) | −5.2 (22.6) | −4.9 (23.2) | −0.2 (31.6) | 6.7 (44.1) | 14.2 (57.6) | 19.1 (66.4) | 21.8 (71.2) | 19.5 (67.1) | 13.5 (56.3) | 6.3 (43.3) | 0.8 (33.4) | −2.6 (27.3) | 7.4 (45.3) |
| Daily mean °C (°F) | −8.1 (17.4) | −8.3 (17.1) | −3.7 (25.3) | 2.4 (36.3) | 9.3 (48.7) | 14.7 (58.5) | 17.6 (63.7) | 15.6 (60.1) | 10.3 (50.5) | 4.1 (39.4) | −1.0 (30.2) | −5 (23) | 4.0 (39.2) |
| Mean daily minimum °C (°F) | −11.2 (11.8) | −11.8 (10.8) | −7.6 (18.3) | −1.7 (28.9) | 4.6 (40.3) | 10.6 (51.1) | 13.7 (56.7) | 12.2 (54.0) | 7.6 (45.7) | 2.1 (35.8) | −3.0 (26.6) | −7.6 (18.3) | 0.7 (33.2) |
| Record low °C (°F) | −39.3 (−38.7) | −37.0 (−34.6) | −33.0 (−27.4) | −20.9 (−5.6) | −8.2 (17.2) | 0.1 (32.2) | 4.7 (40.5) | 2.7 (36.9) | −4.9 (23.2) | −15.0 (5.0) | −27.6 (−17.7) | −41.1 (−42.0) | −41.1 (−42.0) |
| Average precipitation mm (inches) | 41 (1.6) | 35 (1.4) | 31 (1.2) | 29 (1.1) | 49 (1.9) | 71 (2.8) | 85 (3.3) | 66 (2.6) | 55 (2.2) | 55 (2.2) | 51 (2.0) | 51 (2.0) | 619 (24.3) |
| Average precipitation days | 11 | 9 | 9 | 7 | 9 | 10 | 11 | 11 | 10 | 11 | 11 | 11 | 120 |
| Mean monthly sunshine hours | 28 | 65 | 121 | 194 | 254 | 258 | 271 | 203 | 116 | 57 | 22 | 12 | 1,601 |
Source: Finnish Meteorological Institute FMI(record highs and lows 1940–1961)

Climate data for Kuopio Maaninka (normals 1991–2020, extremes 1959–present)
| Month | Jan | Feb | Mar | Apr | May | Jun | Jul | Aug | Sep | Oct | Nov | Dec | Year |
|---|---|---|---|---|---|---|---|---|---|---|---|---|---|
| Record high °C (°F) | 8.0 (46.4) | 9.2 (48.6) | 13.2 (55.8) | 21.2 (70.2) | 28.4 (83.1) | 32.6 (90.7) | 35.0 (95.0) | 32.9 (91.2) | 26.0 (78.8) | 18.4 (65.1) | 11.0 (51.8) | 8.5 (47.3) | 35.0 (95.0) |
| Mean maximum °C (°F) | 3.2 (37.8) | 3.2 (37.8) | 7.7 (45.9) | 15.4 (59.7) | 23.5 (74.3) | 26.5 (79.7) | 27.7 (81.9) | 25.7 (78.3) | 20.1 (68.2) | 12.7 (54.9) | 7.2 (45.0) | 3.7 (38.7) | 28.9 (84.0) |
| Mean daily maximum °C (°F) | −5.1 (22.8) | −4.8 (23.4) | 0.4 (32.7) | 6.7 (44.1) | 14.1 (57.4) | 19.1 (66.4) | 21.8 (71.2) | 19.5 (67.1) | 13.7 (56.7) | 6.2 (43.2) | 0.8 (33.4) | −2.6 (27.3) | 7.5 (45.5) |
| Daily mean °C (°F) | −8.2 (17.2) | −8.4 (16.9) | −3.8 (25.2) | 2.2 (36.0) | 9.1 (48.4) | 14.4 (57.9) | 17.1 (62.8) | 15.1 (59.2) | 10.0 (50.0) | 3.9 (39.0) | −1.1 (30.0) | −5.1 (22.8) | 3.8 (38.8) |
| Mean daily minimum °C (°F) | −11.6 (11.1) | −12.2 (10.0) | −8.1 (17.4) | −2.1 (28.2) | 3.8 (38.8) | 9.5 (49.1) | 12.4 (54.3) | 10.7 (51.3) | 6.5 (43.7) | 1.6 (34.9) | −3.1 (26.4) | −7.9 (17.8) | 0.0 (31.9) |
| Mean minimum °C (°F) | −27.5 (−17.5) | −27.3 (−17.1) | −20.9 (−5.6) | −11.0 (12.2) | −3.0 (26.6) | 2.5 (36.5) | 6.0 (42.8) | 4.1 (39.4) | −0.8 (30.6) | −6.8 (19.8) | −13.6 (7.5) | −21.9 (−7.4) | −30.7 (−23.3) |
| Record low °C (°F) | −40.2 (−40.4) | −41.2 (−42.2) | −35.4 (−31.7) | −21.8 (−7.2) | −8.4 (16.9) | −2.7 (27.1) | 1.6 (34.9) | −2.2 (28.0) | −6.1 (21.0) | −21.0 (−5.8) | −32.3 (−26.1) | −35.0 (−31.0) | −41.2 (−42.2) |
| Average precipitation mm (inches) | 41 (1.6) | 35 (1.4) | 31 (1.2) | 29 (1.1) | 49 (1.9) | 71 (2.8) | 85 (3.3) | 66 (2.6) | 55 (2.2) | 55 (2.2) | 51 (2.0) | 51 (2.0) | 619 (24.3) |
| Average precipitation days (≥ 0.1 mm) | 21 | 17 | 15 | 12 | 14 | 15 | 15 | 16 | 17 | 19 | 21 | 21 | 203 |
Source 1: FMI normals 1991–2020
Source 2: Record highs and lows

== Demographics ==
=== Population ===
Historical population
| Year | Pop. | ±% p.a. |
|---|---|---|
| 1815 | 1,087 | — |
| 1840 | 2,071 | +2.61% |
| 1850 | 2,849 | +3.24% |
| 1860 | 4,066 | +3.62% |
| 1870 | 5,639 | +3.32% |
| 1880 | 6,871 | +2.00% |
| 1890 | 8,882 | +2.60% |
| 1900 | 11,723 | +2.81% |
| 1910 | 15,845 | +3.06% |
| 1920 | 18,725 | +1.68% |
| 1930 | 24,082 | +2.55% |
| 1940 | 25,157 | +0.44% |
| 1950 | 33,353 | +2.86% |
| 1960 | 44,911 | +3.02% |
| 1970 | 63,766 | +3.57% |
| 1972 | 96,443 | +22.98% |
| 1980 | 99,687 | +0.41% |
| 1990 | 104,675 | +0.49% |
| 2000 | 108,890 | +0.40% |
| 2010 | 112,336 | +0.31% |
| 2020 | 120,210 | +0.68% |
Source: Tilastollinen päätoimisto, Statistics Finland (1972–2020)

The city of Kuopio has 126,572 inhabitants, making it the 8th most populous municipality in Finland. The region of Kuopio is the 7th largest in Finland, after the regions of Helsinki, Tampere, Turku, Oulu, Jyväskylä and Lahti. Kuopio is home to 2% of Finland's population. 7% of the population has a foreign background, which is below the national average.

Population size 1980–2025
| Year | Population |
|---|---|
| 1980 | 99,687 |
| 1985 | 102,686 |
| 1990 | 104,675 |
| 1995 | 108,199 |
| 2000 | 108,890 |
| 2005 | 110,208 |
| 2010 | 112,336 |
| 2015 | 116,921 |
| 2020 | 120,210 |
| 2025 | 126,572 |

=== Languages ===
Population by
mother tongue (2025)
1. Finnish (92.6%)
2. Russian (1.40%)
3. Ukrainian (0.80%)
4. Arabic (0.70%)
5. English (0.50%)
6. Bengali (0.30%)
7. Persian (0.20%)
8. Other (3.50%)

Kuopio is a monolingual Finnish-speaking municipality. The majority of the population, 117,221 persons (92.6%), spoke Finnish as their first language. In addition, the number of Swedish speakers was 143 persons (0.1%) of the population. Foreign languages were spoken by 7.3% of the population. As English and Swedish are compulsory school subjects, functional bilingualism or trilingualism acquired through language studies is not uncommon.

At least 100 different languages are spoken in Kuopio. The most common foreign languages are Russian (1.4%), Ukrainian (0.8%), Arabic (0.7%), English (0.5%) and Bengali (0.3%).

=== Immigration ===
Population by country of birth (2025)
| Country of birth | Population | % |
| Finland | 117,537 | 92.9 |
| Soviet Union | 1,449 | 1.1 |
| Ukraine | 630 | 0.5 |
| Russia | 607 | 0.5 |
| Nigeria | 366 | 0.3 |
| Bangladesh | 352 | 0.3 |
| Sweden | 320 | 0.3 |
| Thailand | 276 | 0.2 |
| Syria | 262 | 0.2 |
| China | 254 | 0.2 |
| Other | 4,021 | 3.2 |

As of 2024, 8,517 people with a foreign background lived in Kuopio, representing 7% of the population. (Note: Statistics Finland classifies a person as having a "foreign background" if both parents or the only known parent were born abroad.) There are 8,269 residents who were born abroad, which makes up 7% of the population. The number of foreign citizens in Kuopio is 5,980. Most foreign-born citizens come from the former Soviet Union, Russia, Ukraine, Sweden, Niger and Syria.

The relative proportion of immigrants in Kuopio's population is below the national average. It is lower than in the major Finnish cities of Helsinki, Espoo, Tampere, Vantaa or Turku.

=== Religion ===
In 2023, the Evangelical Lutheran Church was the largest religious group with 65.6% of the population of Kuopio. Other religious groups accounted for 3.8% of the population. 30.6% of the population had no religious affiliation.

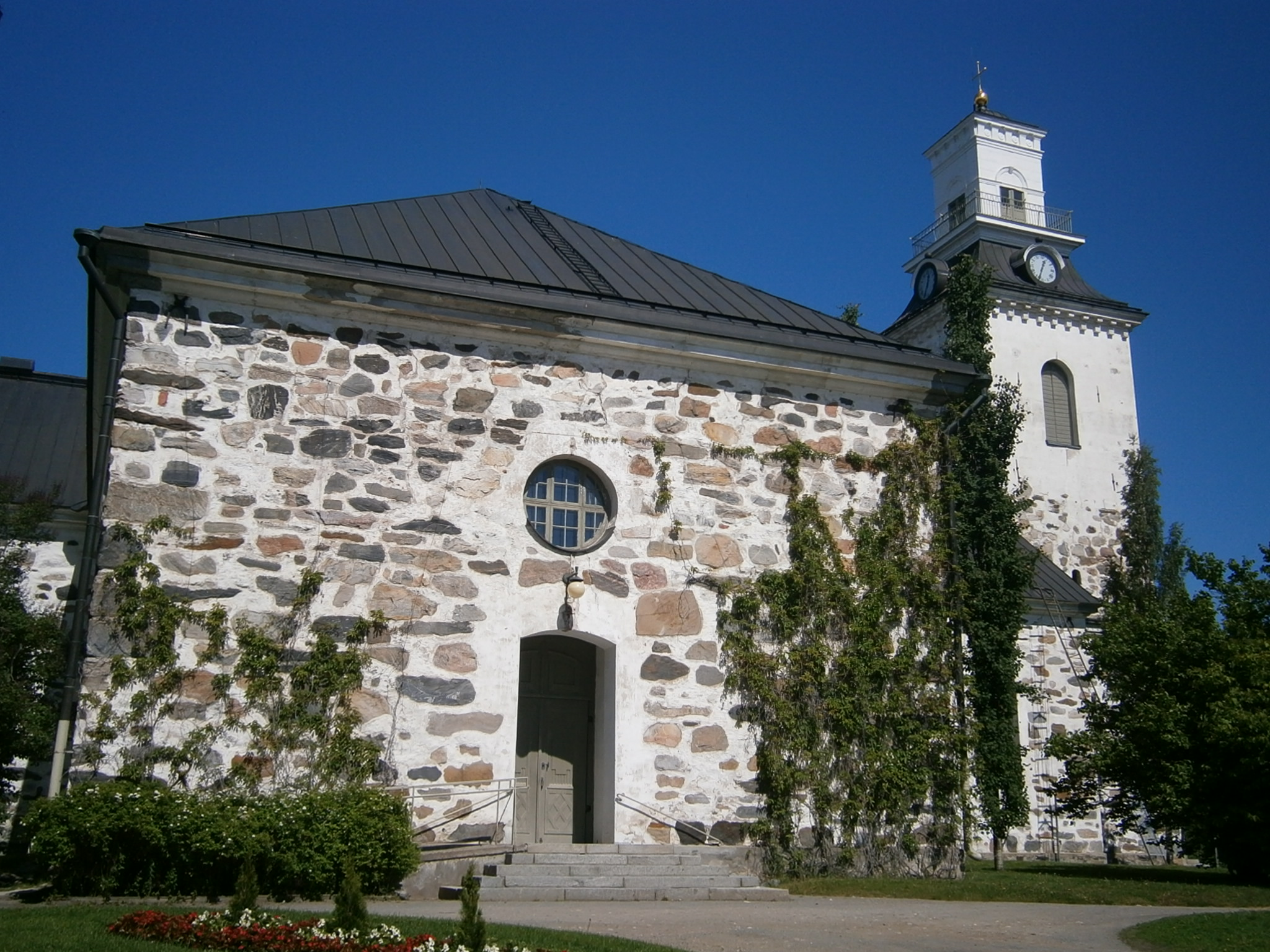
Kuopio Cathedral

The largest church denomination in Finland, Lutheran Church has a diocese in Kuopio, which is shepherded by bishop Jari Jolkkonen. One of the most significant Lutheran churches in the city is the Kuopio Cathedral, completed in 1816.

Until 2018, Kuopio was home to primate of the Finnish Orthodox Church, the called Archbishop of Karelia and all Finland. Since 2018, the primate is seated in Helsinki and Kuopio became the seat of the Diocese of Kuopio and Karelia. The late Archbishop Paul had been successful in producing literature of popular Orthodox theology. The city is also the location of RIISA- Orthodox Church Museum of Finland.

Kuopio also has an Islamic mosque. Muslims from various parts of the world and certain Finnish Muslims live in Kuopio.

The town is also home to the first Burmese Buddhist monastery in Finland, named the Buddha Dhamma Ramsi Monastery.

== Economy ==
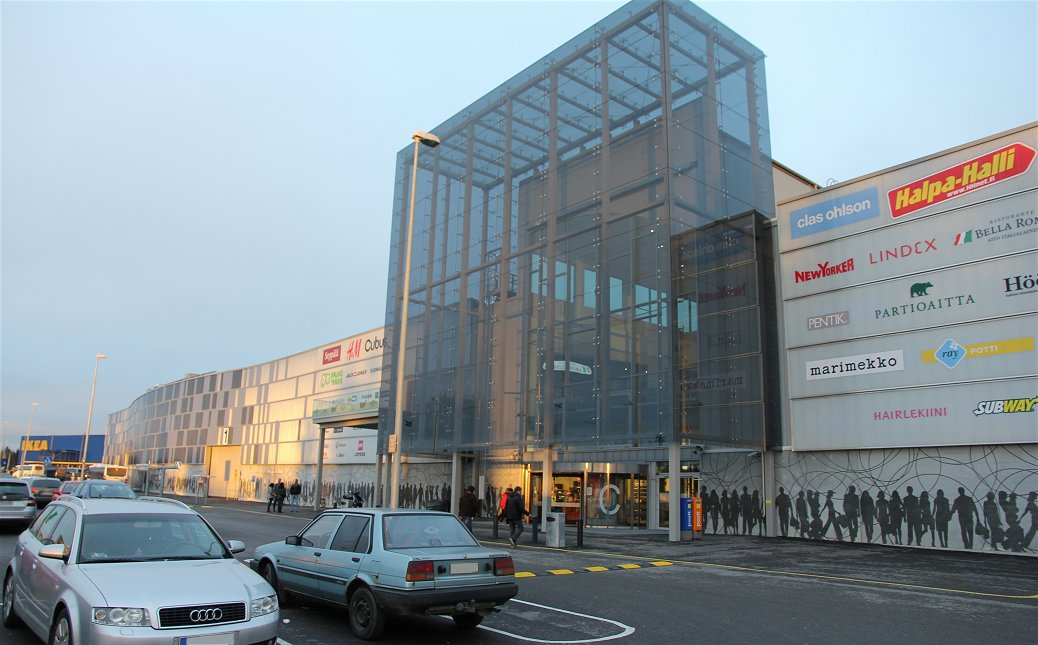
Matkus Shopping Centre in Hiltulanlahti, Kuopio

Kuopio's economic structure is very diverse. In 2008, there were about 4,200 enterprises in Kuopio, of which approximately 180 were export companies. These provided about 45,000 jobs. In 2016, this grew to a total of about 5,050 companies, of which more than 190 also trade abroad. There are a total of 50,877 jobs. The business service of the City of Kuopio plays a significant role in the development of Kuopio's business life. The business service promotes the development of companies operating in Kuopio and improves the operating environments of companies. The most important thing in developing operating environments is to improve the supply of estate and business premises. The Kuopio University Hospital (KUH) is Kuopio's second largest employer after the City of Kuopio; in 2011, KUH employed a total of 4,113 people.

Tourism is of great importance to Kuopio's business life; the Rauhalahti camping site is one indication of Kuopio's expertise, as it is the only five-star camping site in Finland. The city has also a comprehensive hotel offer for tourism, one of the most notable is Hotel Savonia, part of the Best Western hotel chain, in the Puijonlaakso district. Arranging accommodation and program services gives many jobs. Kuopio's Entrepreneurs (Kuopion Yrittäjät), the local association of Savo's Entrepreneurs (Savon Yrittäjät), operates in Kuopio.

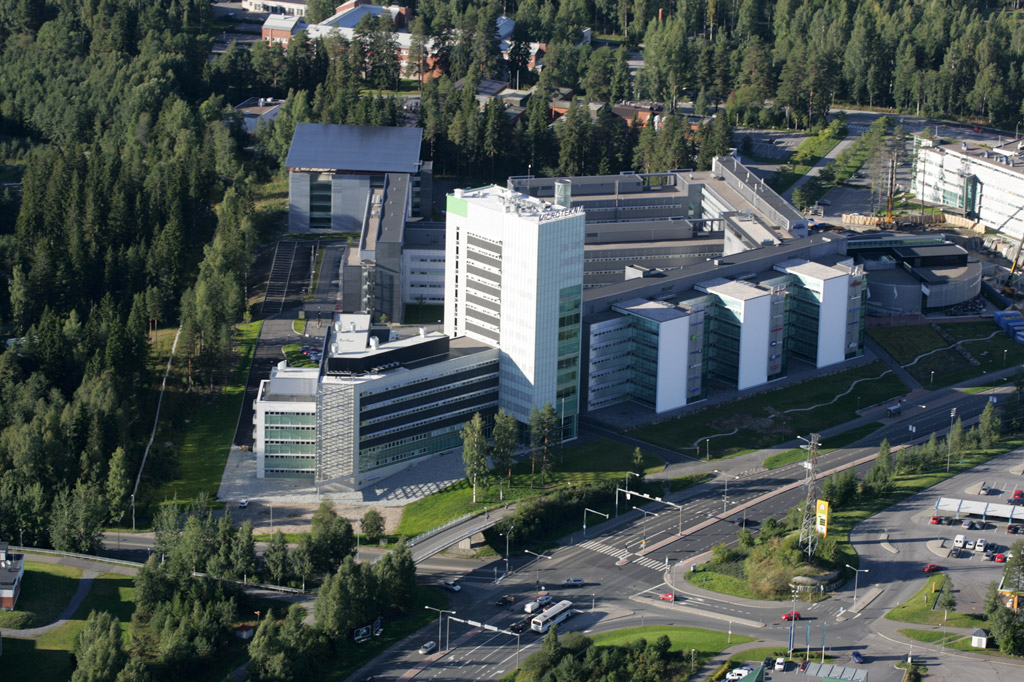
Technology centre Technopolis Kuopio is situated in Kuopio Science Park.

The most significant recent business projects are the centralization of Honeywell's Finnish operations in Kuopio, the completion of Ark Therapeutics' gene medicine plant, the marine industry concentration built by Bella Boats at the Marine Park in Haapaniemi's Siikaniemi and the construction of Junttan's EUR 15 million assembly plant at Kylmämäki at the end of 2008. The site of Junttan's current factory in Särkilahti will have space for a large shopping center. The 9.7-hectare plot purchased by Savocon and TKD Finland for EUR 11 million has a building right for 58,500 square meters. The two companies plan to invest a total of about 40 million euros in the project. A significant industrial player is also Savon Sello company in Sorsasalo, which is currently owned by Powerflute Oyj. One of the biggest projects and investments of recent years is the preparation of the construction of Finnpulp's largest and most modern softwood pulp mill in Kuopio. The most significant retail investments are the Prisma hypermarket completed in December 2007 and the Päiväranta's K-Citymarket completed in August 2008. A hardware store Kodin Terra was opened in Pitkälahti, as well as the Ikano Group's Matkus Shopping Center in the Hiltulanlahti area in November 2012 and an IKEA department store in May 2013.

== Culture ==
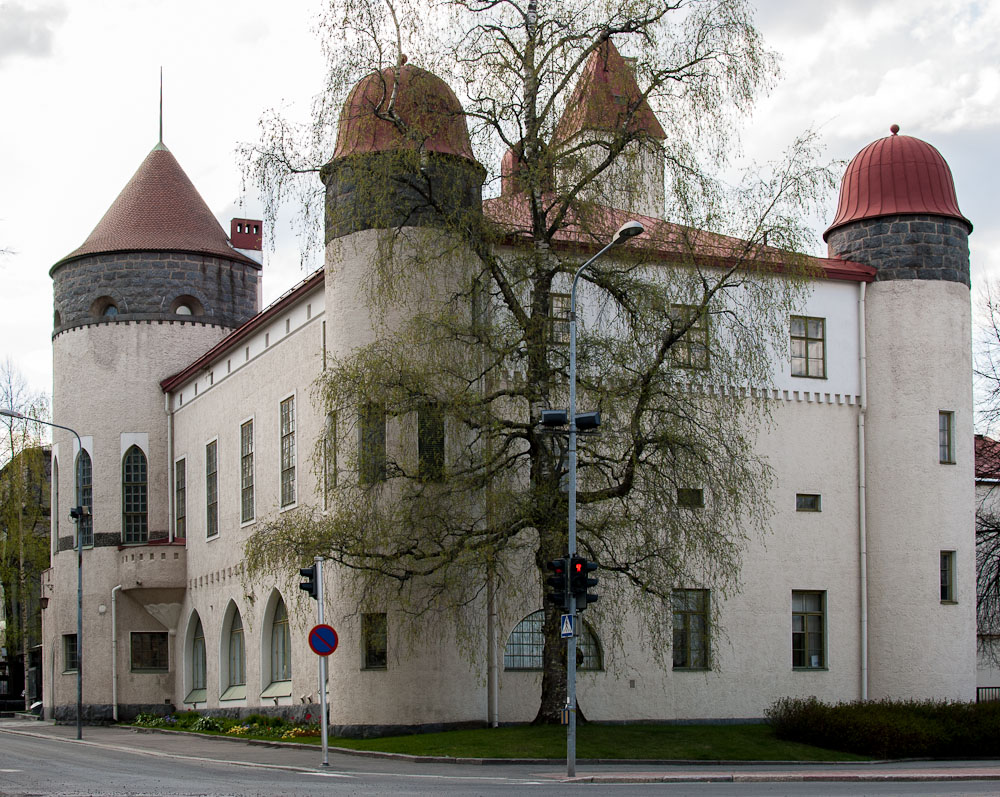
Kuopio Museum in a National Romantic style building

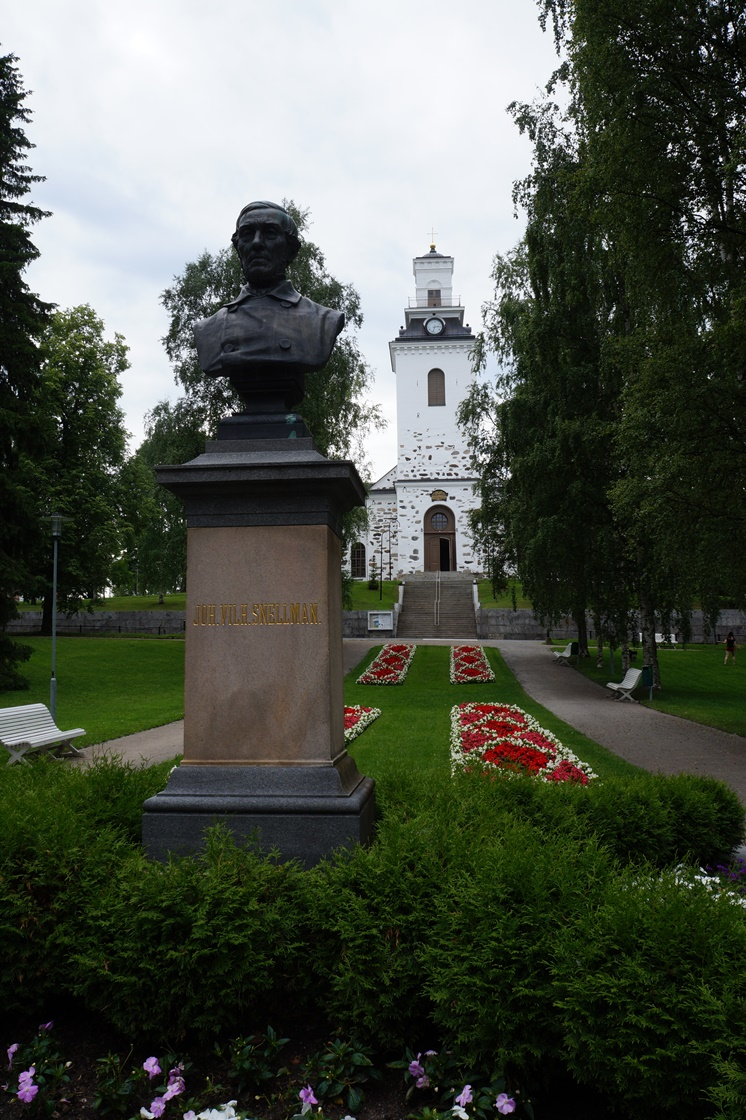
Bust of J. V. Snellman in Snellman Park (Snellmaninpuisto)

Kuopio is known as the cultural center of Eastern Finland. One of Kuopio's most important cultural venues are the Kuopio Museum, the Kuopio Art Museum and the Kuopio City Theatre in the city center. A wide range of musical (from kindergarten to doctorate-level studies) and dance education is available and the cultural life is active. Notable events include ANTI – Contemporary Art Festival, Kuopio Dance Festival, Kuopio Rockcock, Kuopio Wine Festival, Kuopio Marathon and Finland Ice Marathon in winter. A notable place, however, to enjoy the local flavor of Kuopio life and food is Sampo, a fish restaurant loved by locals and tourists as well.

Kuopio is known for its association with a national delicacy, Finnish fish pastry (Kalakukko), and the dialect of Savo, as well as the hill of Puijo and the Puijo tower. Besides being a very popular outdoor recreation area, Puijo serves also as a stage for a yearly World Cup ski jumping competition.

In inhabitants of Kuopio have a special reputation: they are known as jovial and verbally joking. Within the Savo culture, the onus is placed on the listener to interpret the story. People of the Kuopio region and Eastern Finland have always had many health problems and the mortality has been higher than on an average in Finland. Because of this, Eastern Finland has been a hotspot for Public Health studies. The North Karelia Project by the University of Kuopio in coordination with the National Public Health Institute and the World Health Organization, beginning in the 1970s was one of its first steps towards world class research. Niuvanniemi a historical psychiatric hospital is also located in the western part of the city in the Niuva district.

During the 2000s, Kuopio has placed very well in a number of image, popularity and city-attractiveness surveys. In 2007 it was placed third, behind Tampere and Oulu.

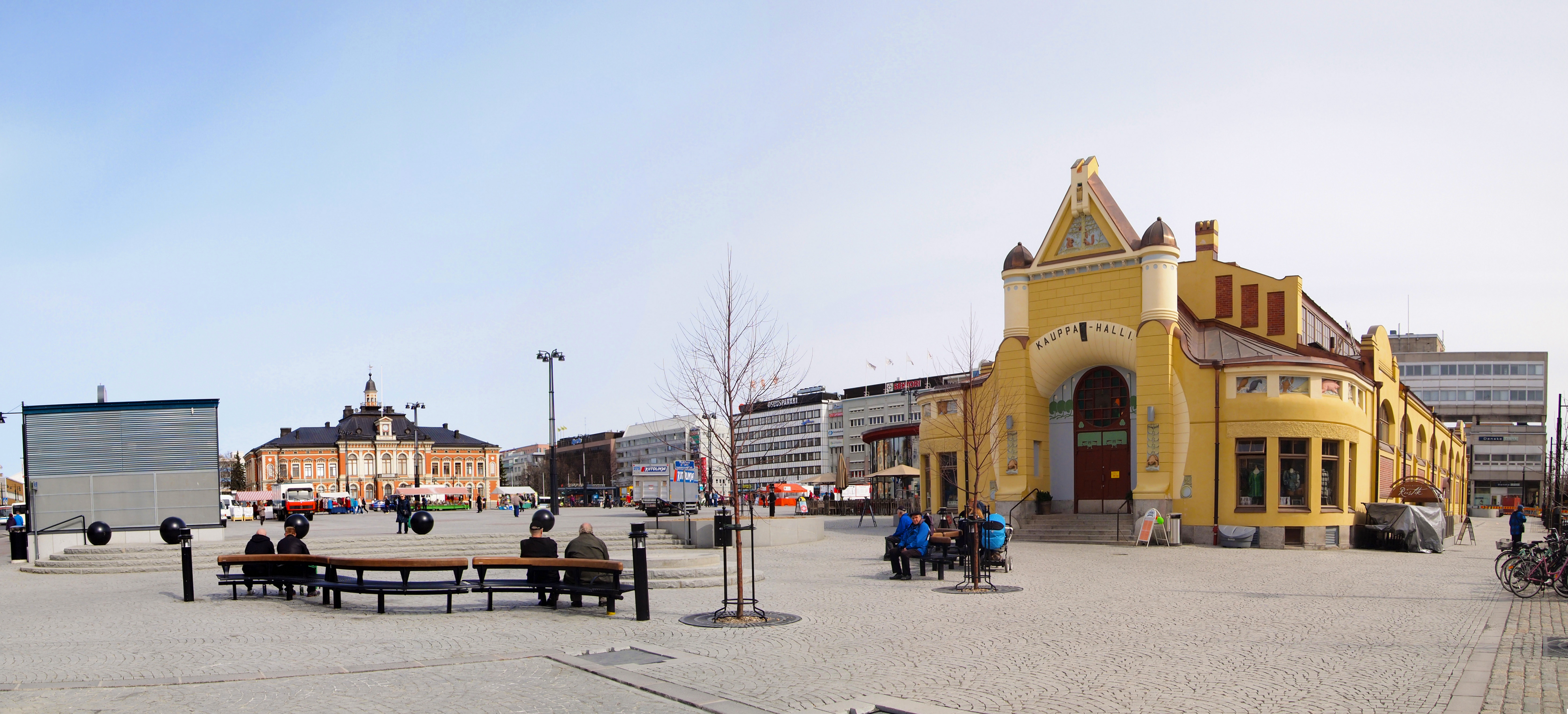
Kuopio Market Square with the Market Hall in foreground and the City Hall in the background

== Sports ==
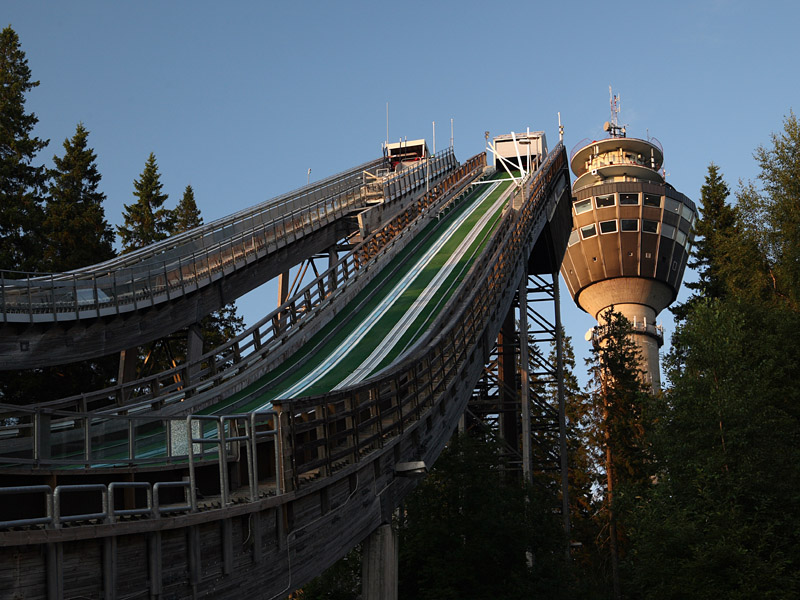
Puijo Ski Jumps with the Observation Tower in the background

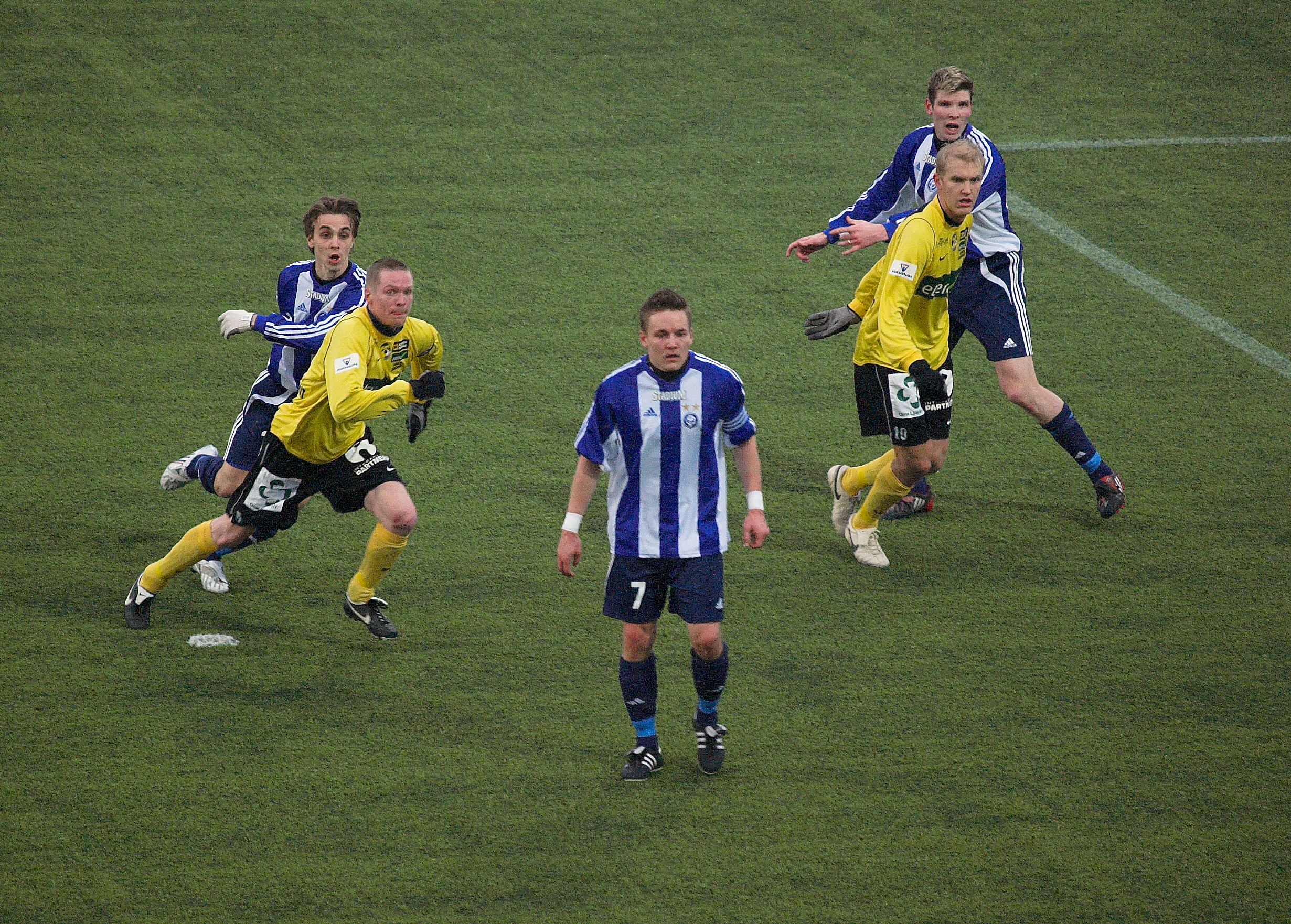
KuPS vs HJK at Magnum Areena, Kuopio. Finnish League Cup, March 11, 2008.

Kuopio bid for the 2012 Winter Youth Olympics, a youth sports festival in the tradition of the Olympics. It became a finalist in November 2008, but ultimately lost to Innsbruck, Austria. Kuopio's image as a small city with a large University and many active young people was considered a model of what the International Olympic Committee seeks for the Games.

- KalPa (ice hockey)
- KuPS (football)
- Kuopion Taitoluistelijat (figure skating)
- Puijon Hiihtoseura (skiing, ski jumping, Nordic combined, biathlon)
- Puijon Pesis (pesäpallo)
- Kuopion Reippaan voimistelijat (gymnastics)
- Finland Ice Marathon (ice skating event)
- Kuopio Steelers (american football)
- Kuopio Skating club, Kuopion Luisteluseura KuLs (figure skating)
- Welhot (floorball)
- Linkki (basketball)

== Transport ==
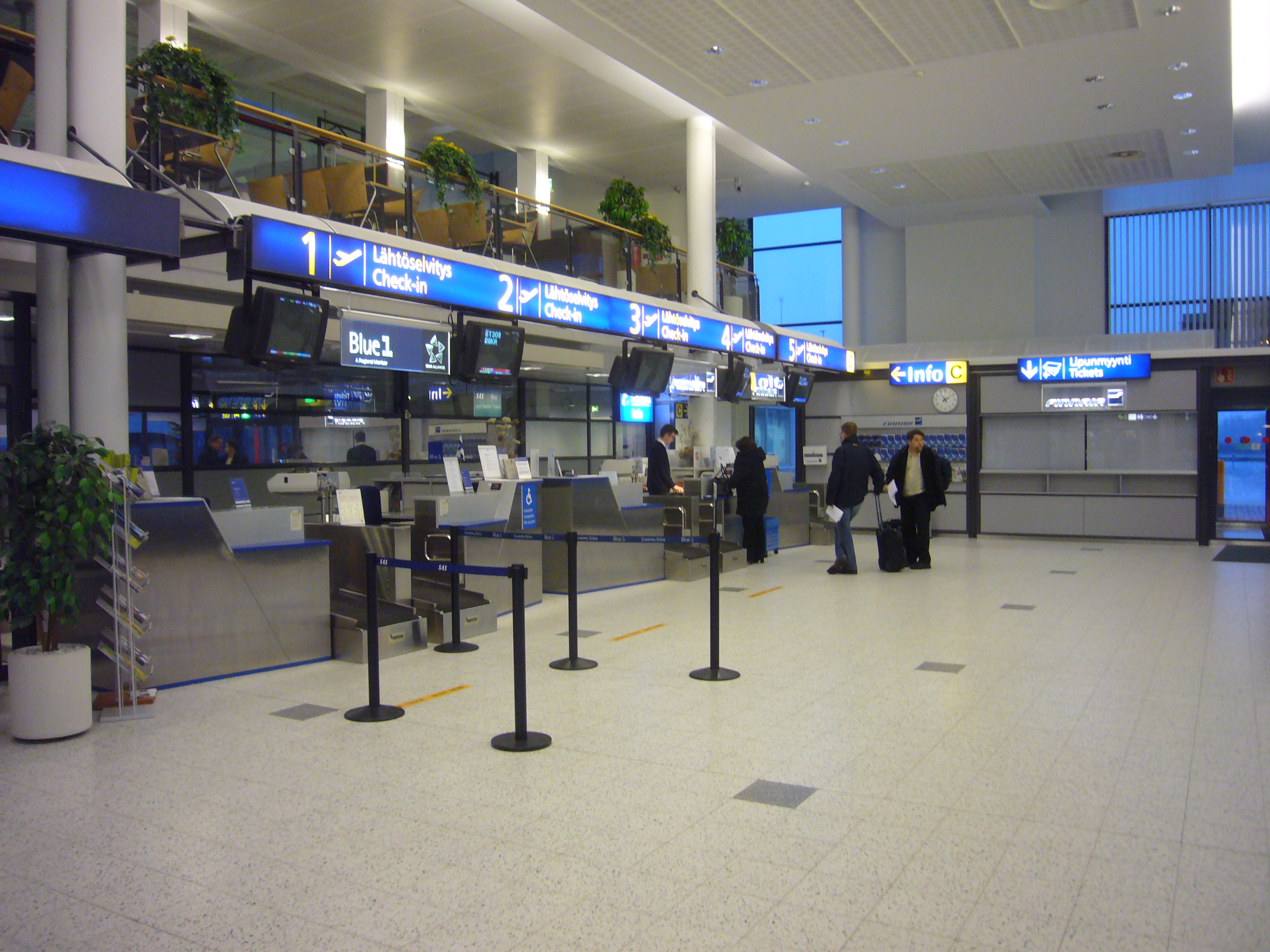
Check-in at Kuopio Airport

The city has a nationally unique feature in its street network, where every other street is reserved for pedestrian and cycle traffic, so-called "rännikatu" (derived from the Swedish gränd, alley). These streets provide pedestrians a calm environment away from vehicular traffic. This setup dates back to Kuopio's first town plan by Pehr Kjellman in 1776. Originally, rännikadut were created as a fire barrier to prevent a possible fire escalating in a mainly wood-constructed city.

Two Finnish highways cross Kuopio: Finnish national road 5 (Vt 5; part of E63 in the northern side of city), which extends south to Helsinki and north to Sodankylä, and Finnish national road 9 (Vt 9; part of E63 in the western side of city), which extends west to Turku and east to the Niirala checkpoint on the Finnish-Russian border. The Blue Highway passes through Kuopio. It is an international tourist route from Mo i Rana, Norway to Pudozh, Russia via Sweden and Finland.

Long-distance transport connections from Kuopio include Pendolino and InterCity trains from Kuopio railway station to several destinations around Finland, operated by VR, as well as multiple daily departures from Kuopio Airport on Finnair to Helsinki. The passenger harbour of the port of Kuopio, located on the shore of Lake Kallavesi, is the busiest port for passenger traffic in the Vuoksi drainage basin and the Finnish Lakeland.

== Education ==
Higher Education in Kuopio
| University | Students |
|---|---|
| University of Eastern Finland | 6 229 |
| Savonia University of Applied Sciences | 5 000 |
| HUMAK University of Applied Sciences | ~150 |
| Sibelius Academy | ~100 |

Kuopio has always been a city of education. Some of the first schools offering education in Finnish (such as the School for the Blind in 1871, and the Trade School in 1887) were established in Kuopio. Currently the most important institutions are the University of Eastern Finland, the Savonia University of Applied Sciences, Vocational College of North Savo and the Kuopio department of the Sibelius Academy. One of the oldest schools in the city is Kuopio Lyceum High School, which was officially established in 1872, but was originally built in 1826 and designed by Carl Ludvig Engel.

Kuopio is known as a strong center of health (e.g. it has the biggest yearly enrollment rate of medical students in Finland), pharmacy, environment, food & nutrition (all legalized Clinical and Public Health Nutritionists in Finland graduate from the University of Eastern Finland), safety (education in Emergency Services is centered in Kuopio) and welfare professions, as the major organisations University of Kuopio (now part of the University of Eastern Finland since January 2010.), Savonia University of Applied Sciences and Technopolis Kuopio are particularly oriented to those areas.

== Notable people ==
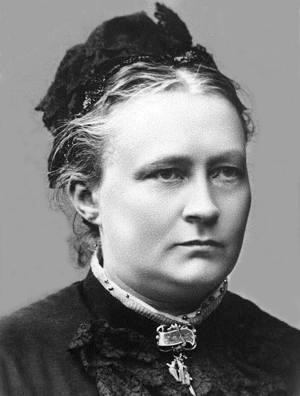
Minna Canth, a writer and a social activist

- Juhani Aho
- Pertti Ahokas
- Martti Ahtisaari
- Minna Canth
- Pekka Halonen
- Janne Happonen
- Matti Hautamäki
- Marko Hietala
- Zachary Hietala
- Olli Jokinen
- Kasperi Kapanen
- Sami Kapanen
- Elina Karjalainen
- Mika Kojonkoski
- H. Olliver Twisted
- Hannes Kolehmainen
- Lasse Lehtinen
- Paavo Lipponen
- Paavo Lötjönen
- Emmi Mäkelin
- Archbishop Leo
- Iivo Niskanen
- Martti Nissinen
- Petri Partanen
- Pertti "Spede" Pasanen
- Paavo Ruotsalainen
- Aarno Ruusuvuori
- Aulis Rytkönen
- Tuomo Saikkonen
- Petros Sasaki
- Päivi Setälä
- Sanna Sillanpää
- Alma (Finnish singer)
- Johan Vilhelm Snellman
- Leena Suhl
- Samuli Suhonen
- Robert Taylor
- Kimmo Timonen
- Janne Tolsa
- Jenni Vartiainen
- Brothers von Wright: Magnus, Wilhelm and Ferdinand
- Ilpo Väisänen

== International relations ==
Kuopio is twinned with 15 cities around the world. It also has one twin county, Lääne-Viru County, Estonia.

=== Twin towns – Sister cities ===
Kuopio is twinned with:

| Győr, Hungary; Minneapolis, United States; Winnipeg, Canada; Jönköping, Sweden; Alūksne, Latvia | Svendborg, Denmark; Pitkyaranta, Russia; Pskov, Russia; Castrop-Rauxel, Germany; Bodø, Norway | Gera, Germany; Besançon, France; Opole, Poland; Craiova, Romania; Shanghai Pudong, China |

== See also ==
- Finnish national road 5
- Kauppakatu
- Kuopio Battalion
- Kuopio Football Club
- The Kuopio Province
- The Kuopio school stabbing
- Kuopio Senior High of Music and Dance
- Nilsiä
- The Puijo Hill
- Siilinjärvi
- University of Eastern Finland
