= Petri Partanen =

Finnish ice hockey forward

- Born: February 26, 1986 (age 40) Kuopio, Finland
- Height: 5 ft 9 in (175 cm)
- Weight: 174 lb (79 kg; 12 st 6 lb)
- Position: Forward
- Shot: Left
- Played for: KalPa
- Playing career: 2007–2014

Petri Partanen (born February 26, 1986) is a Finnish former professional ice hockey forward.

Partanen played three games in the SM-liiga for KalPa during the 2006–07 season where he scored no points. He also played in Mestis for KooKoo and D Team.
