= Vehmersalmi =

Former municipality of Finland

Coordinates: 62°45′40″N 28°01′45″E

Coat of Arms of Vehmersalmi

Vehmersalmi is a former municipality of Finland. It has been a part of the city of Kuopio since January 1, 2005.

It is located in the former province of Eastern Finland and is part of the North Savo region. The municipality had a population of 2,053 (2003) and covered an area of 550.59 km^{2} of which 202.47 km^{2} is water. The population density was 5.9 inhabitants per km^{2}.

The municipality was unilingually Finnish. Vehmersalmi ceased to exist as of 1 January 2005 when it was merged into Kuopio.

== Villages ==
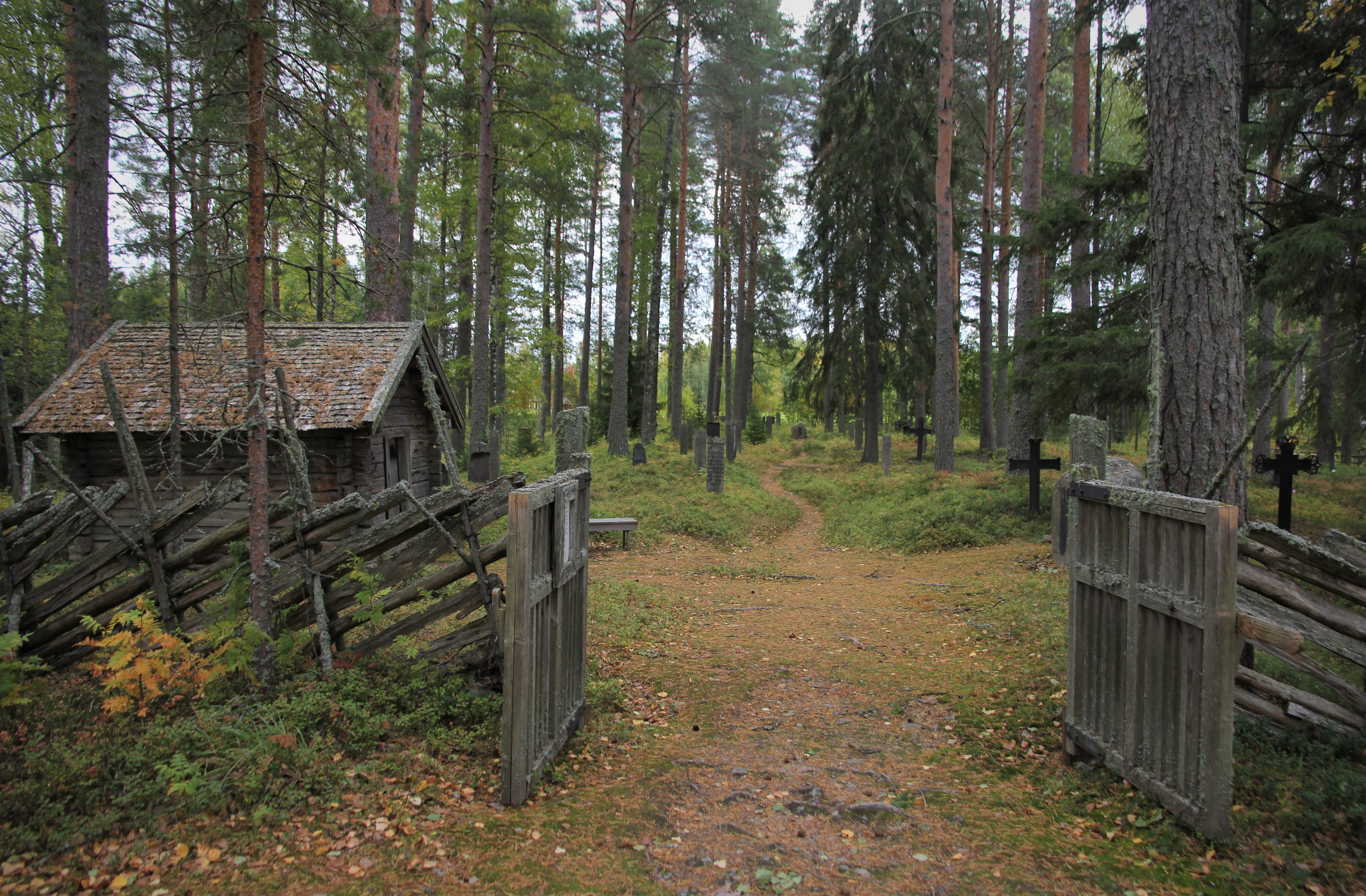
The old Horkanlahti Cemetery in Vehmersalmi

Enonlahti, Horsmanlahti, Juonionlahti, Jänissalo, Litmaniemi, Miettilä, Niinimäki, Putroniemi, Puutosmäki, Ritoniemi, Roikansaari, Räsälä, Vuorisalo, Mustinlahti and Kohma.

== Culture ==
=== Food ===
In the 1980s, stockfish soup was considered the traditional food of the former parish of Vehmersalmi.
