= Port of Kuopio =

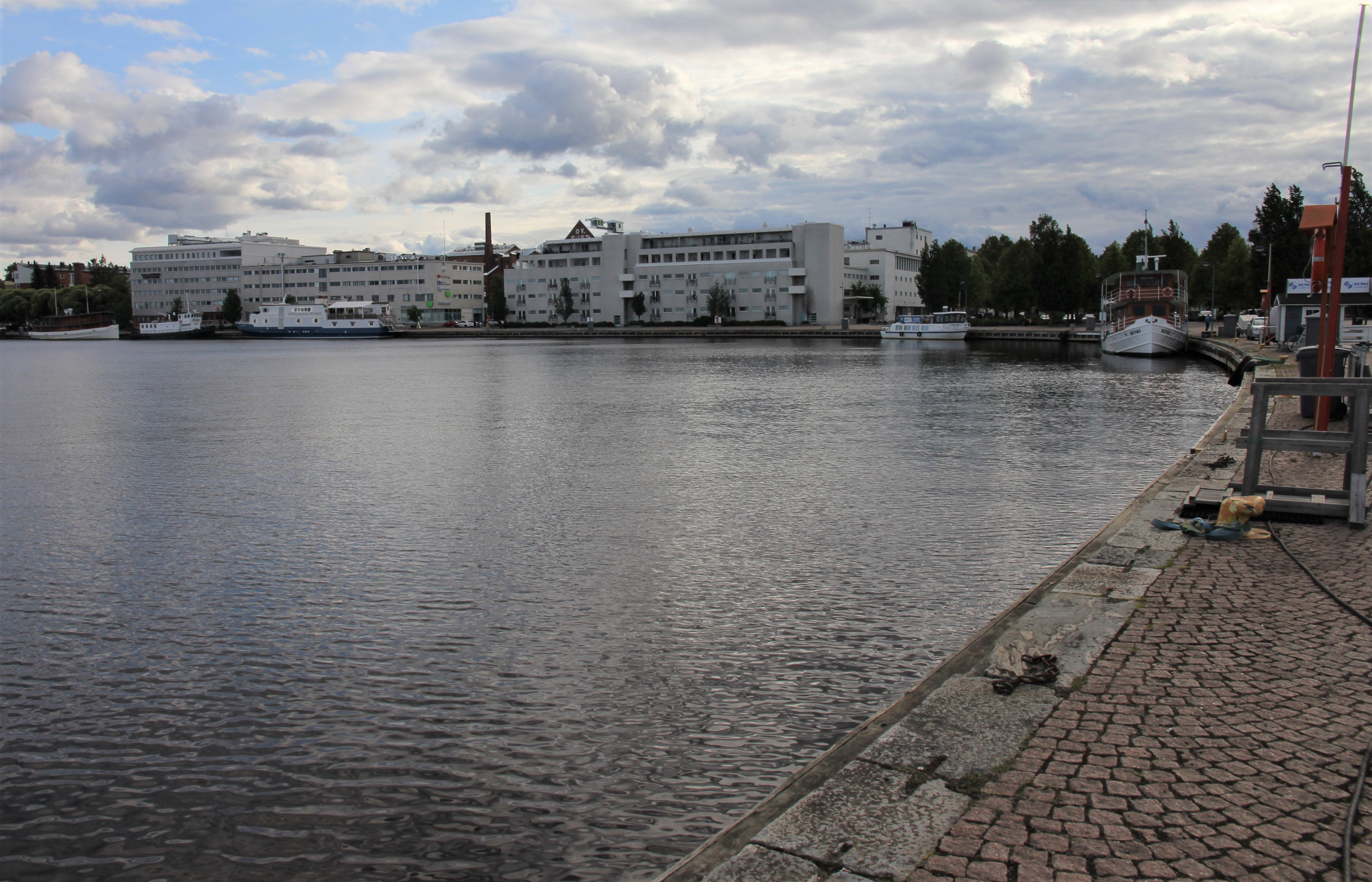
- Harbour in the Vahtivuori, Kuopio
- Click on the map for a fullscreen view
- Port of Kuopio (Finland)
- Native name: Kuopion satama

Location
- Country: Finland
- Location: Kuopio
- Coordinates: 62.893165°N 27.698160°E
- UN/LOCODE: FI KUO

Details
- Type of harbour: inland natural

The Port of Kuopio (Finnish: Kuopion satama) is an inland harbour in the city of Kuopio, Finland, on the shore of Lake Kallavesi. The passenger harbour of the port is located in the Vahtivuori district on the Maljalahti bay. The cargo harbour for the cargo ship traffic is located in the Haapaniemi district, about two kilometers southwest of the passenger harbour.

Kuopio's passenger harbour is the busiest port for passenger traffic in the Vuoksi drainage basin and the Lake Finland. There are many cruise companies and restaurants, and in addition, the harbor has market stalls. The Kuopio Wine Festival is held at this market square near the harbour. The passenger harbour area is one of the centers of summer tourist activities alongside Kuopio Market Square. The harbour is often filled with walkers admiring Lake Kallavesi, market traders, diners on the terrace and those going on a cruise.

== See also ==
- Port of Lappeenranta
