= Kuopiorock =

Annual rock music festival in Kuopio, Finland

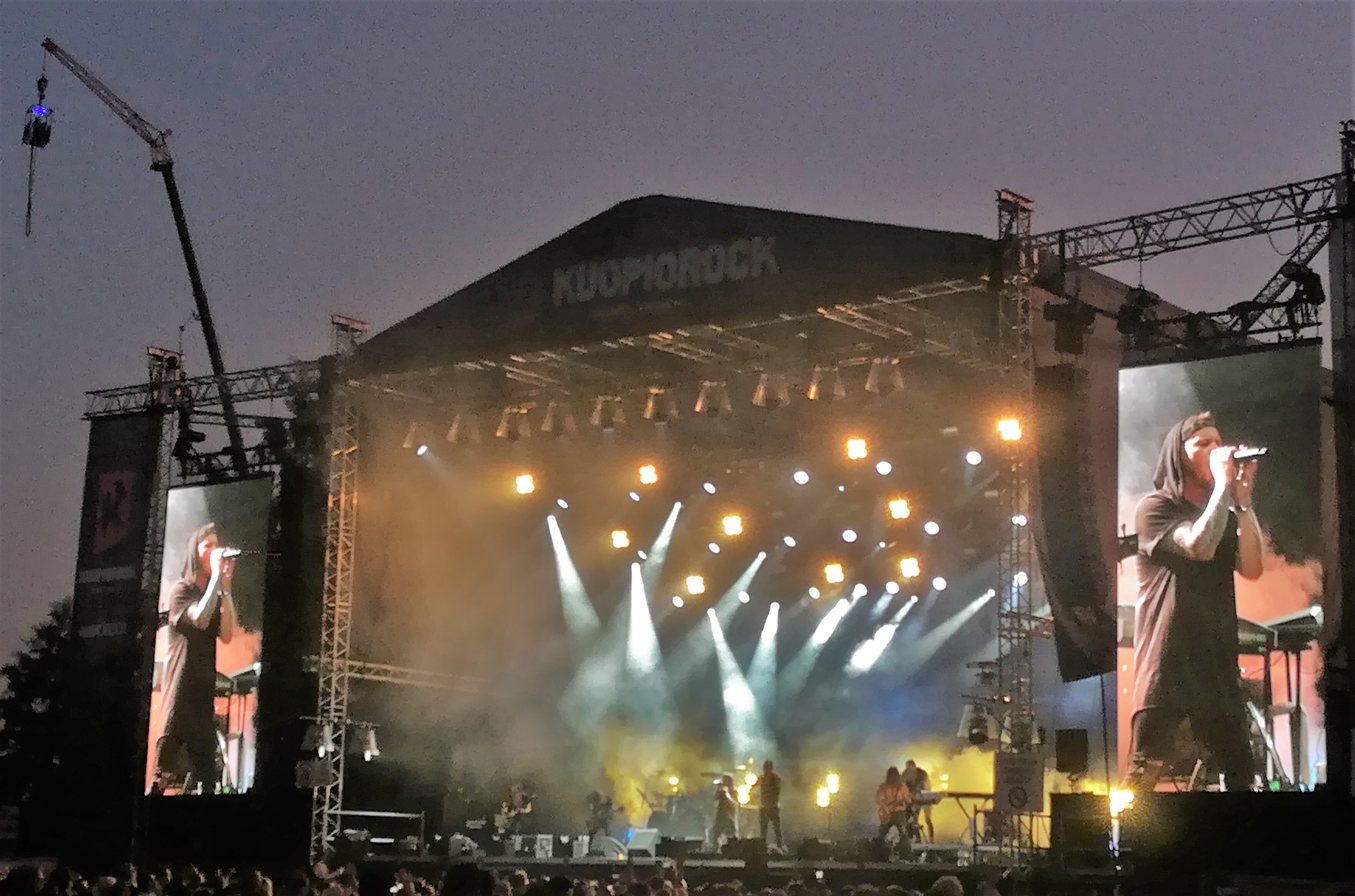
Concert at the 2018 Kuopiorock

Kuopiorock (also Kuopio Rockcock or simply Rockcock) is a Finnish two- to three-day rock music festival held annually in Väinölänniemi, Kuopio, at the turn of July and August. The first event was held in 2003. In 2012, the event celebrated its 10th anniversary and the festival was held on 27–28 July.

In connection with the event, there is a Campcock campsite. Väinölänniemi will be fenced throughout the event. In addition, several club gigs will be played around the city of Kuopio and a band race will be held in early summer, with the winner getting to perform in Rockcock. In 2006, Rockcock's novelty was Hevikaraoke. By 2007, the festival's event area expanded to include large Väinölänniemi Beach in the shore of Lake Kallavesi and the park area at the base of the peninsula, and the Peräniemi casino was added as a fourth stage. In 2012, the performance stage, located on the beach across the road, was moved to the sports stadium as the main stage.

In 2015, a fifth stage, Väinö Stage, was added to Kuopiorock, which is located on the beach next to Cafe Väinö.

As the event expands, alternative venues have also been considered. One of the proposed sites is the Sorsasalo racetrack, which would reduce noise and litter nuisance to the surrounding population, but the location would be more difficult to reach. With the advent of the 2010s, criticism and talk of the event has subsided.

== Main acts ==
2007

- Sepultura

2008

- Cradle of Filth

2009

- Misfits
- Kreator

2010

- The Baseballs

2011

- Danko Jones
- W.A.S.P.

2012

- Nightwish

2013

- Helloween

2014

- Scorpions

2015

- Accept
- Children of Bodom

2016

- Whitesnake

2017

- Megadeth

2018

- Billy Idol
- Helloween

2019

- The Offspring
- Sabaton

2021

- Nightwish
- Within Temptation

2022

- Amorphis

2023

- Megadeth
- Ville Valo

2024

- The Prodigy
- Gene Simmons Band

2025

- D-A-D

== See also ==
- Ilosaarirock
