= Rönö =

City district in Kuopio, Finland

Coordinates: 62°52′45.8″N 27°42′38.9″E

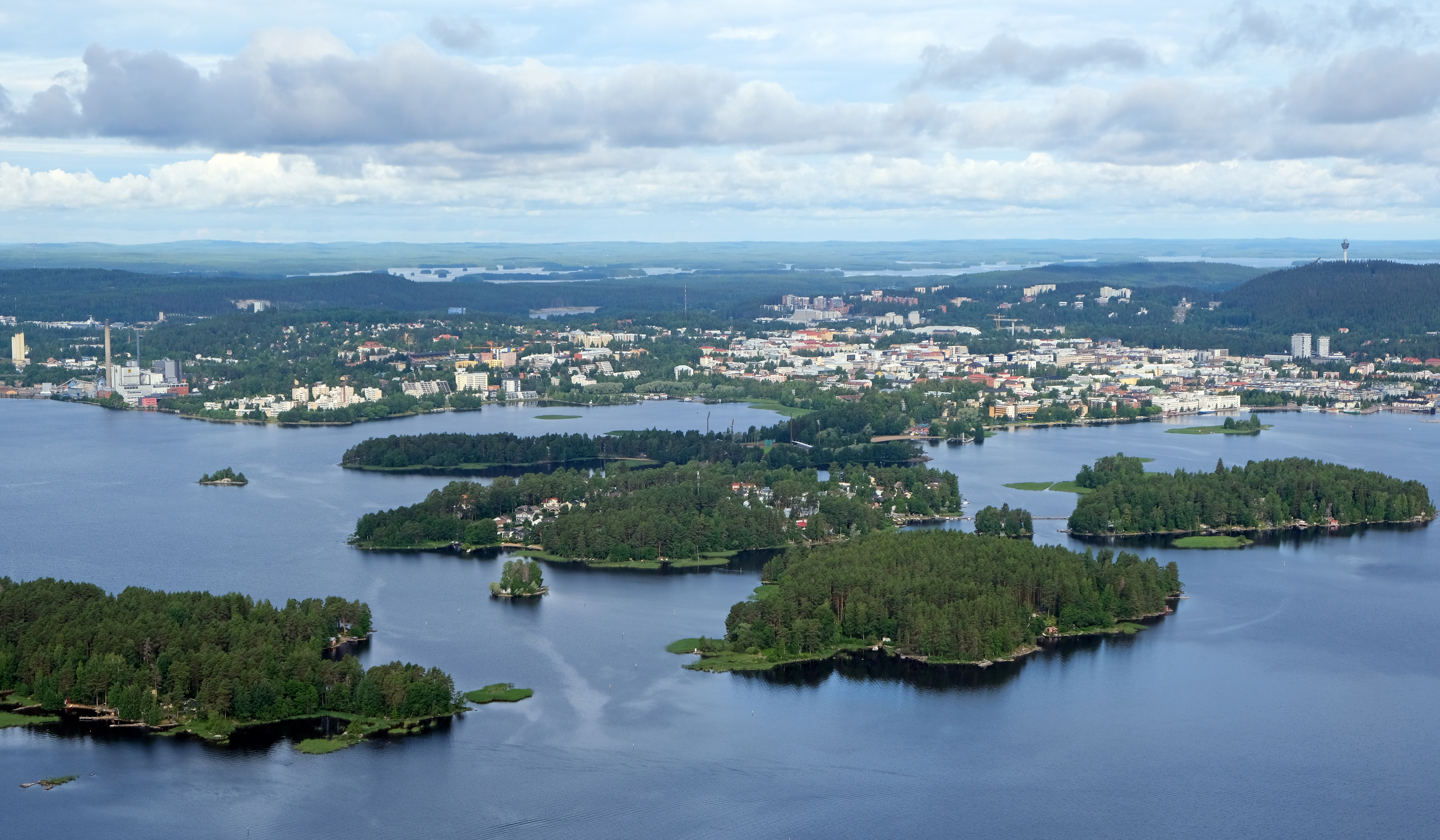
An aerial view of Rönö

Rönö (Finnish: [ˈrønø]) is an island in Lake Kallavesi and also a district in the city of Kuopio, Finland. It is located about 2,5 kilometers southeast of Kuopio Market Square, measured along the street network. Since 1988, the island has been connected to Väinölänniemi by a bridge. Rönö is a sought-after residential area and is one of the most expensive areas in Kuopio, along with the archipelago estates in Saaristokaupunki. Only detached, semi-detached and terraced houses have been built there. Most of the island was built during the boom of art in the 1980s and 1990s, but houses have also been built in the 2000s, and a few estates are still completely undeveloped. By the decision of the city council, tenant houses were once built on the highest point of Rönö.

Rönö is the only areas in Kuopio where the average annual income of households exceeds €100,000. On the southwest coast of the island, the average income is up to €230,000. There are few elderly people living in the area, but there are many small families. The average size of households is 2,2–2,9 people.

In addition to the main island, the Rönö district includes islands called Honkasaari, Lehtosaari, Varvisaari and Tiilissaari, as well as a few smaller islands. Of these, there is a bridge connection to Varvisaari from Rönö. On January 1, 2008, there were only 15 jobs in Rönö and its neighboring islands. This illustrates the emphasis of the area almost entirely on residential and recreational use, so there are no stores or kiosks in the area. The nearest similar, summer and bespoke restaurant called Peräniemi Casino, is located on the edge of Väinölänniemi opposite Rönö. Bus traffic to the area is limited to daytime, between 7 and 16 p.m. With the exception of Rönö Island, the district is part of the Kuopio National City Park, established in December 2017.

== Sources ==
=== Literature ===
- Tiina Mertanen & Taru Heikkinen: Silta Rönöön, pappilan torpasta luksuslähiöksi. 1990. Kuopion kulttuurihistoriallisen museon julkaisuja 9. (in Finnish)
