= Puijo tower =

Observation tower in Kuopio, Finland

Puijo Tower
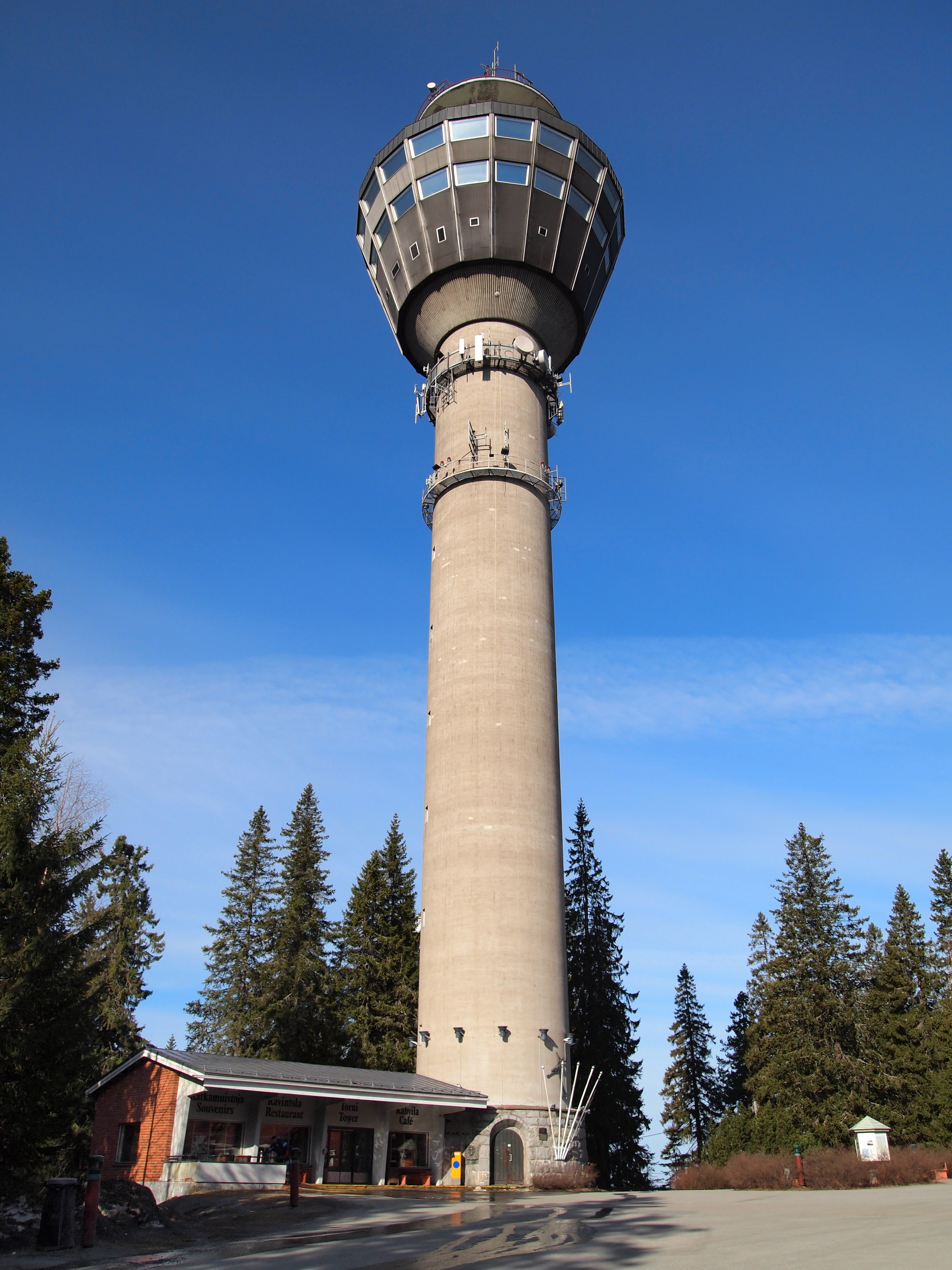
- Interactive map of the Puijo Tower area

General information
- Type: Observation, restaurant
- Location: Kuopio, Finland
- Coordinates: 62°54′34″N 027°39′21″E
- Completed: 27 July 1963

Height
- Antenna spire: 75.0 m (246.1 ft)

Design and construction
- Architect: Seppo Ruotsalainen

The Puijo tower is an observation tower at the top of Puijo hill in Kuopio, Eastern Finland. Opened in 1963, the tower is 75 metres (246 ft) tall and has a revolving restaurant with 100 seats. It was the first tower with a revolving restaurant in the Nordic countries. The restaurant was an inspiration to Erkki Lindfors, the mayor of Tampere, who got the idea to build a similar one in his home town, resulting in the Näsinneula tower, which opened in 1971. The current Puijo tower has been visited by over 5.5 million tourists.

The current tower is the third overall. When it was completed on 27 July 1963, the second one, built in 1906, was dismantled. The first tower was built in 1856. On the western side of the tower there are three ski jumping hills.

== Gallery ==
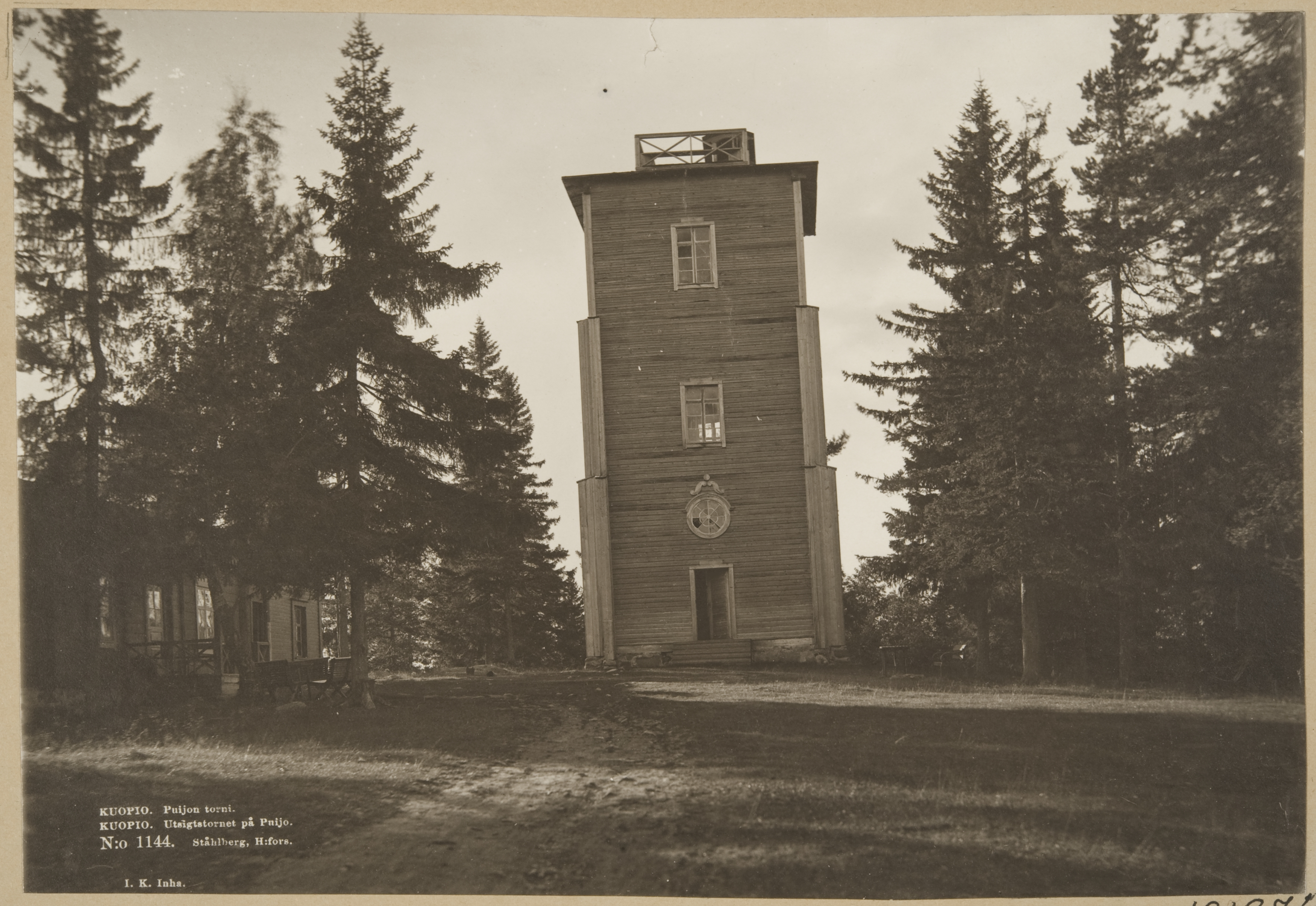
The first Puijo tower, c. 1893

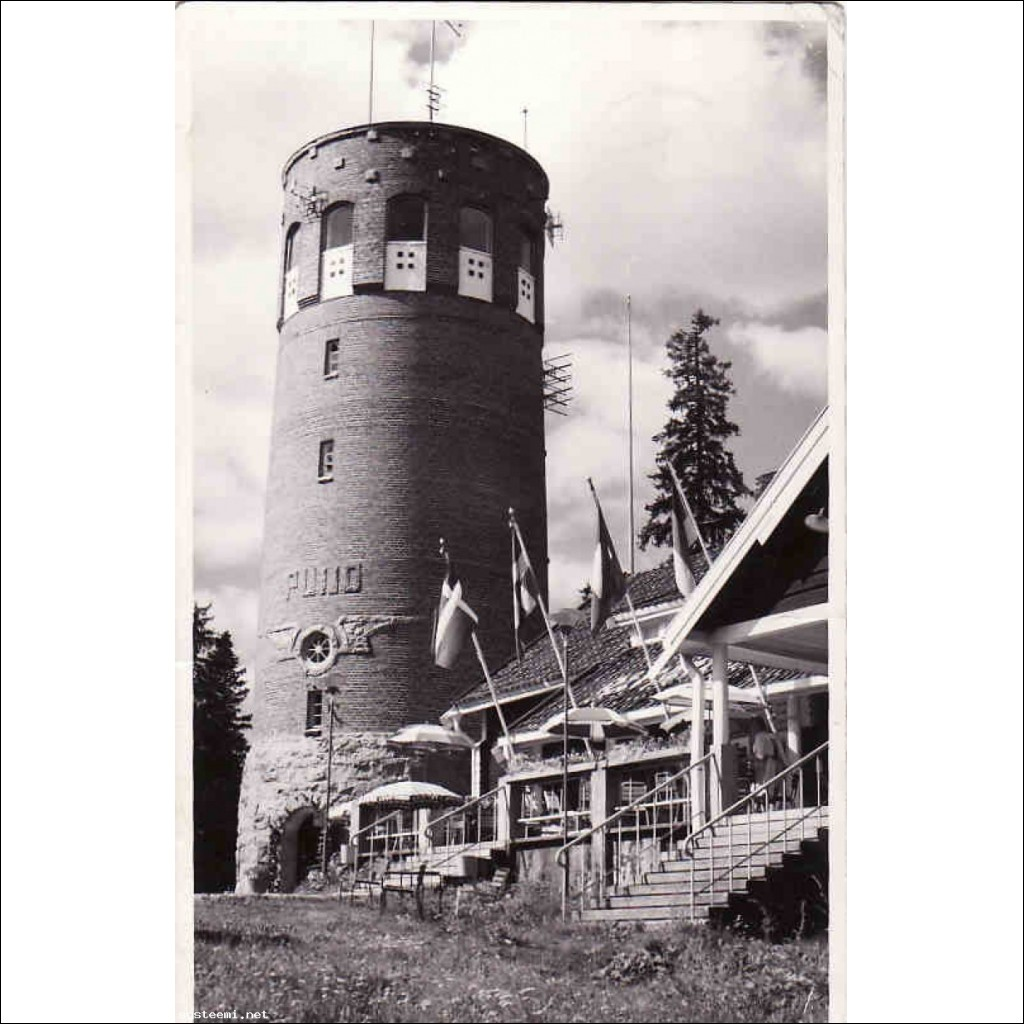
The second Puijo tower, built in 1900

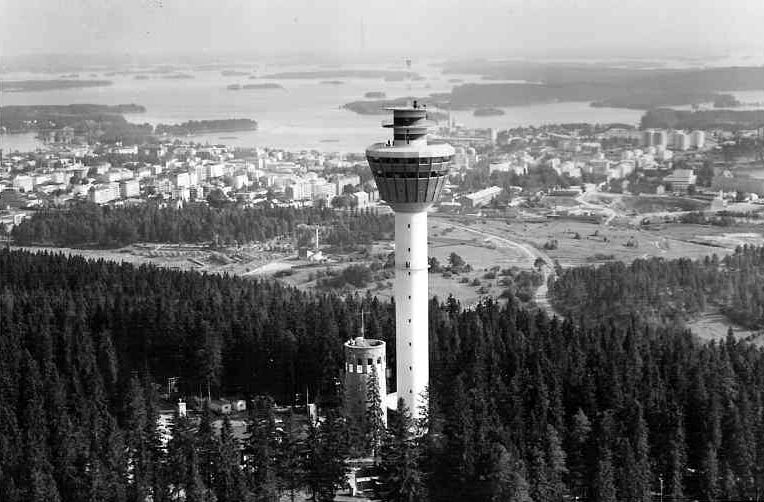
Both the second and third Puijo towers in 1963. The new tower had just been completed and the old one was to be dismantled.

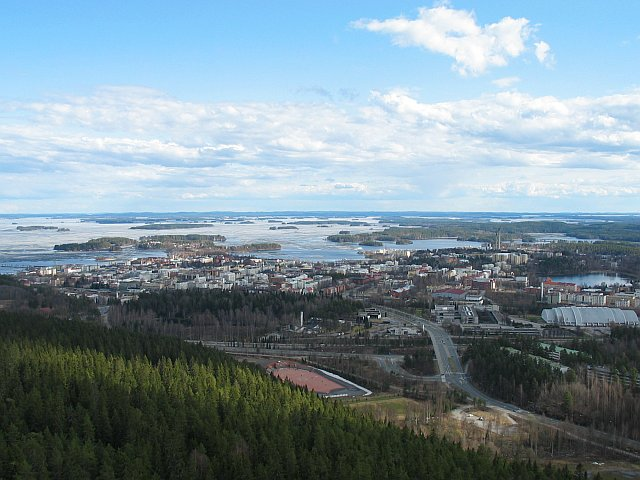
View of central Kuopio from the tower, 2003

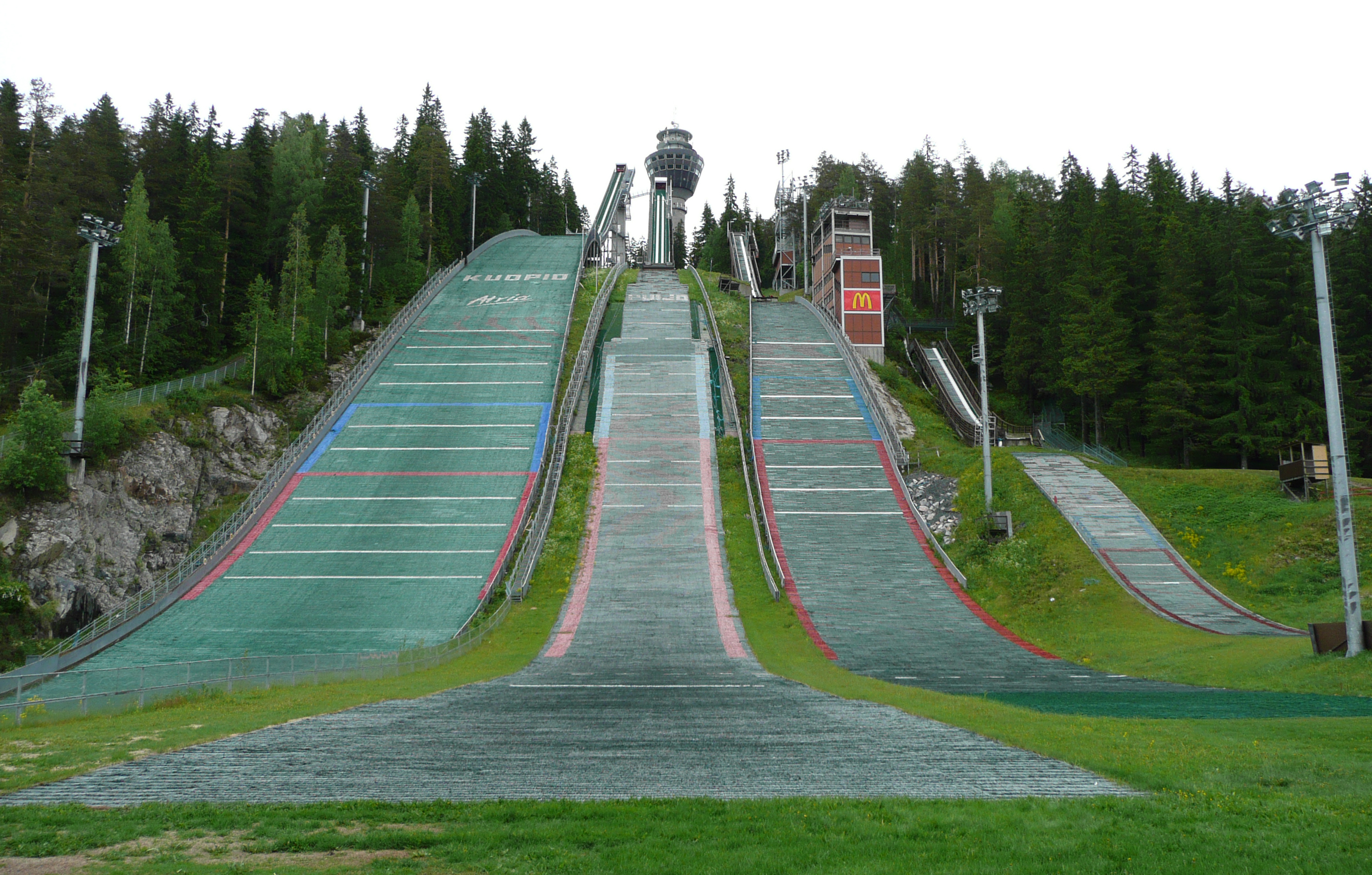
The ski jumping hills and Puijo tower, 2008

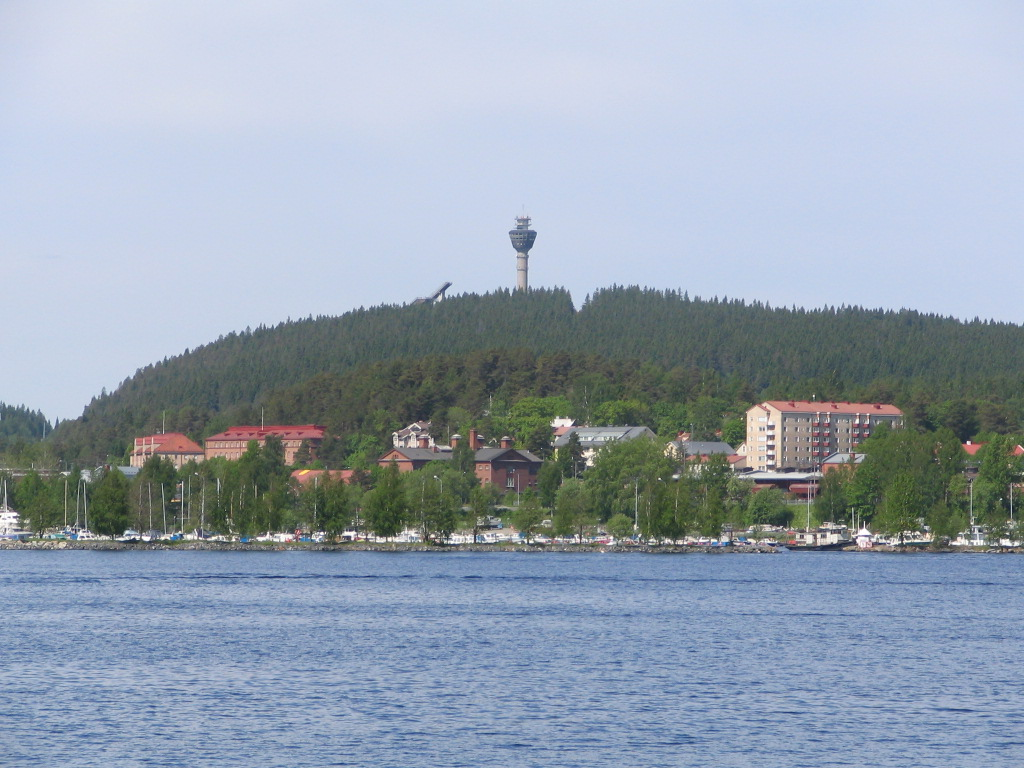
Puijo hill and the tower pictured from Kallavesi lake, 2005
