= Kuopion Reippaan Voimistelijat =

Kuopion Reippaan Voimistelijat is a sports club in Kuopio, Finland. It was constituted in 1906 as Kuopion Reipas Ry. It is the only existing sports union that still bears the name Kuopion Reipas, but it has had a difficult time connecting to the origins of its roots.

The club was created when Kuopion Raittiusseuran Miesvoimistelijat and Kuopion Voimistelijat ja Rautatieläisten voimisteluseura united. The new name was Kuopion Reipas, and it offered skiing, wrestling, sports, gymnastics and football.

After 1918, the Kuopion Reipas union dispersed, and new sports unions were formed Kuopion Urheilu-Veikot (1920), Kuopion Palloseura ja vuonna (1923) and Puijon Hiihtoseura (1930). The remaining ladies gymnastics division wanted to preserve the traditional Kuopion Reipas name and adopted the name Kuopion Reippaan Naisvoimistelijat ry. In beginning of the 21st century, sport unions wanted to return to the concept of unisex gymnastics sport unions as it was before. This was due to the male gymnastics unions that were formed as subsidiaries in 1990s. The name was changed back to Kuopion Reippaan Voimistelijat to accommodate both male and female gymnastic enthusiasts. The sports union Kuopion Reippaan Voimistelijat has around 1,300 paid members, and it is the largest sport union in Kuopio.

In 1906–1907, the runner from Kuopio Hannes Kolehmainen represented Kuopion Reipas.
