= Väinölänniemi =

City district in Kuopio, Finland

Coordinates: 62°53′17″N 27°41′24″E

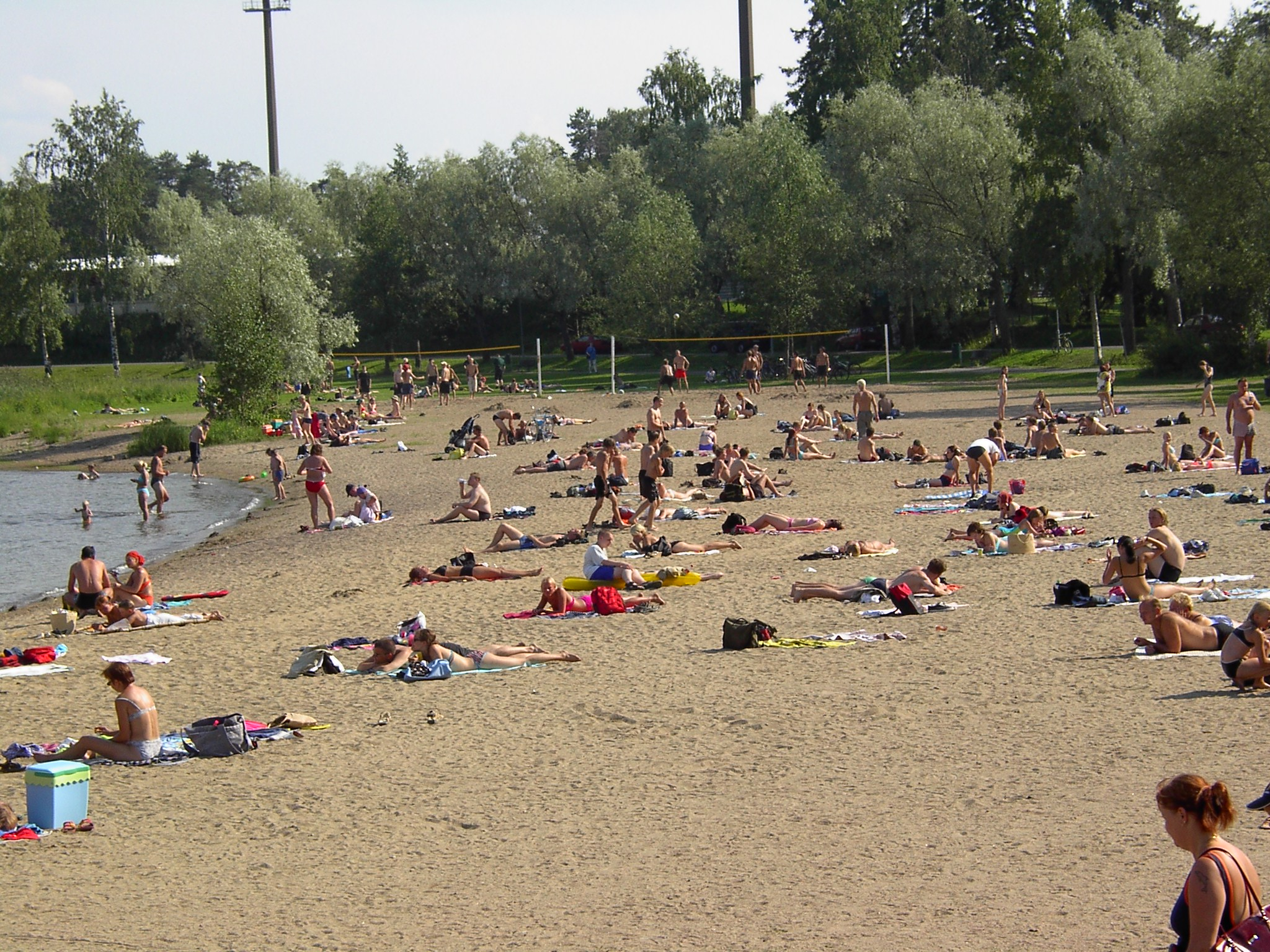
The Väinölänniemi Beach

Väinölänniemi is a district in the city of Kuopio, Finland. It is more commonly known for the Väinölänniemi Peninsula (nicknamed Vänäri), located in this district and surrounded by Kallavesi, with its beaches, sports fields and park areas.

The area includes J. V. Snellman Home Museum, Kallavesi High School, Kanttila (Home of Minna Canth), Old Kuopio Museum, Kuopio Provincial Government Building, Kuopio Academy of Design, St. Nicholas Cathedral, VB Photography Center, and the three parks: Väinölänniemi Park, Piispanpuisto and Brahe Park. There is also a prestigious Musta Lammas Restaurant and Hotel Scandic Kuopio.

== See also ==
- Kuopiorock
- Rönö
