= Linkki =

- Founded: 1967
- Location: Kuopio, Finland
- Team colors
- Website: https://linkki.fi/

Linkki is a basketball club in Finland, based in Kuopio. Its men's representative team and the A-boys' teams played in the men's league series in the 2019–2020 season. At its best, Linkki's men's representative team has played at the second highest league level, the First Division, in the 1980s and 1990s. Linkki has a men's team in the central area fitness series for the 2021–22 season, with three boys' teams in different age groups. In addition to the women's team, the club, like the boys, has three junior-age teams for the girls and an adult fitness basketball and a senior basketball.

Linkki was founded on May 12, 1967, and was the first basketball special club in Kuopio and Northern Savonia. The club set a record for its membership (324) in 1993. The link rose for the first time in the Men's First Division for the period 1980-1981 but fell to a lower league level after one season. A new ascent to the First Division took place in the 1990s, when the club was close to ascending to the Men's Finnish Championships series. At the turn of the 1980s and 1990s, Linkki also played in the Finnish Championships in wheelchair basketball, finishing fourth at best.
