= Pirtti =

City district in Kuopio, Finland

Coordinates: 62°49′43″N 27°39′49″E

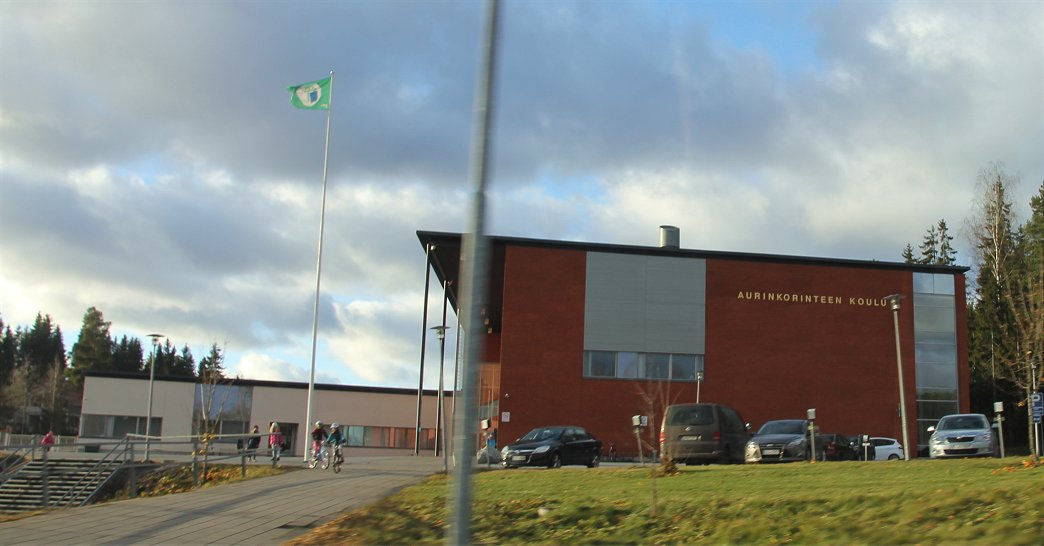
The Aurinkorinne School in Pirtti

Pirtti (Finnish pronunciation: [ˈpirtːi]) is a district of Kuopio, Finland. It belongs to the larger subdivision of Petonen, and it is located about 10 kilometers from the center of Kuopio. At the beginning of 2015, the district had a population of 5,480.

New housing and services are being built in Pirtti all the time with the construction and expansion of Saaristokaupunki. There are about 300 jobs in the area (January 1, 2008). In the area is the Pirtti School, which was built in 1998 and has about a little over 500 students. The Aurinkorinne School is also in the area of the Pirtti district.
