= Haapaniemi =

City district in Kuopio, Finland

Coordinates: 62°52′51″N 27°40′14″E

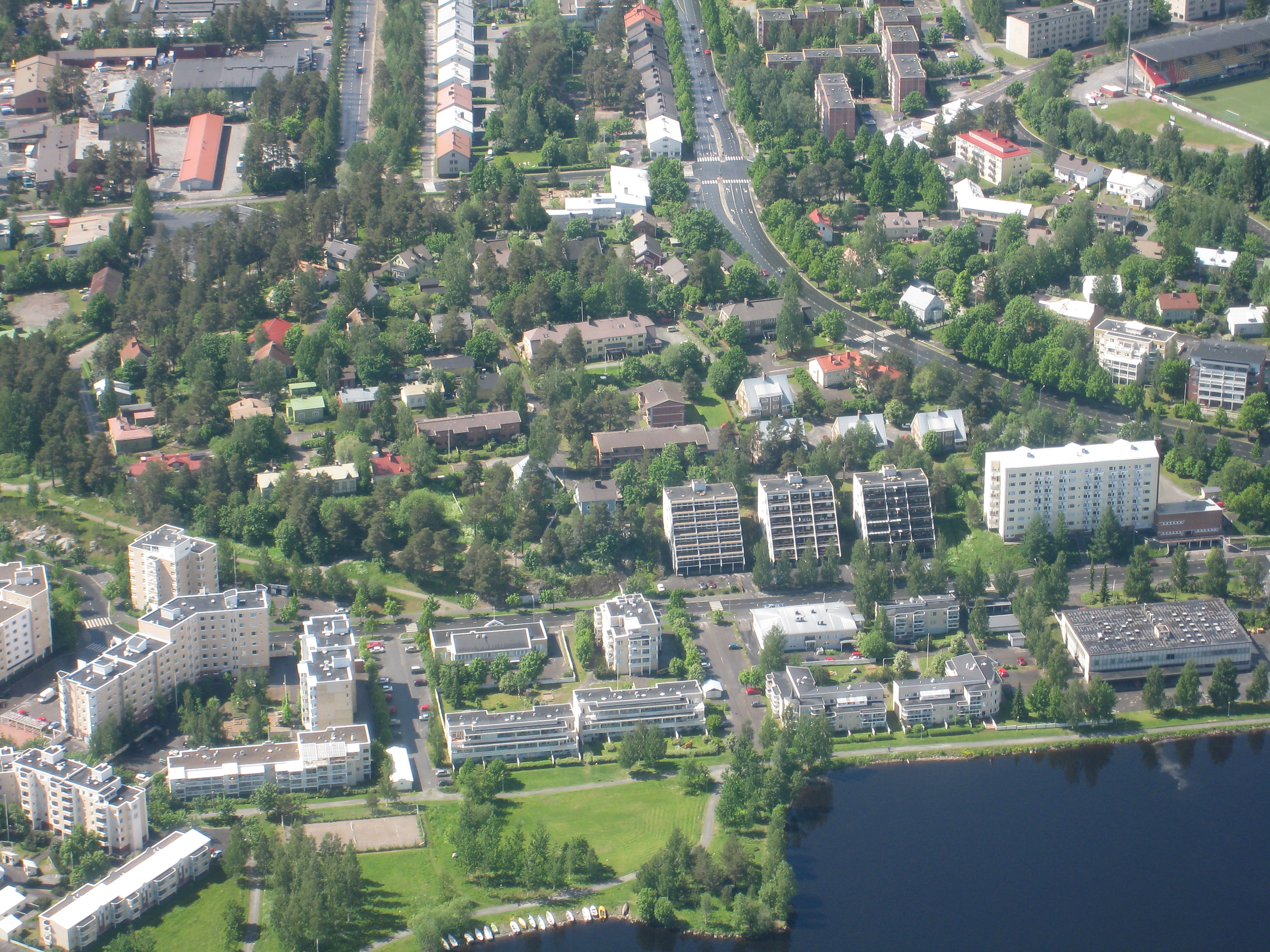
An aerial view of Haapaniemi

Haapaniemi is a district in the city of Kuopio, Finland. It is located south of downtown, about a mile from the market square. The district has a population of about 4,000. The northern end of Saaristokatu, which runs to the archipelago city, leads to Haapaniemi, as does the southern ramp leading to the center of the motorway.

A villa district was designed in the area in an architectural competition held in 1899, which was won by architect Lars Sonck for Haapaniemi. On the basis of the competition entries, a draft town plan was prepared for the area, which was followed. However, the entry of industrial plants into the area in the early 20th century buried the idea of a villa district and housing was created for the working population in the area.

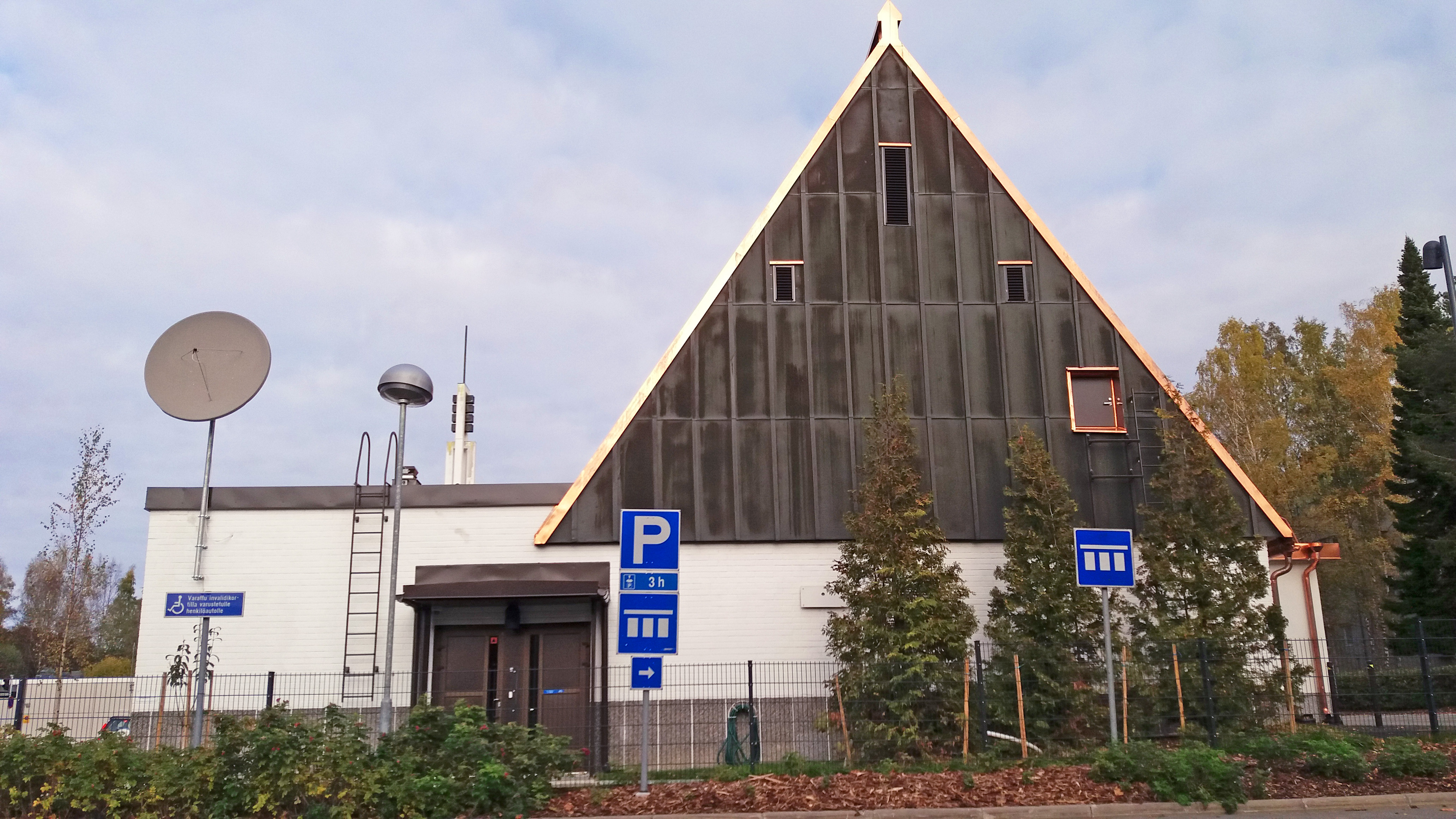
An LDS Church meetinghouse in Haapaniemi

The area includes the Haapaniemi Power Plant of Kuopio Energia, and Kuopio University Hospital. The cargo ship harbour of the port of Kuopio is located in Haapaniemi.
