= Samuli Suhonen =

Finnish ice hockey player

- Born: 7 January 1980 (age 45); Kuopio, Finland
- Height: 5 ft 10 in (178 cm)
- Weight: 183 lb (83 kg; 13 st 1 lb)
- Position: Defence
- Shot: Left
- Played for: KalPa; Espoo Blues; Lahti Pelicans; Modo Hockey
- NHL draft: Undrafted
- Playing career: 2000–2011

Samuli Suhonen (born 7 January 1980) is a Finnish former professional ice hockey defenceman who played in the SM-liiga and Swedish Hockey League (SHL).
