= Puijo (hill) =

Hill in Kuopio, Finland

Coordinates: 62°54′34″N 027°39′21″E

Puijo is a 150-metre-high (490 ft) hill, the famous landmark of city of Kuopio in Finland and a tourist attraction. It is located near the Puijonlaakso district.

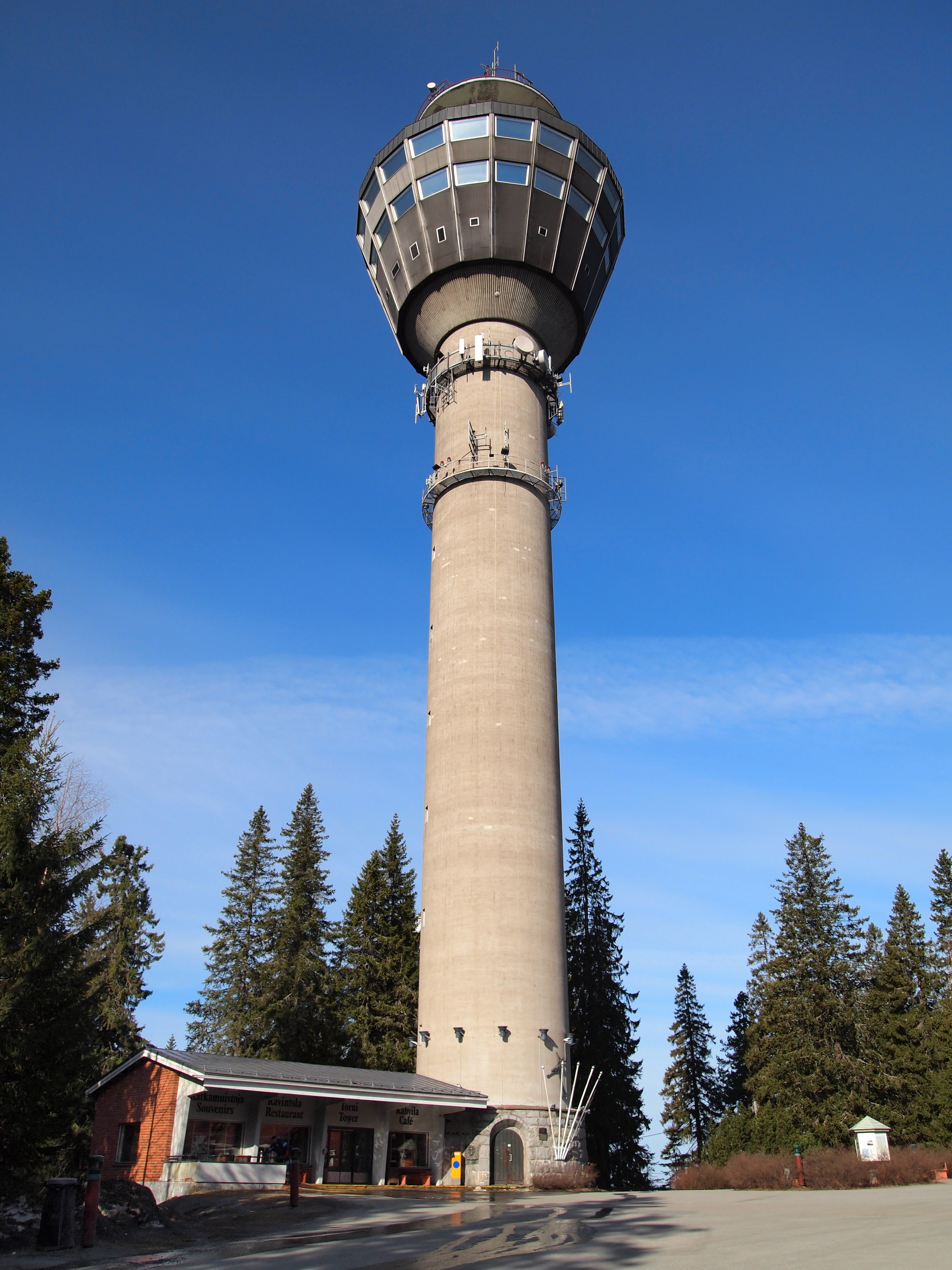
Puijo Tower

== Puijo Ridge ==
The ridge of Puijo is a recreation area. A 75-metre-tall (246 ft) observation tower, Puijo tower, is atop the hill, near the city centre of Kuopio. The tower affords a mosaic of blue lakes and green islands and a large primeval forest. A revolving panoramic restaurant is located at the top of tower, featuring local specialities.

Many paths and a large track network are located on the ridge, including two nature trails. People can move freely on most of Puijo ridge, but are restricted to the paths in the nature conservation area and in some areas less resistant to use. Gathering of plants is allowed.

Puijo and nearby resort town of Tahkovuori have some co-operative programs to promote sports and tourism.

== Conservation area ==
In Puijo area there is one of the first nature conservation areas of Finland, it was established in 1928. The size of the area is currently about 2.08 square kilometres.

== Sports infrastructure ==
Puijo is a diversified winter sports centre and has annually winter sports events, including cross-country skiing, ski jumping and downhill skiing. It is a training centre of many international ski jumpers. Puijo is an internationally known as a venue for Nordic Ski Jumping World Cup events and its ski jumpers. Puijo has two downhill skiing runs, one of which is for beginners.

Puijo is integral to Kuopio's bid for the 2012 Winter Youth Olympics.
