= List of cathedrals in Finland =

This is the list of cathedrals in Finland sorted by denomination.

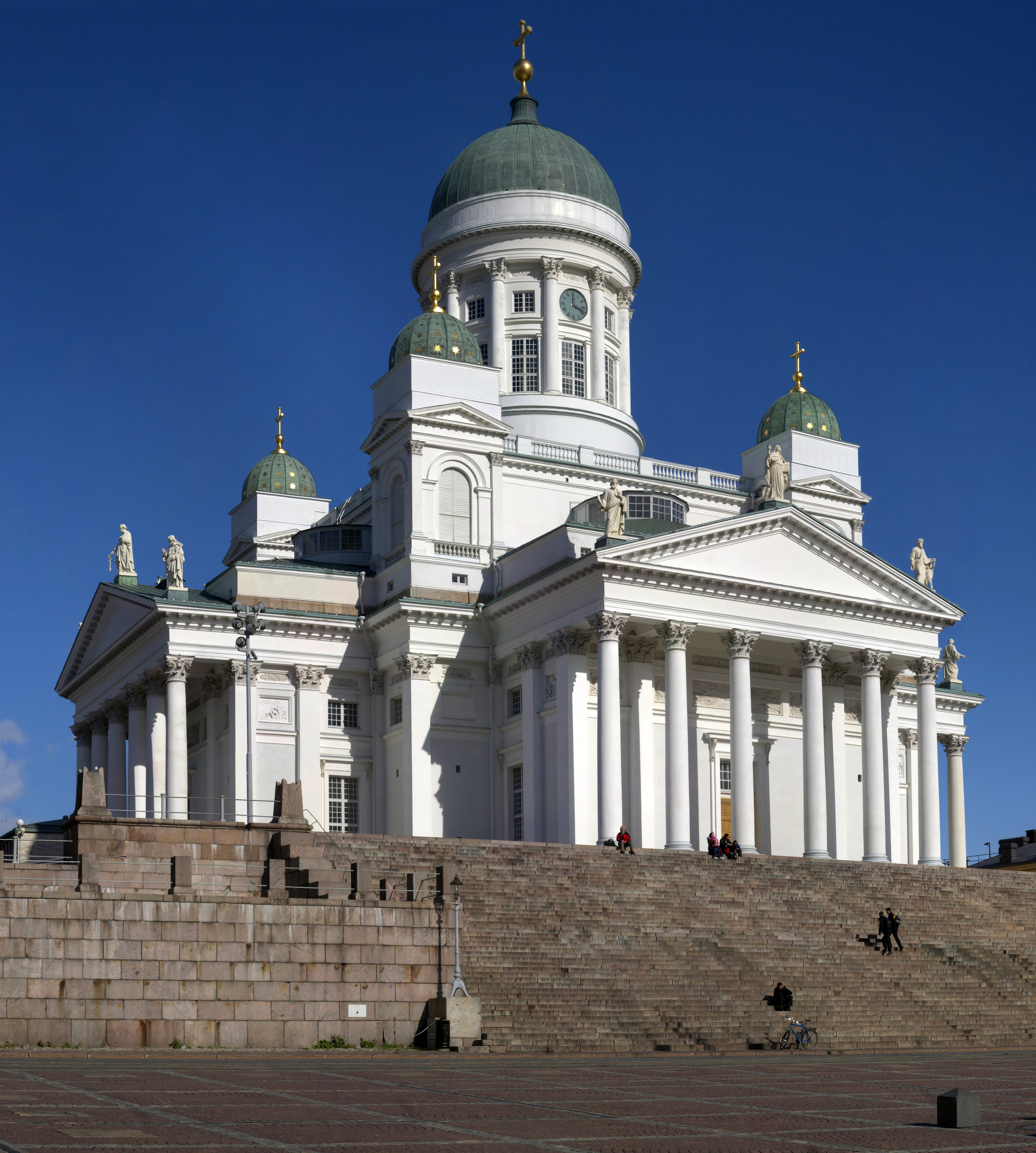
Helsinki Cathedral

== Lutheran ==
Cathedrals of the Evangelical Lutheran Church of Finland:

- Espoo Cathedral in Espoo
- Helsinki Cathedral in Helsinki
- Kuopio Cathedral in Kuopio
- Lapua Cathedral in Lapua
- Mikkeli Cathedral in Mikkeli
- Oulu Cathedral in Oulu
- Porvoo Cathedral in Porvoo
- Savonlinna Cathedral in Savonlinna
- Tampere Cathedral in Tampere
- Turku Cathedral in Turku

== Eastern Orthodox ==
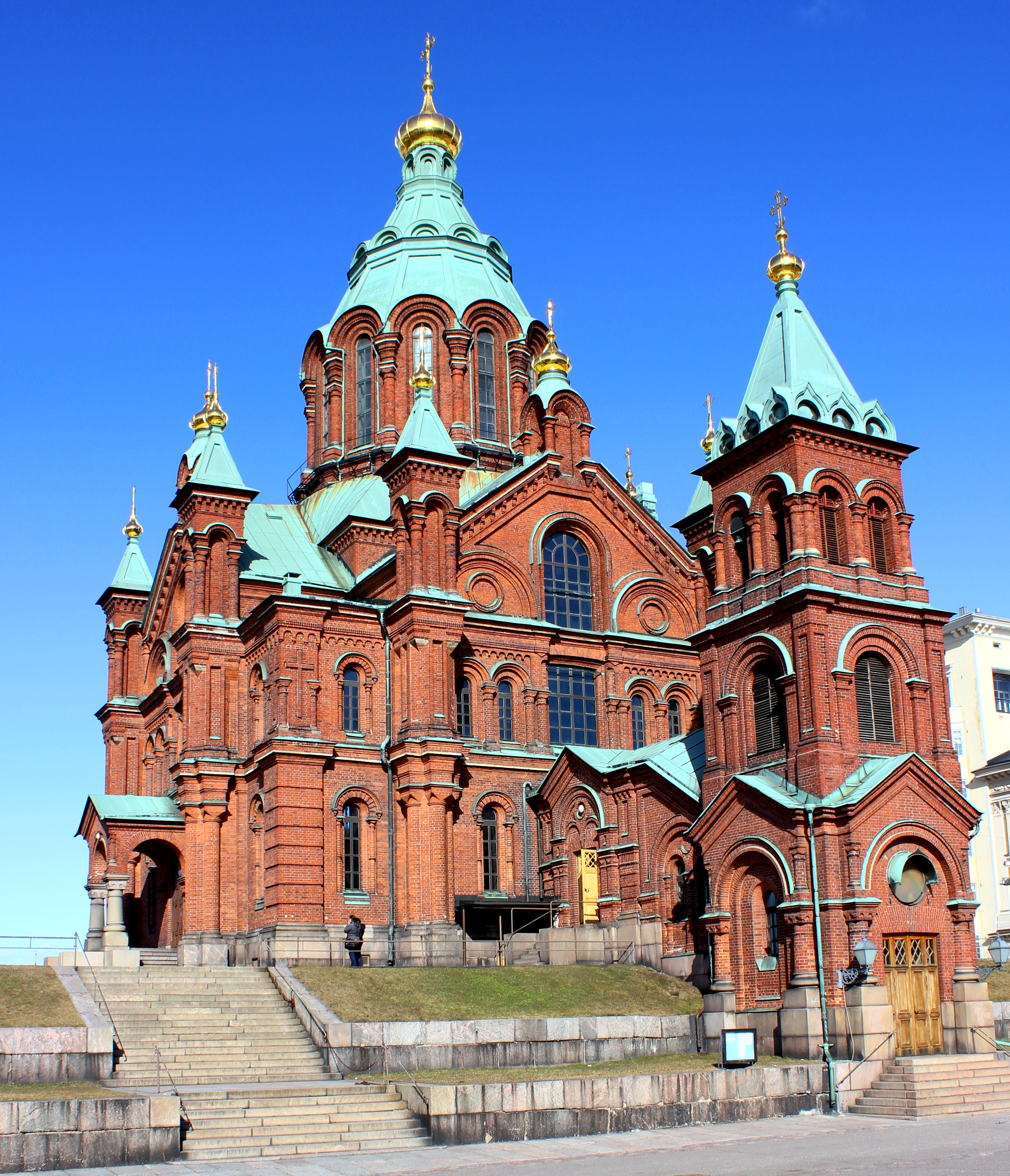
Uspenski Cathedral

Cathedrals of the Finnish Orthodox Church:

- Uspenski Cathedral in Helsinki
- St. Nicholas Cathedral in Kuopio
- Holy Trinity Cathedral, Oulu

== Catholic ==
Cathedrals of the Catholic Church in Finland:

- St. Henrik's Cathedral in Helsinki

== See also ==
- List of cathedrals
