= Kuopio City Library =

Public library in Kuopio, Finland

- Kuopion kaupunginkirjasto
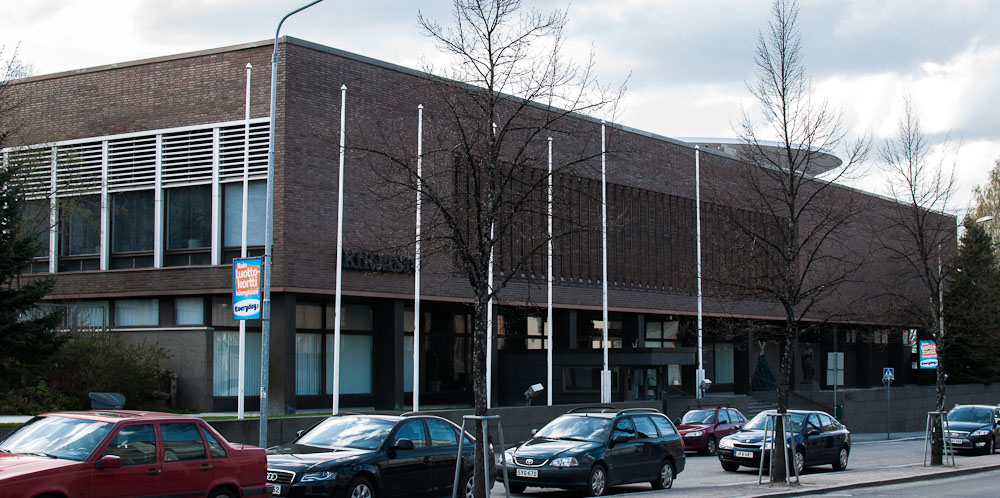
- Kuopio City Main Library building
- 62°53′34.4″N 027°41′11.8″E
- Location: Vahtivuori, Kuopio, Finland
- Type: Public library
- Established: 1872
- Branches: 13

Collection
- Size: 595,778 (2020)

Access and use
- Circulation: 1,721,390 (2020)

Other information
- Budget: €6,500,000 (2020)
- Employees: 79 (2020)
- Website: kuopio.finna.fi

Kuopio City Library (Finnish: Kuopion kaupunginkirjasto) is a municipal and regional library in Kuopio, Finland. The main library building is located in the Vahtivuori district. There are also 13 other library branches in the districts of Kuopio and three bookmobiles.

The current building of the main library in Kuopio was designed by architect Matti Hakala and was completed in 1967. Prior to that, the library was located in the same premises as the Kuopio Museum. In the spring of 2021, the new Hila building between the Kuopio Museum and the library building, designed by architects Aki Davidsson and Jaana Tarkela, was completed. This contributes to the reunification of the main library and the museum, and has been named the Kantti Quarter (Kantti-kortteli), which cherishes cultural heritage.

== See also ==
- List of libraries in Finland
