= Holy Trinity Cathedral, Oulu =

- Finnish: Oulun Pyhän Kolminaisuuden katedraali Swedish: Heliga Treenighetens katedral
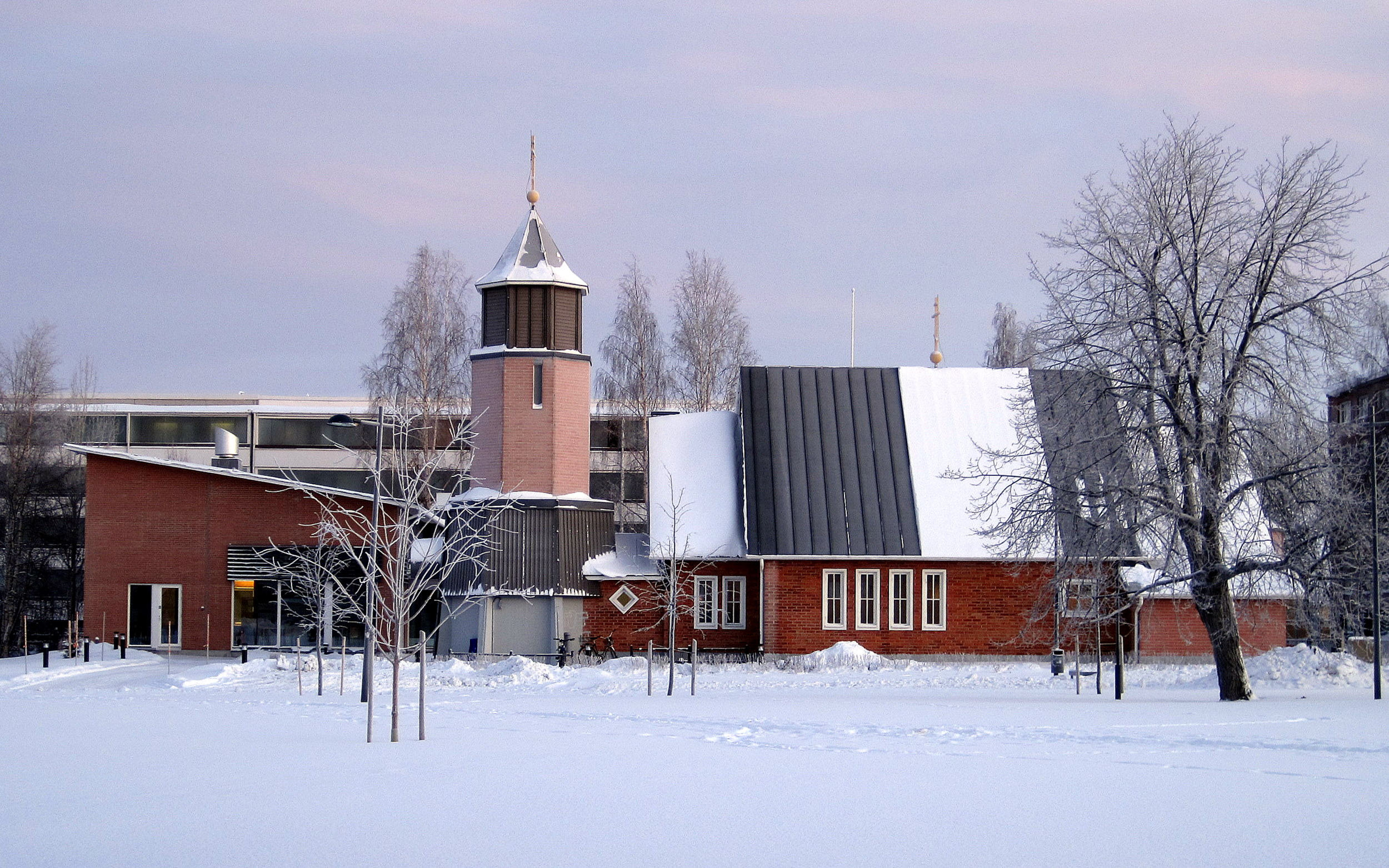
- Holy Trinity Cathedral, Oulu
- 65°00′22″N 025°27′31″E
- Location: Oulu
- Country: Finland
- Denomination: Eastern Orthodox
- Website: www.oulunortodoksinenseurakunta.fi

History
- Former name: Holy Trinity Church
- Consecrated: 1958

Architecture
- Functional status: Active
- Architect: Mikko Huhtela
- Architectural type: Cathedral
- Completed: 1957

Administration
- Diocese: Oulu

Clergy
- Bishop: Elia, Metropolitan of Oulu

Holy Trinity Cathedral, Oulu (Finnish: Pyhän Kolminaisuuden katedraali, Swedish: Heliga Treenighetens katedral), is an Eastern Orthodox cathedral in Oulu, Finland. The church is located in the Hollihaka district about one kilometre south of the city centre.

The church building was designed by architect Mikko Huhtela and was completed in 1957. The church was consecrated in October 1958 and dedicated to the Holy Trinity. In 1980, the Oulu Diocese of the Orthodox Church of Finland was created and the church was consecrated as a cathedral.

== See also ==
- List of cathedrals in Finland
  - Saint Nicholas Cathedral, Kuopio
  - Uspenski Cathedral
