= The Garden of Death =

Painting by Hugo Simberg

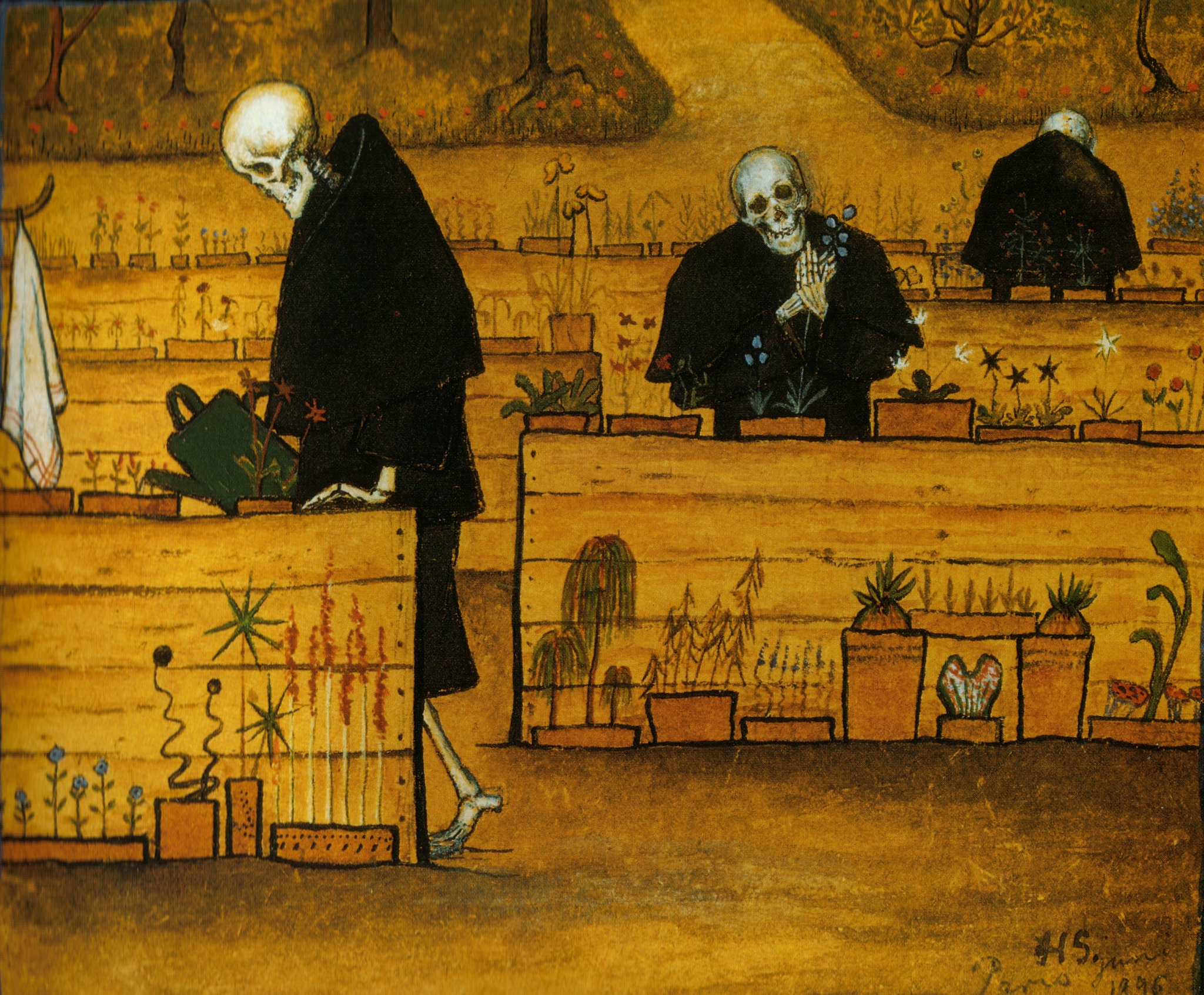
- Artist: Hugo Simberg
- Year: 1896
- Type: Watercolor and gouache
- Dimensions: 16 cm × 17 cm (6.3 in × 6.7 in)
- Location: Ateneum, Helsinki

The Garden of Death (Finnish: Kuoleman puutarha; 1896) is a painting by Finnish symbolist painter Hugo Simberg. Like many of Simberg's paintings, it depicts a gloomy, otherworldly scene. The central figures are reminiscent of the classic black-clad Grim Reaper, but paradoxically are tending to gardens; traditionally symbols of birth or renewal.

== Background ==
In his childhood, Simberg was heavily involved in rural life. This exposure to rural life early, allowed him to be able to create art based on the simplest themes of life such as life and death. In The Garden of Death particularly, Simberg chose to avoid the normal conventions of symbolism in an effort to display his rendition of "child-like naivety". In Finland, it was not unusual to address the theme of death. For Simberg, in particular, due to his rural life upbringing, he would typically explore the destructive forces of nature in his works. In these works, he would commonly personify nature while also objectifying humanity.

Simberg began his artistic journey at the Finnish Fine Arts Association in Helsinki. During his time as a student, he was taught under the instruction of symbolist artist Akseli Gallen-Kallela. After nearly two years of instruction from Gallen-Kallela, Simberg's artwork began to be heavily influenced by Gallen-Kallela's fusion of both symbolism and the National Romantic style. In Simberg's earliest paintings such as Frost and Autumn, the usage of watercolors is applied to demonstrate Simberg's flair of symbolism showing “off fairy-like motifs”. During Simberg's entire career he took many trips away from his homeland, Finland. In the earliest parts of his career, Simberg would avoid the decadent areas of well-known cities listening to the instruction from Gallen-Kallela. While he typically stayed in the rural lands, he also traveled within some cities. Throughout his time in these different cities, he would find influences from the different art styles offered such as photography, theater, and sculptures.

== Interpretation ==
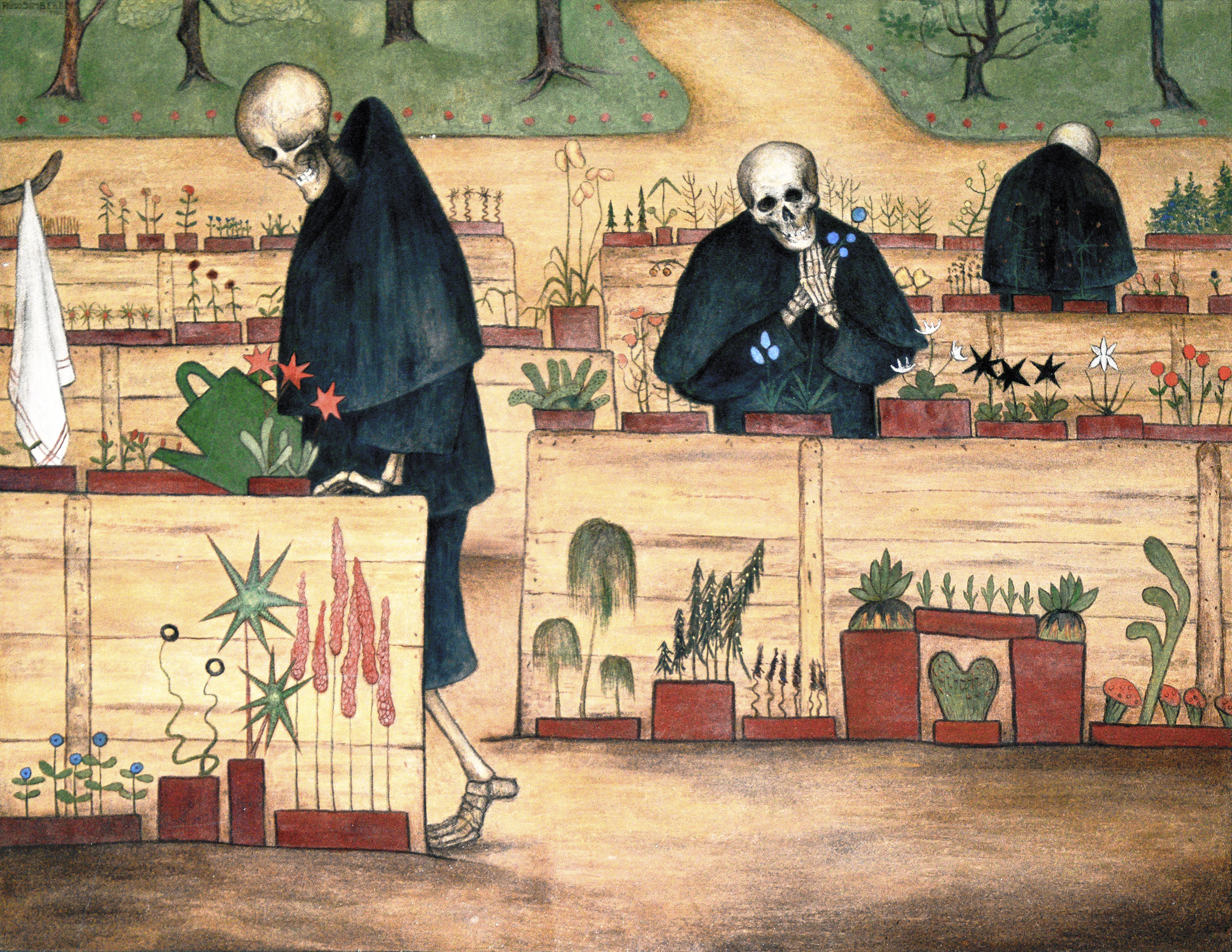
The Garden of Death as a fresco, Tampere Cathedral

For years, interpretations of Simberg's artwork have been a place of mystery for historians and psychologists alike. However, The Garden of Death is one of the few paintings whose symbolism Simberg explained; typically he preferred to let viewers come to their own conclusions. In a note on one sketch he described the garden as "the place where the dead end up before going to Heaven". Because of this explanation, there is a connection from this piece of artwork to spiritualism. Furthering this interpretation, the work is described as having the skeletons symbolize being a friend and performing typical home rituals. Simberg's juxtaposition of the traditionally frightening imagery of death with the tenderness and humor of his portrayal invite the viewer to consider mortality in a new light.

The image of death as the gardener is considered a significant reference to Simberg's typology. The garden used in the work can be seen as philosophical gardens, possibly even pointing to an overall symbol of a new type of religious garden. Following the idea of religious gardens, the gardens created by Simberg follow the Gardens of Eden, the Garden of Christ, and the Garden of Virtues. Because Simberg decided to mix both positive and negative characters in the artwork, many leaders within the Evangelical Lutheran Church of Finland were left questioning the indirect notion of biblical characters. Many of the Church's authorities felt irritated and ultimately opposed the artwork.

The painting was a favored subject of Simberg's and he made several versions using different techniques, including larger fresco version of the painting in the Tampere Cathedral, which also contains other works by Simberg. Since Simberg gave observers a slight explanation the artwork, many still try to interpret the symbols used in the piece today.

== See also ==
- The Story of a Mother, Danish writer Hans Christian Andersen's 1847 fairy tale which depicts Death as having a greenhouse containing plants that represent human lifespans.
