= Hugo Simberg =

Finnish painter (1873–1917)

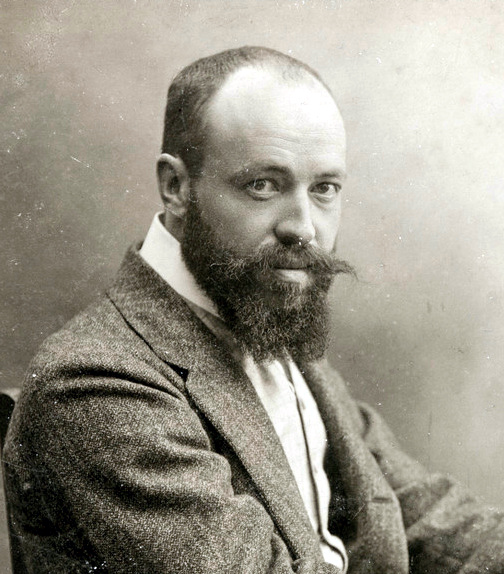
- Born: Hugo Gerhard Simberg; 24 June 1873; Hamina, Grand Duchy of Finland, Russian Empire
- Died: 12 July 1917 (aged 44); Ähtäri, Grand Duchy of Finland, Russian Empire
- Known for: Painter
- Notable work: The Garden of Death (1896); The Wounded Angel (1903)
- Movement: Symbolism

Hugo Gerhard Simberg (24 June 1873 – 12 July 1917) was a Finnish symbolist painter and graphic artist.

== Life and career ==
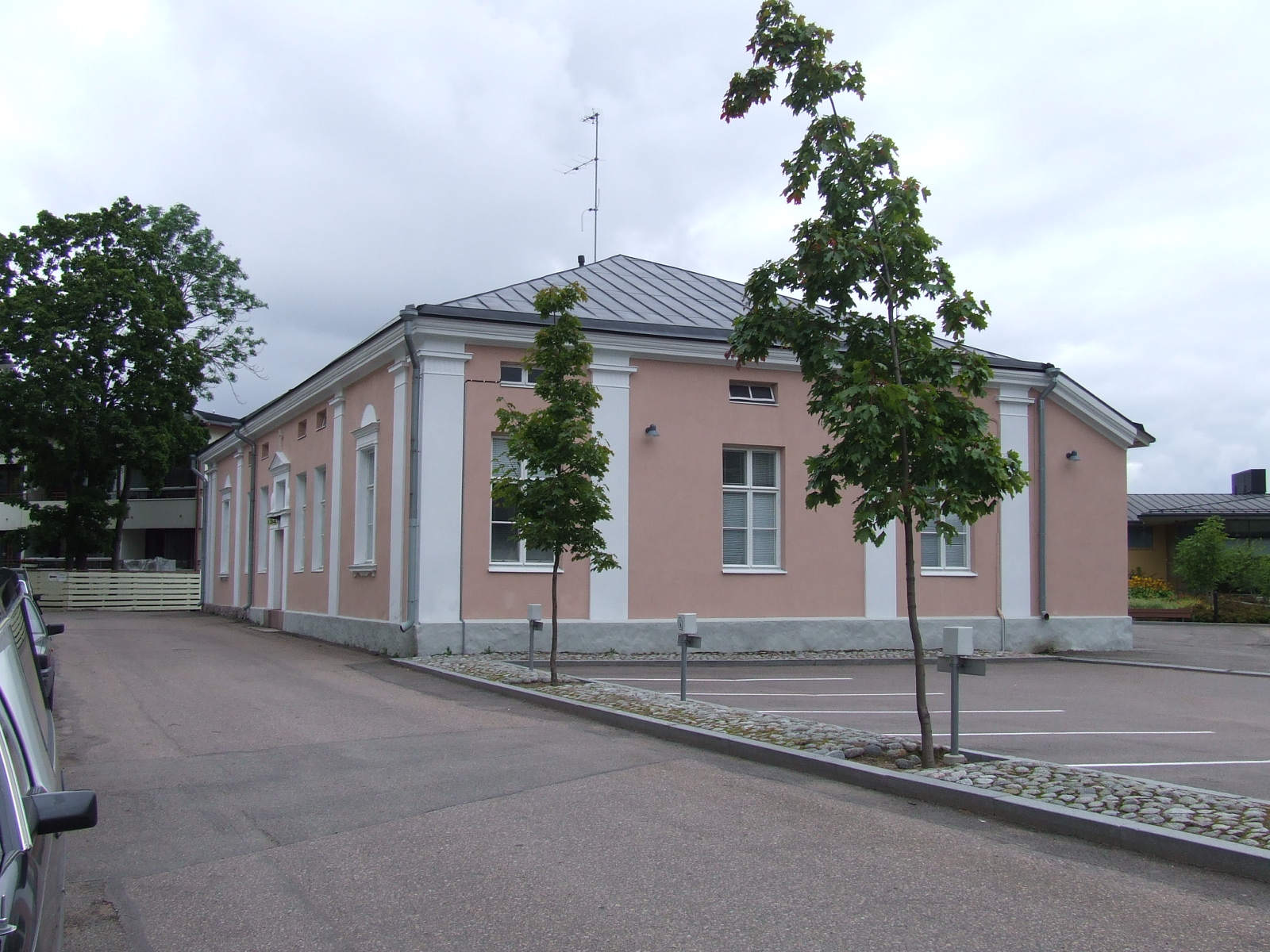
The birthplace of Hugo Simberg in the town of Hamina

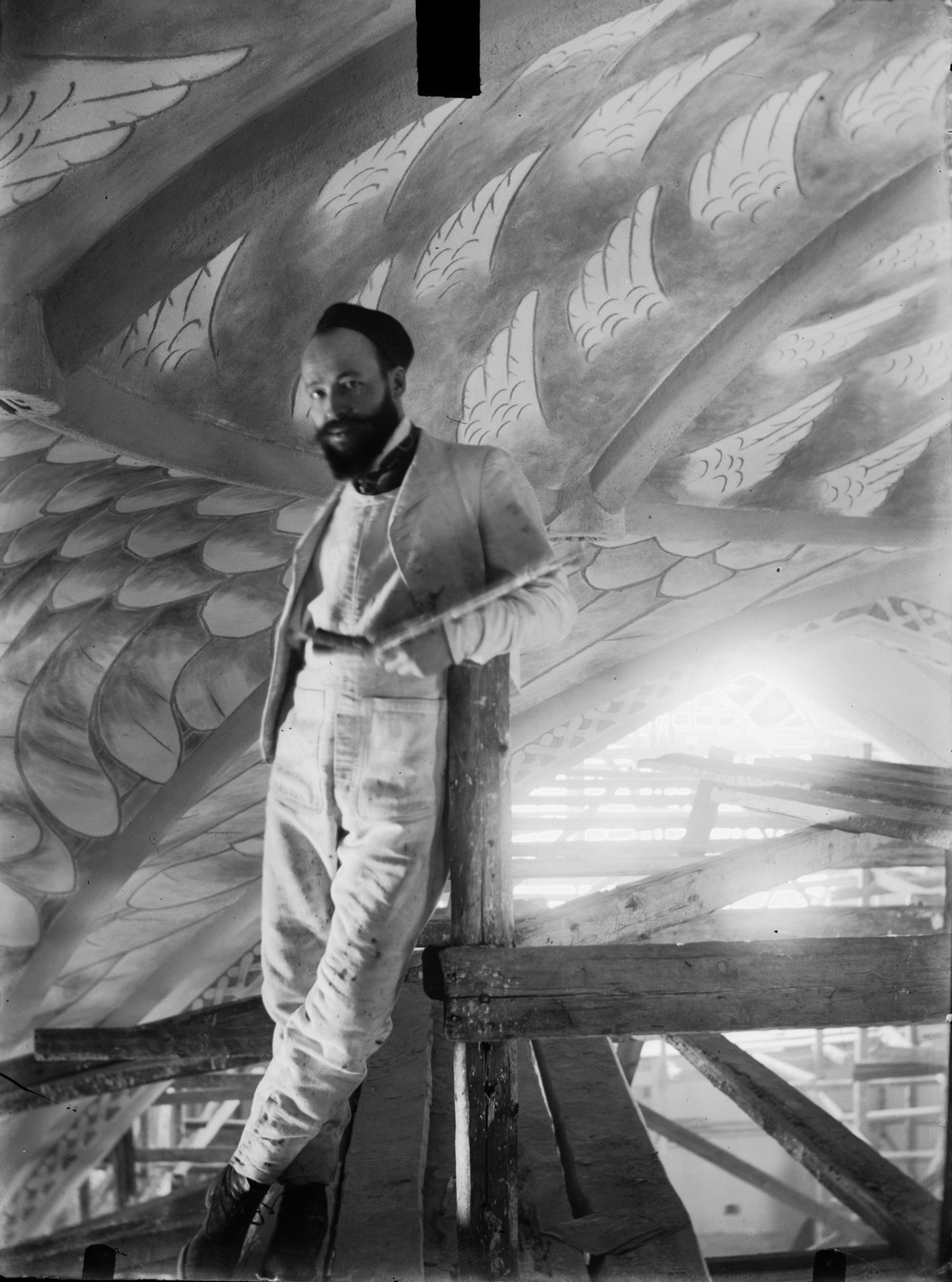
Working on the Tampere Cathedral frescoes, 1904

Simberg was born on 24 June 1873, at Hamina (Swedish: Fredrikshamn), Finland, the son of Colonel Nicolai Simberg and Ebba Matilda Simberg (née Widenius). Simberg learned to read thanks to his aunt Alexandra, who ran a private school in the family home. His aunt was an amateur painter and likely influenced Simberg's decision to become a painter.

In 1891, at the age of 18, he enrolled at the Drawing School of the Viipuri Friends of Art, and he also studied at the Drawing School of the Finnish Art Society from 1893 to 1895. His teachers there were, among others, Helene Schjerfbeck and Elin Danielson-Gambogi. Then, in 1895, after his aunt had sent him a newspaper clipping about symbolism with the hope that it would help him find the courage to embark on a new path, he decided to become the private pupil of Akseli Gallen-Kallela at his wilderness studio Kalela in Ruovesi. He studied under Gallen-Kallela for three periods between 1895 and 1897.

In 1896, Simberg went to London, and in 1897 to Paris and Italy. During these years he exhibited several works at the Finnish Artists' autumn exhibitions, including Autumn, Frost, The Devil Playing and Aunt Alexandra (1898), which were well received. Critical success led to his being made a member of the Finnish Art Association and to his being appointed to teach at the Drawing School of the Viipuri Friends of Art.

In 1904, he was commissioned to decorate the interior of St John's church in Tampere (now Tampere Cathedral), a project which he carried out with Magnus Enckell between 1904 and 1906. There was controversy around Simberg's work, as the serpent and the nakedness of the garland-bearing boys, central parts of the paintings, caused indignation. The supervising committee approved the work by only one vote.

At the turn of the year 1907–08 he made a short visit to the United States. He also designed the UPM-Kymmene logo, the Griffon (1899).

From around 1907 to 1913, he taught at the Drawing School of the Finnish Art Association at Ateneum. In 1910, he married Anni Bremer. They had two children, Tom and Uhra-Beata, the latter of whom became a ryijy artist.

He died in Ähtäri on 12 July 1917. His biographer, Helena Ruuska, suspects that he battled an unknown disease, possibly syphilis, for a long time.

== Style ==
Simberg's paintings emphasize mainly macabre and supernatural topics. In the autumn of 1902, Silmberg fell ill with meningitis and was forced to stay in bed for much of the winter. After recovering, he painted his most famous painting: The Wounded Angel. Its titular character appears in the shape of a winged angel with a bandaged head, borne on a stretcher by two somberly dressed boys, one of whom looks toward the viewer with a serious expression. The painting is the best known of the artist's works and is especially famous in Finland. The Finnish symphonic metal band Nightwish released in 2007 a music video influenced by this painting, "Amaranth".

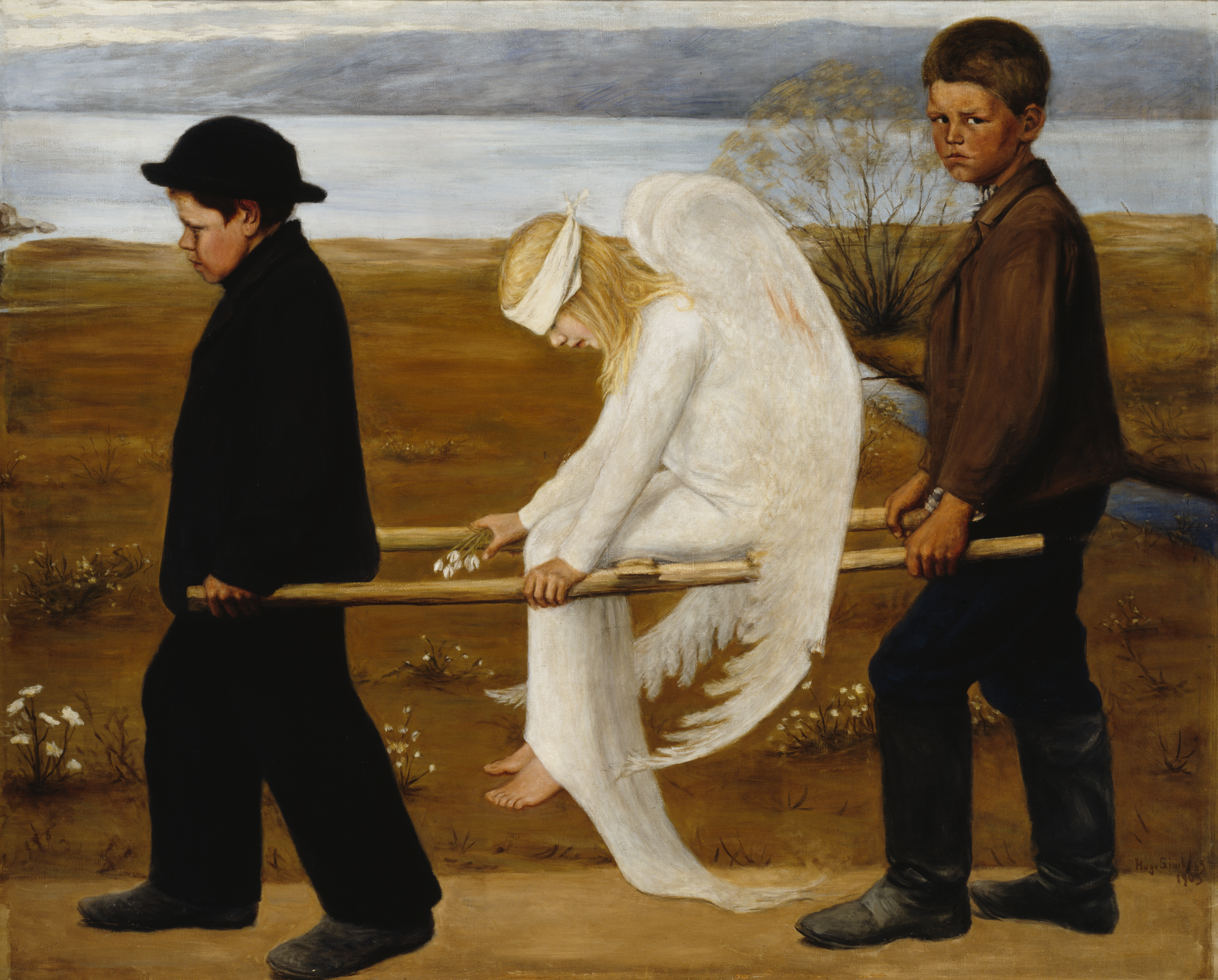
The Wounded Angel, 1903, voted Finland's "national painting" in a public vote organized by Ateneum in 2006

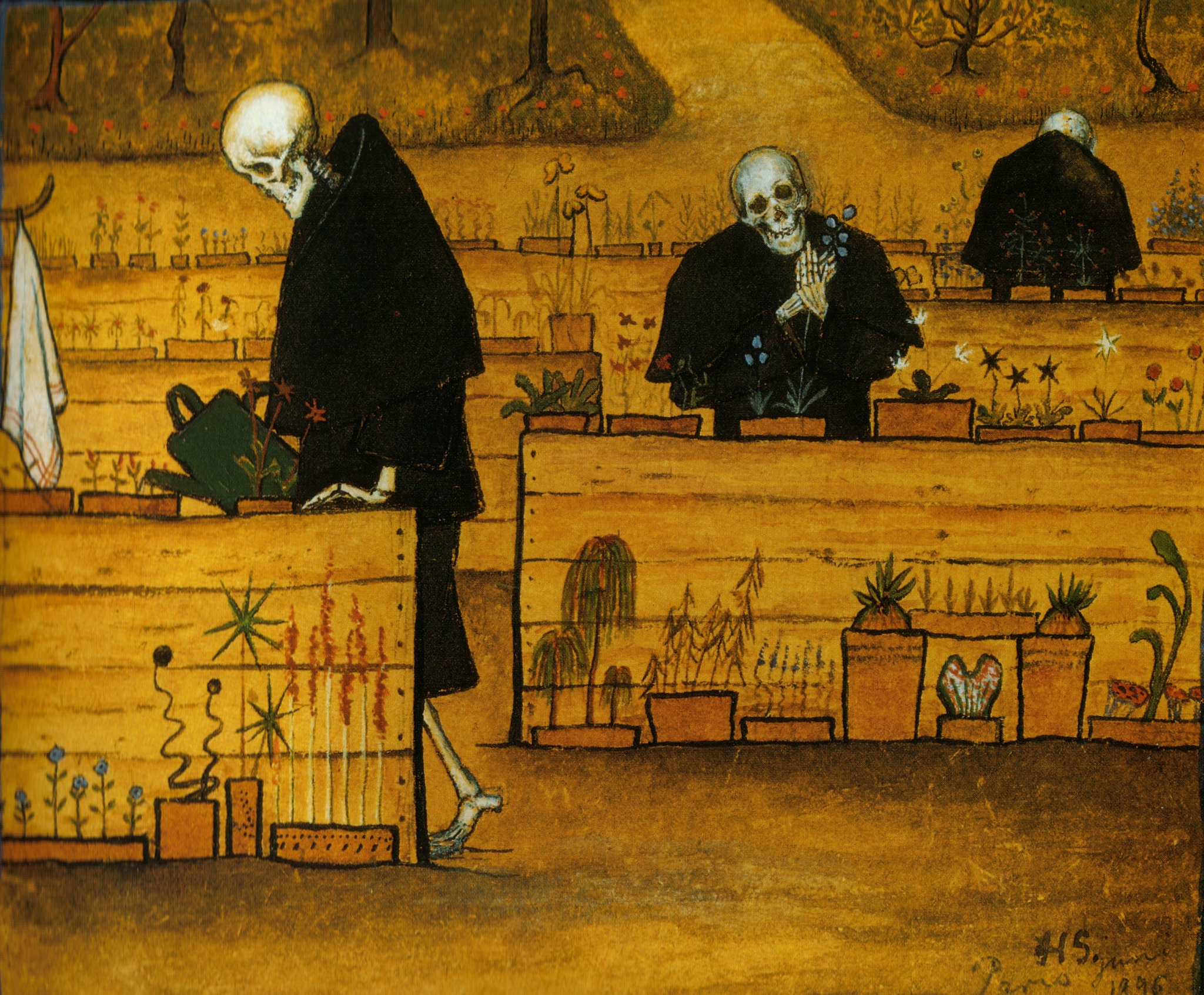
The Garden of Death, 1896

Another famous painting is The Garden of Death, which, like many of Simberg's paintings, depicts a gloomy, otherworldly scene. The central figures are reminiscent of the classic black-clad Grim Reaper, but paradoxically are tending to gardens, traditionally symbols of birth or renewal.

== Gallery ==
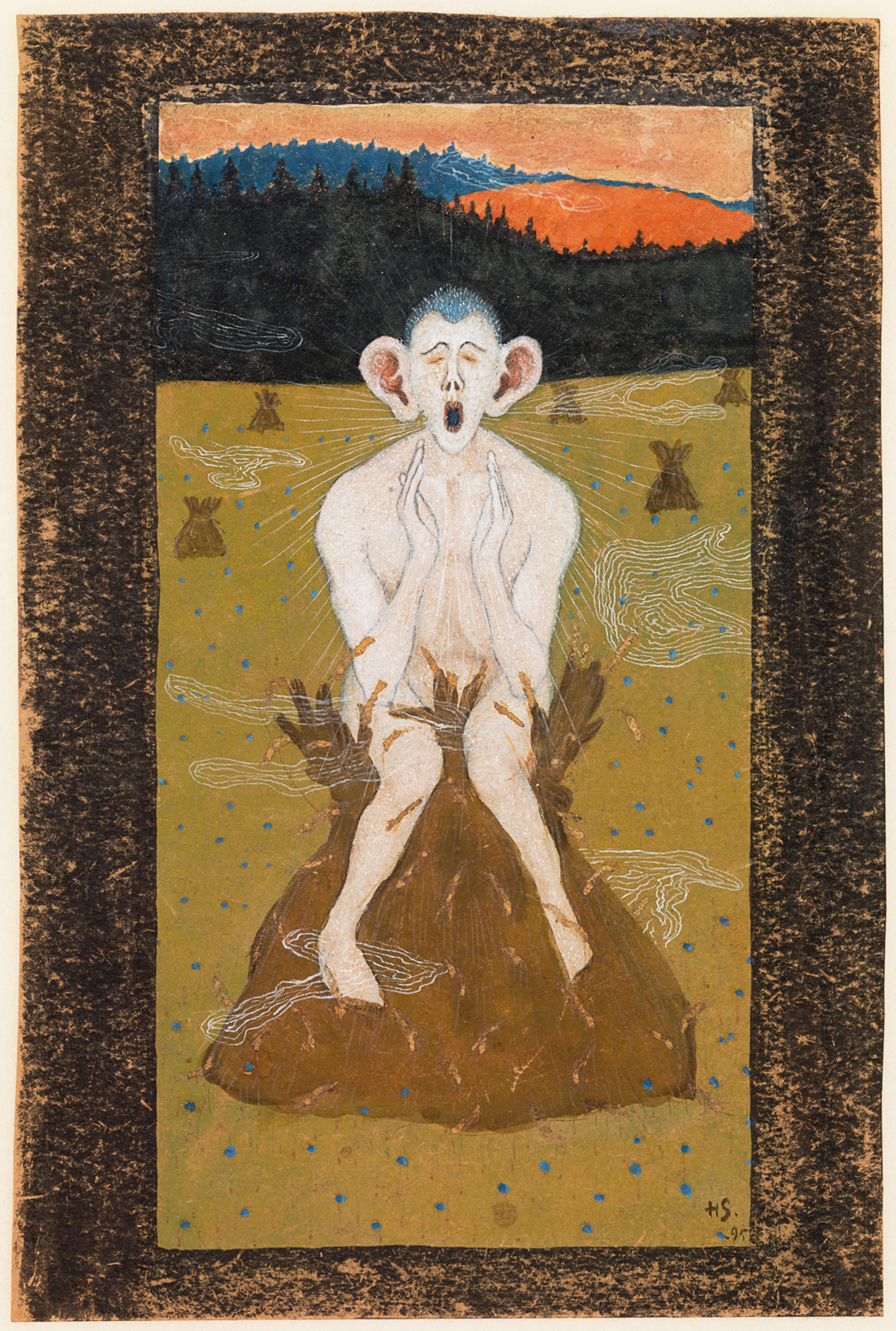
Frost (fi), 1895, gouache

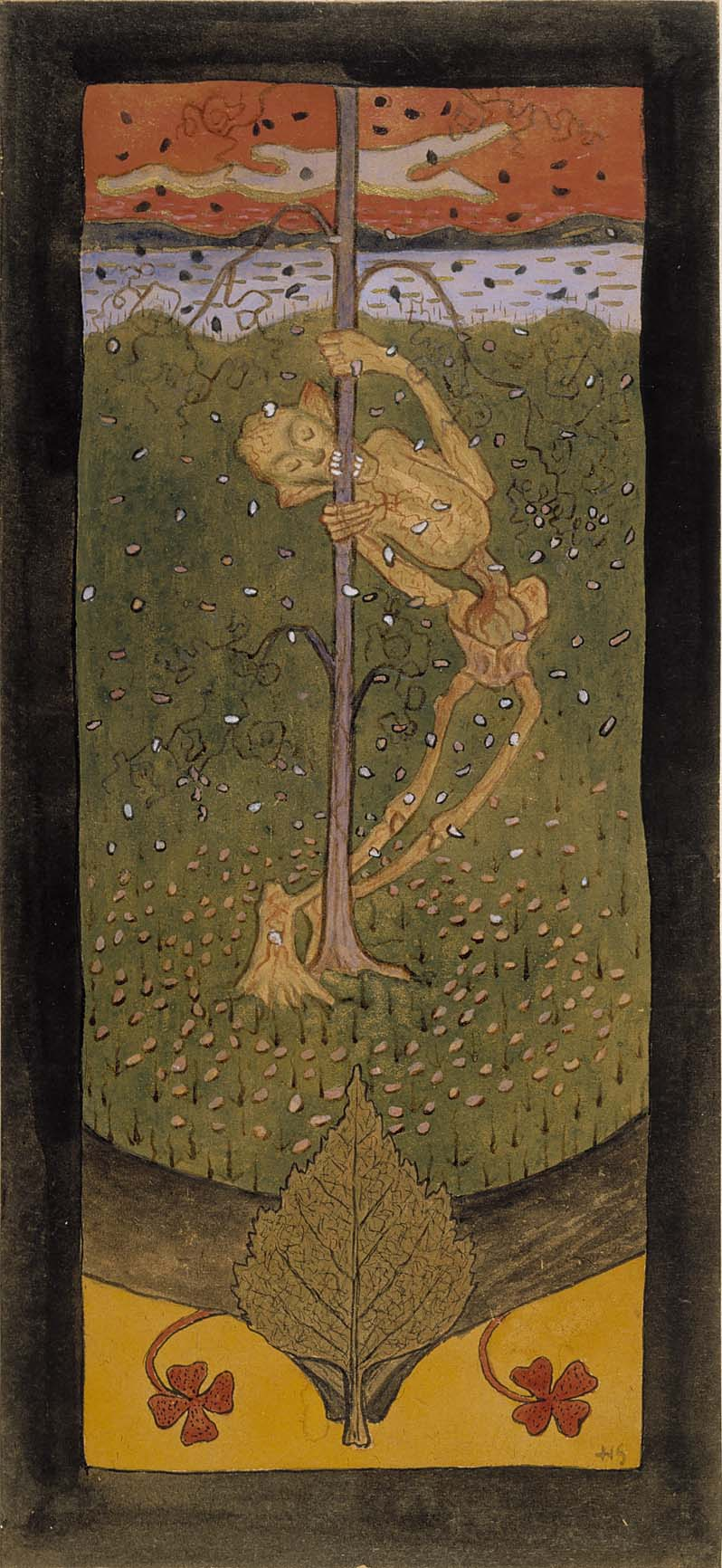
Autumn I, 1895

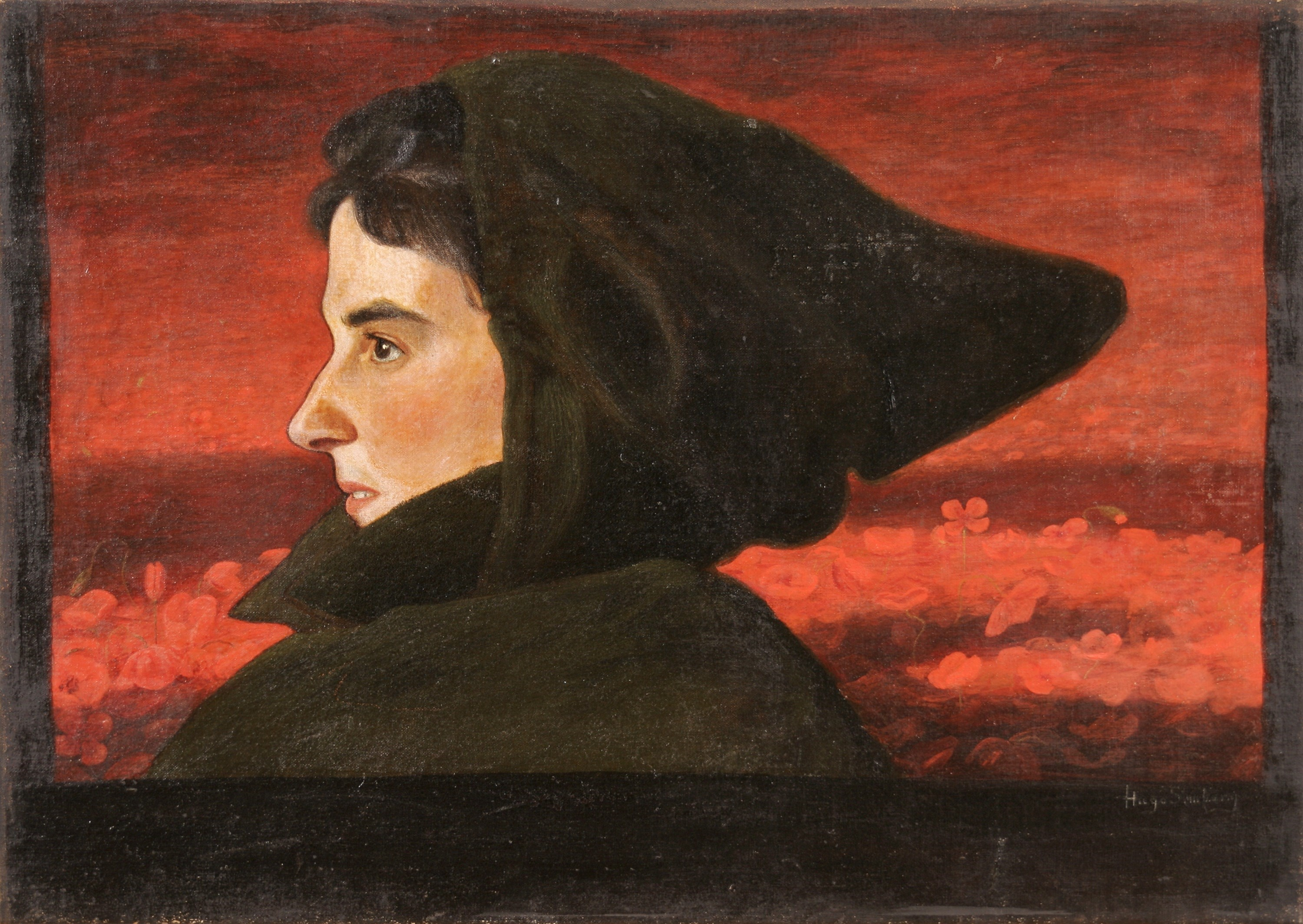
Poppy, 1896

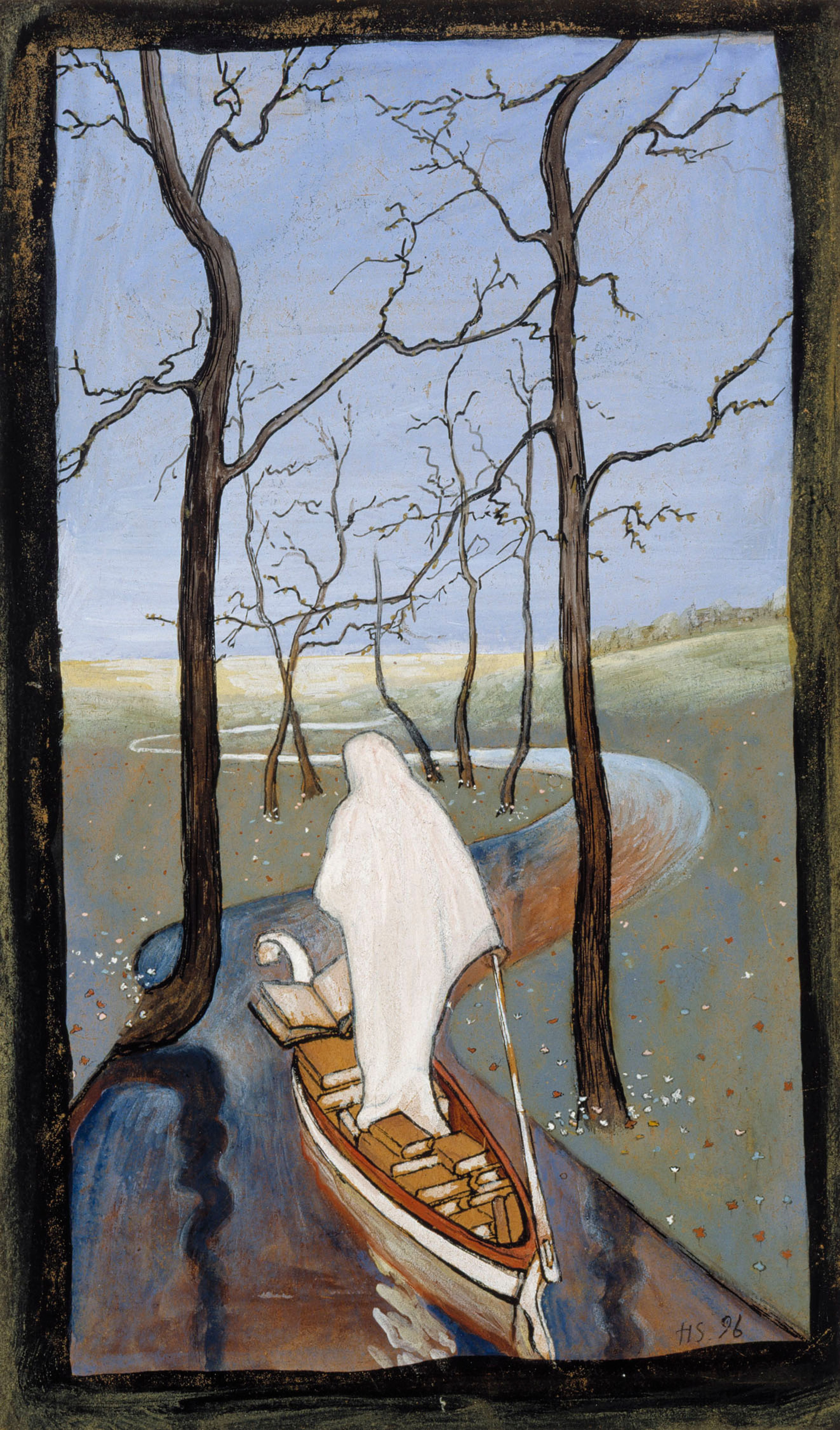
On the Stream of Life, 1896

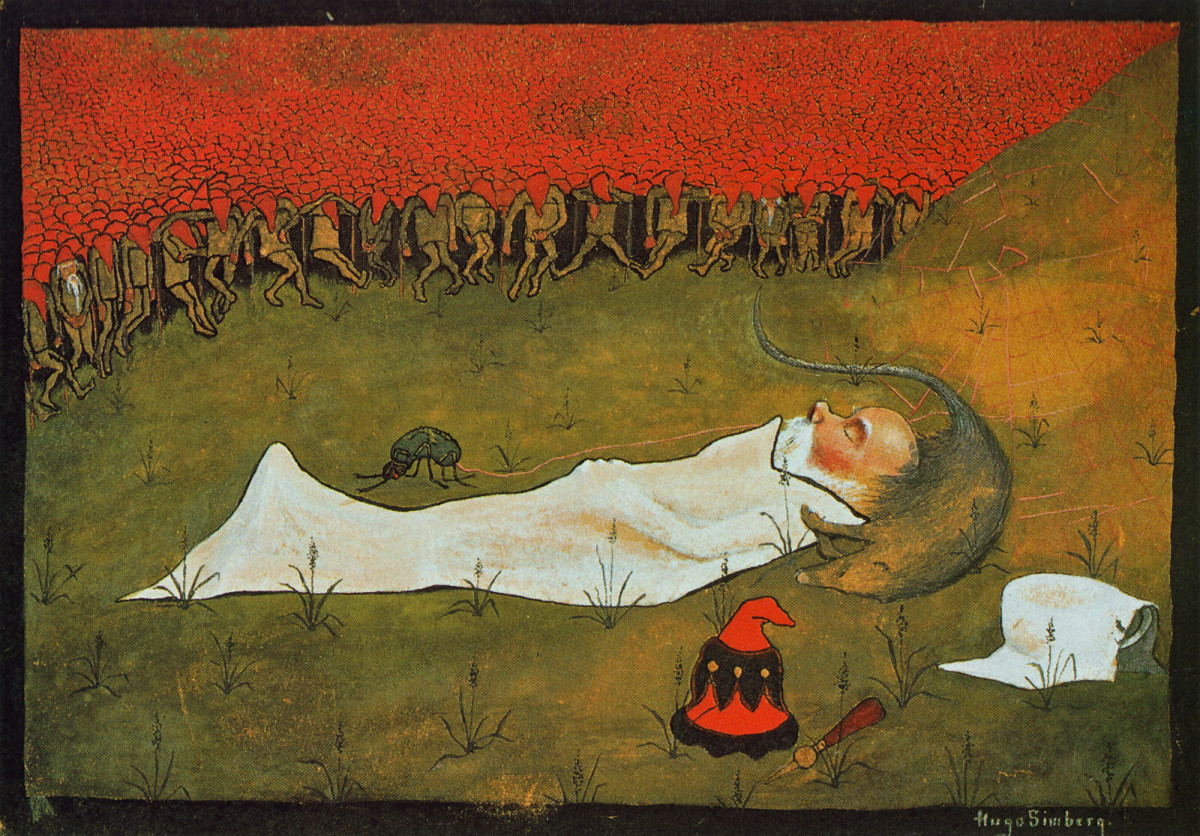
King Hobgoblin Sleeping, 1896

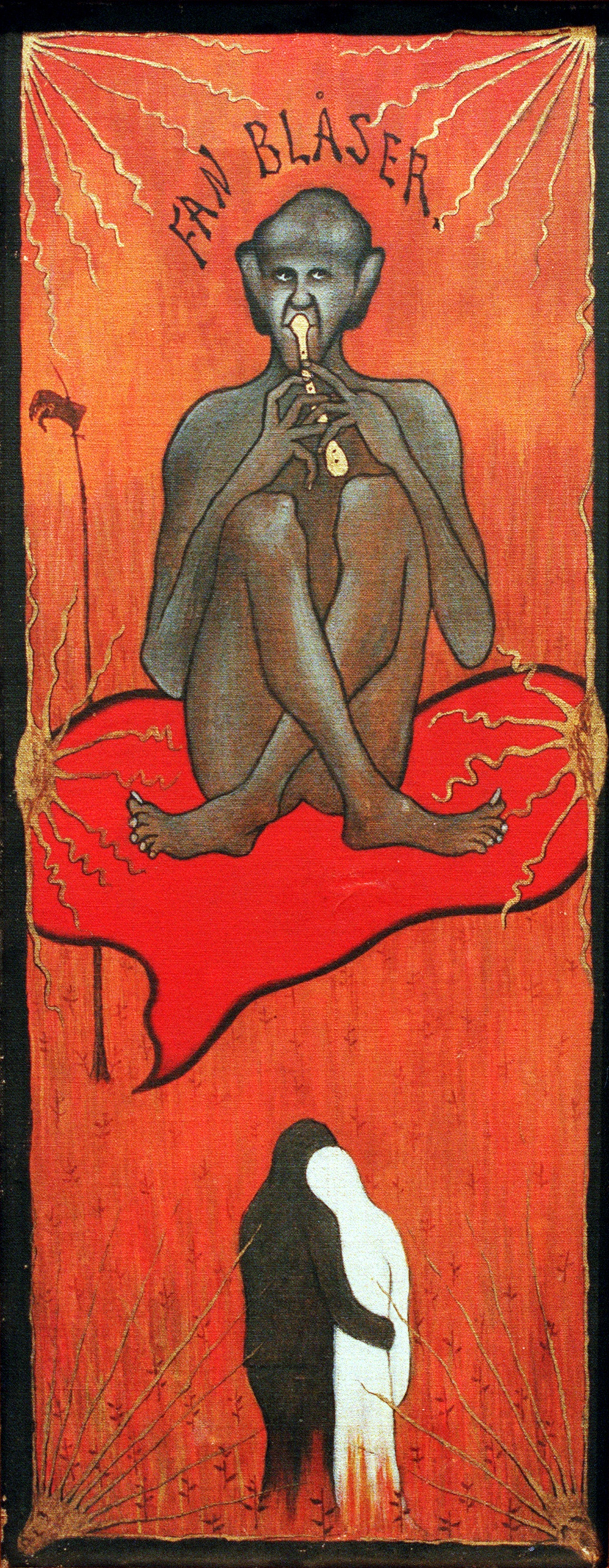
The Devil Playing, 1896 (Note: Simberg describes how in London at dusk he saw youths gathering at a park, forming a circle, with a man and a woman entering the center and beginning to passionately kiss. He described the feeling as if he had heard the devil playing somewhere nearby.)

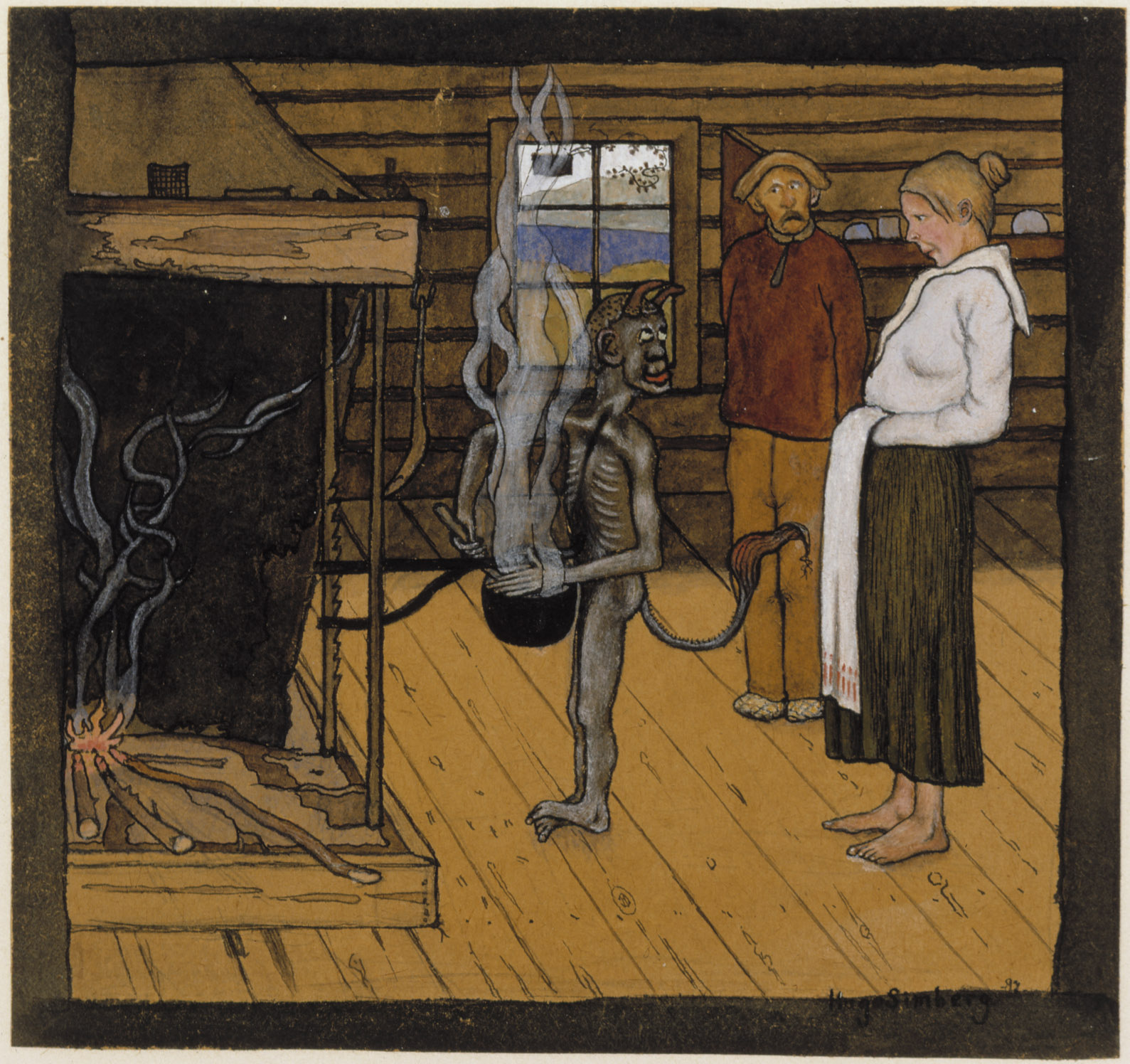
The Devil by the Pot (fi), 1897

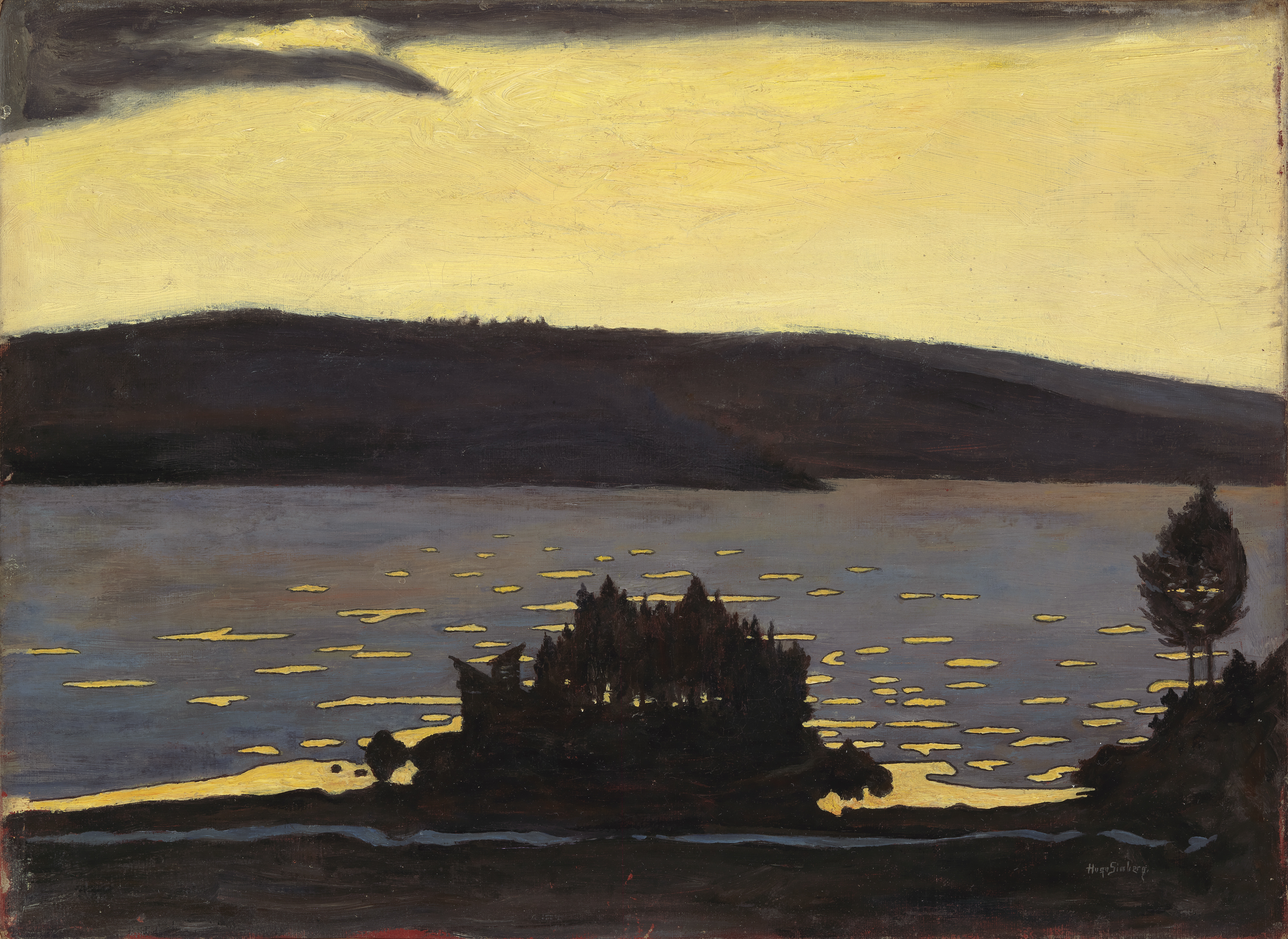
Spring Evening During the Break-Up of the Ice, 1897 (fi)

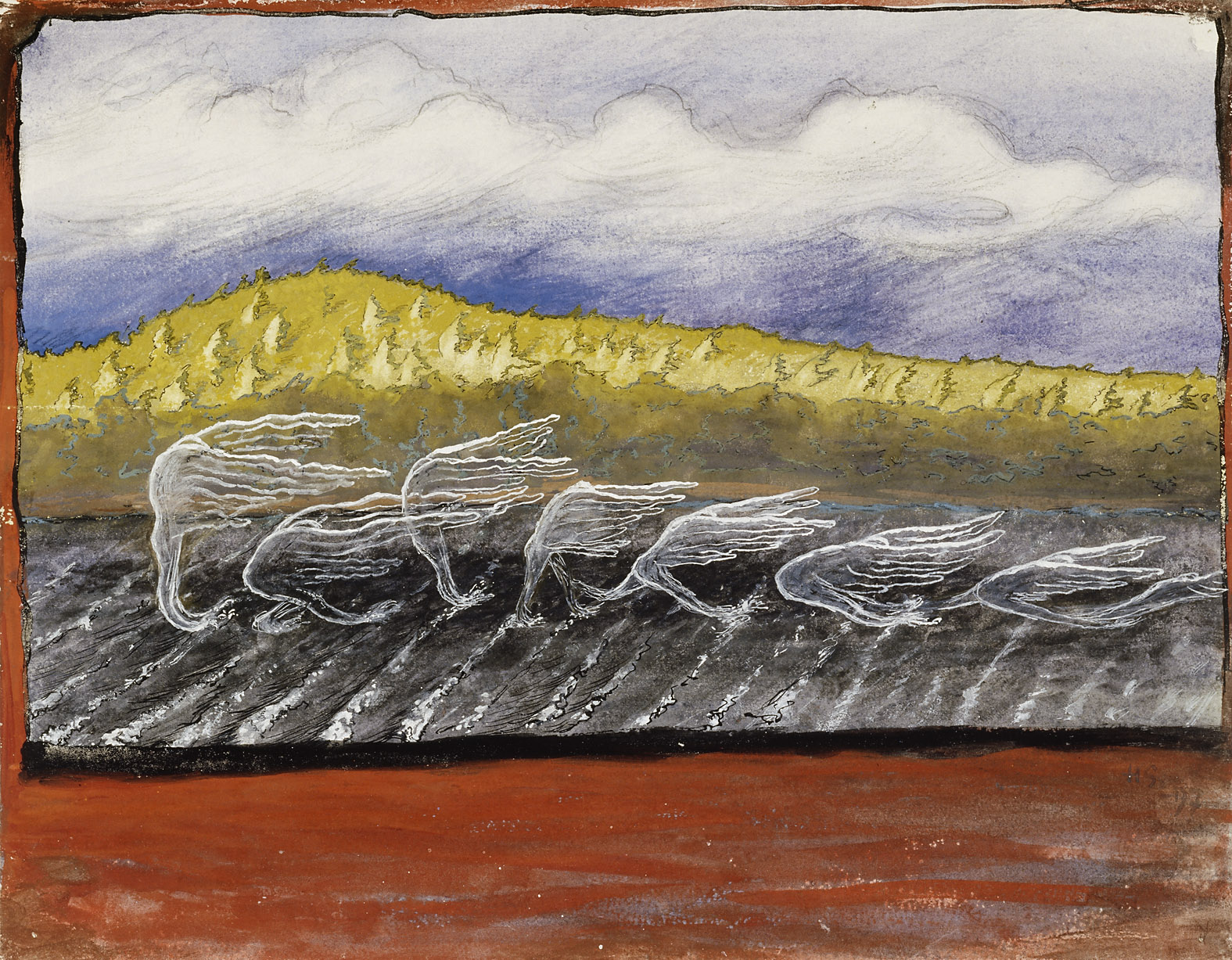
The Wind Blows, 1897

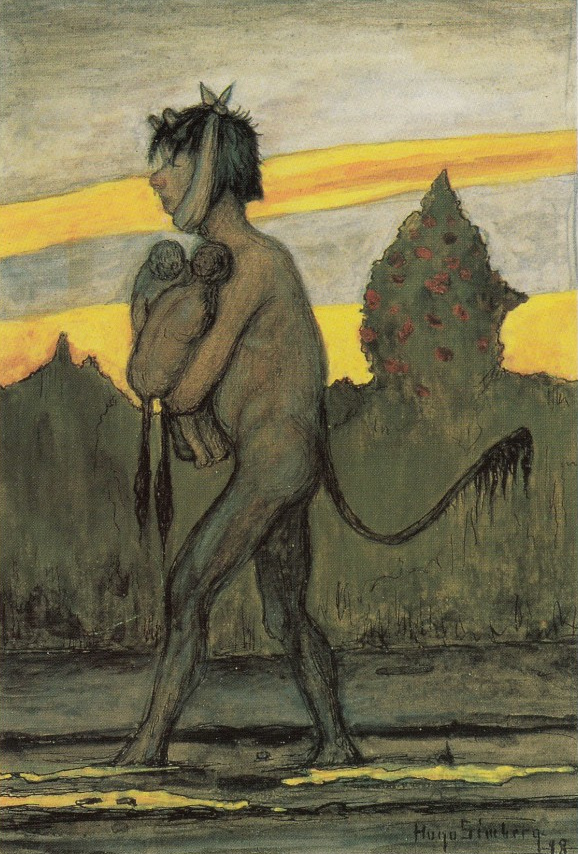
The Poor Devil with its Twins, 1898, watercolor and oil

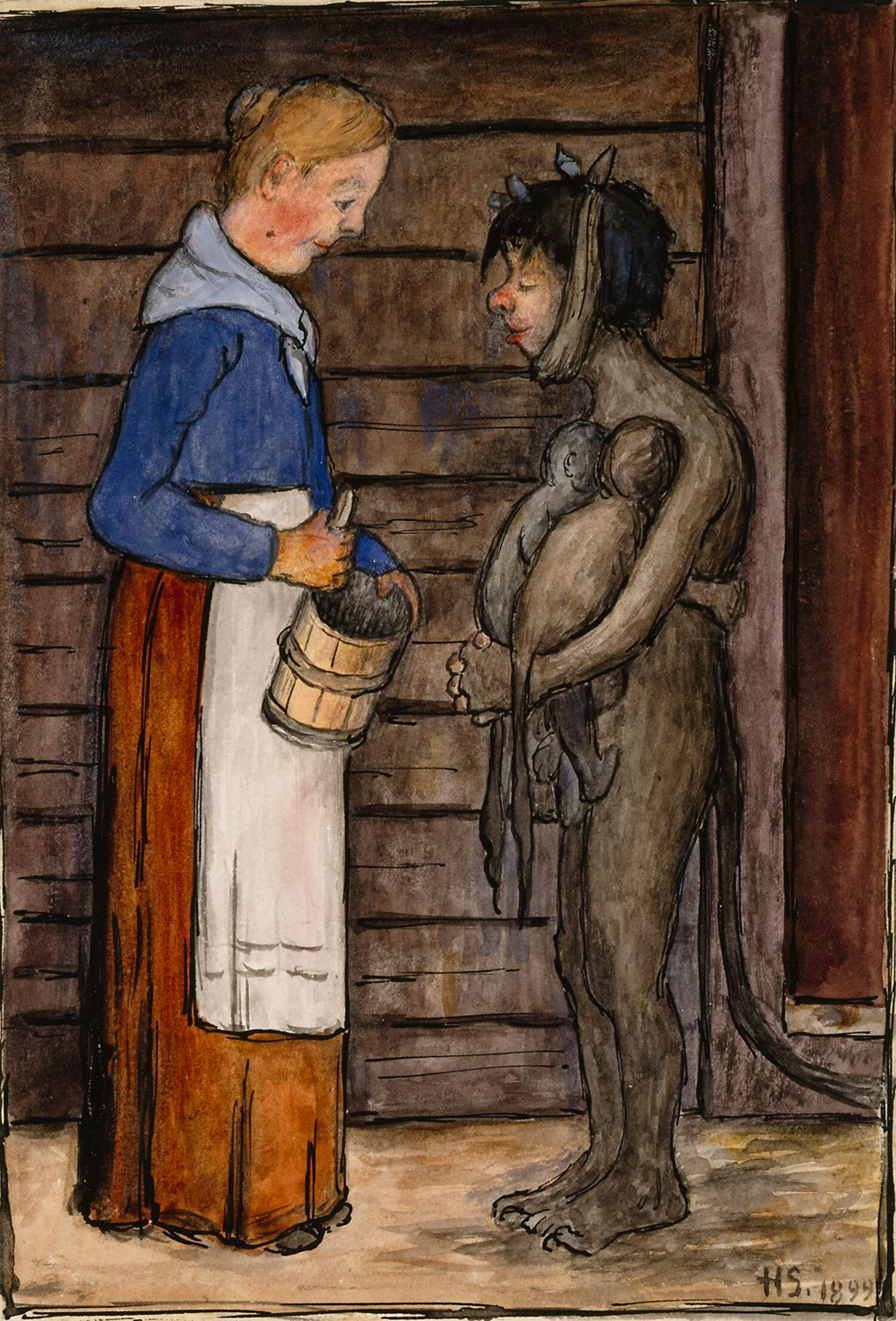
The Farmer's Wife and the Poor Devil with its Twins, 1899

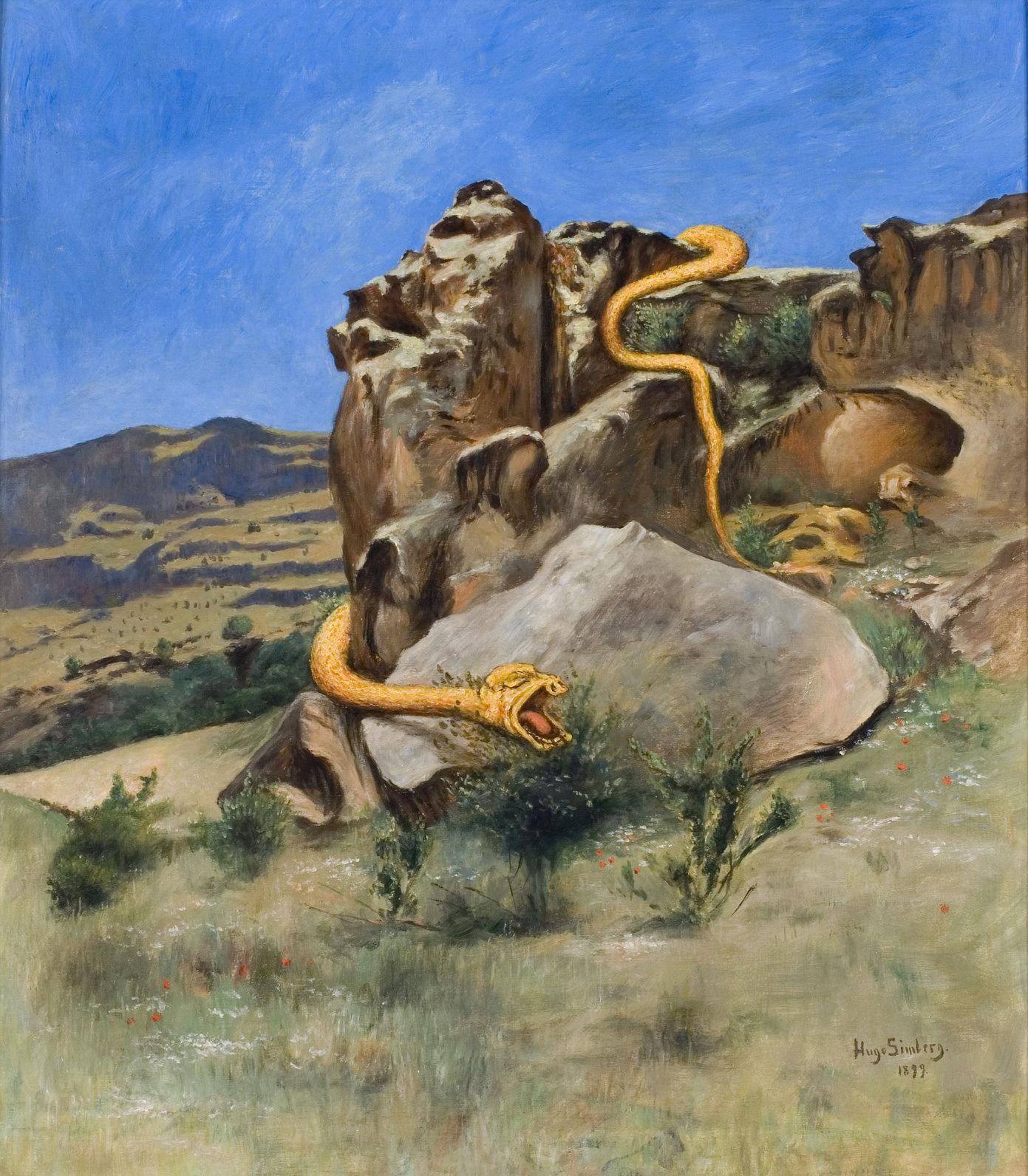
Yawning Snake, 1899, painted on his travels in the Caucasus

Sheep Girl, 1913

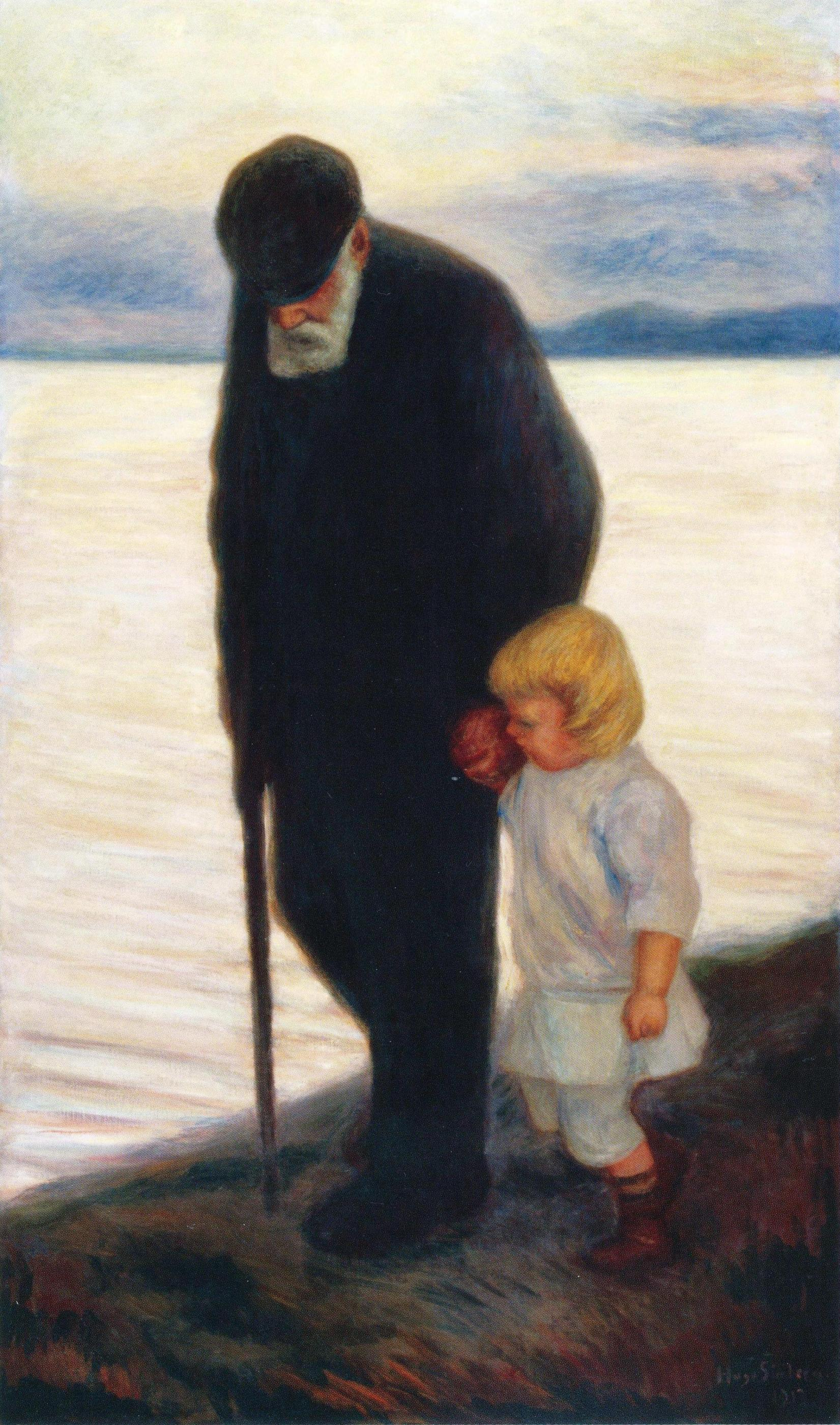
Towards the evening, 1913

== See also ==
- Golden Age of Finnish Art
- Art in Finland
