= Kuopio Museum =

Cultural and Natural history museum in Kuopio, Finland

Coordinates: 62°53′32″N 027°41′13″E

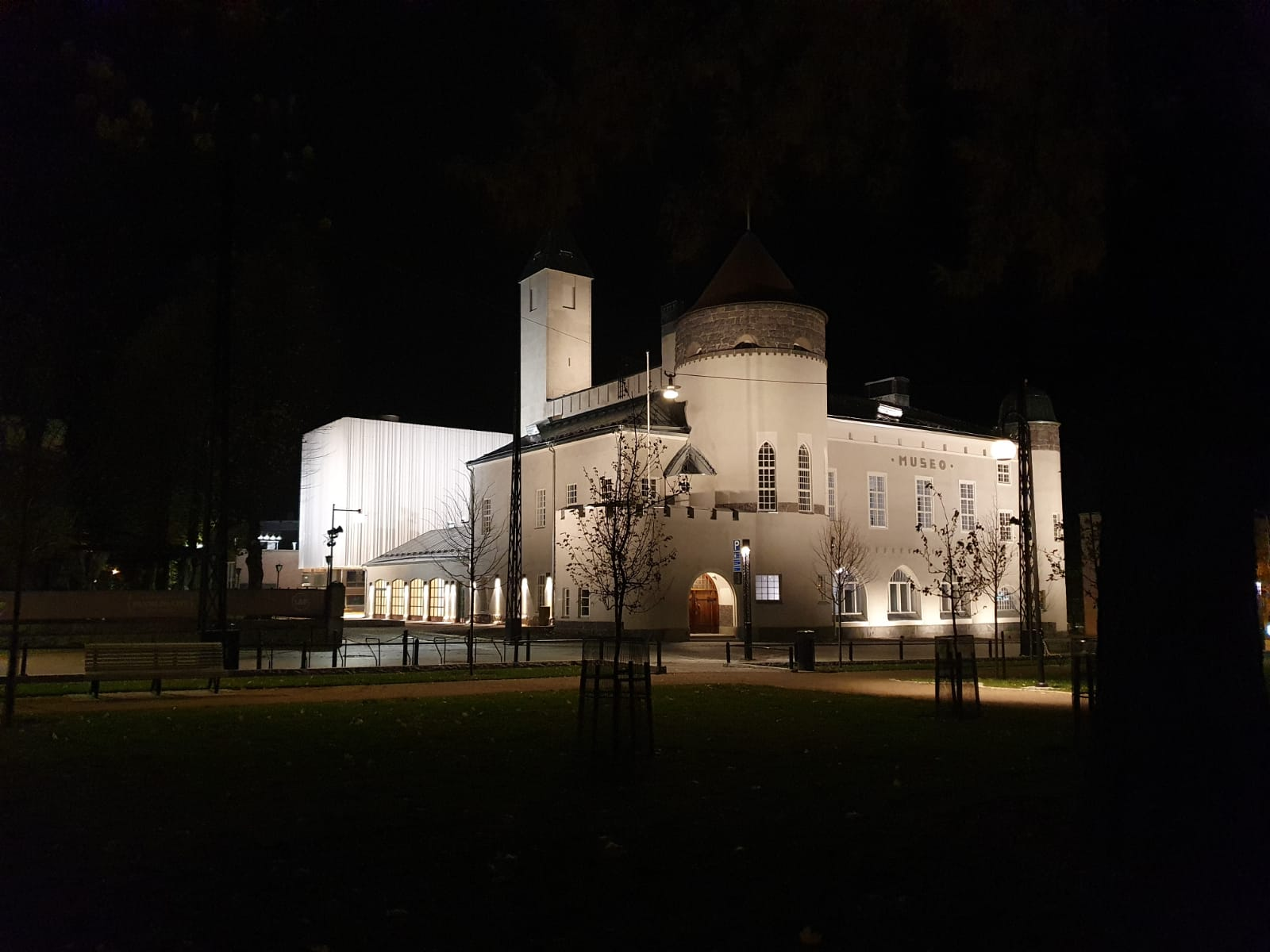
The Kuopio Museum at night in 2020

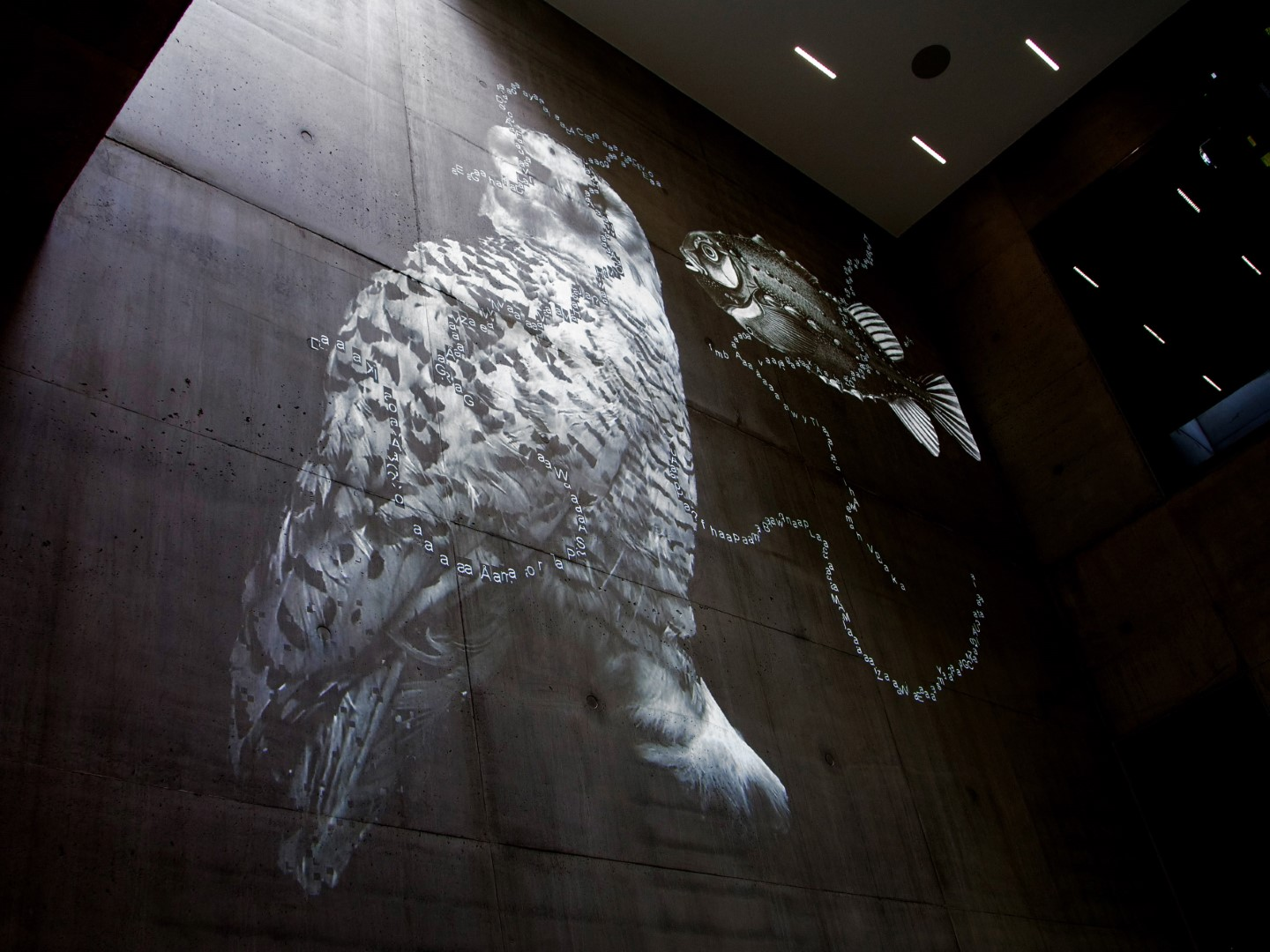
'Between Heaven and Earth', an artwork by Charles Sandison installed in the new extension of Kuopio Museum

The Kuopio Museum is an Art Nouveau-style museum building completed in 1907 on the edge of Snellman Park in Vahtivuori, Kuopio, Finland. The Kuopio Museum is the third oldest specially built museum building in Finland after the Helsinki's Ateneum (1887) and the Turku's Art Museum (1904). It has national romantic features and was inspired by Finnish castles, such as St. Olaf's Castle and Vyborg Castle. The building's architect was J. V. Strömberg, who designed a significant number of Kuopio's public buildings at the turn of the 20th century. The Kuopio Museum houses the exhibition facilities of the Kuopio Museum of Natural History and the Kuopio Museum of Cultural History. The museum is visited by an average of about 30,000 visitors a year.

== New extension ==
The City of Kuopio organized an invited architectural competition for the renovation and expansion of the Kuopio Museum in 2016. The competition was won by architects Aki Davidsson and Jaana Tarkela with their entry called "Hila". The new extension was opened in 2021.

== Mammoth ==
One of Kuopio Museum's main attractions since around the beginning of the new millennium has been a restored mammoth called Häkä. The installation was completed in connection with the renewal of the main exhibitions of the Natural History Museum in 1999. The name "Häkä" was derived from Kari Häkämies, at that time the Minister of the Interior, and formerly the Mayor of Kuopio, who officiated the unveiling of the exhibit on 3 June 1999. Woolly mammoths are said to have once lived in the Kuopio region. An accurate model for the mammoth was the carcass of a well-preserved frozen mammoth found in 1799 by O. Šumahov, a local hunter and ivory collector, in the Lena River valley of Siberia. It was estimated that on its death it would have been about 30 years old and weighed 5,000 to 5,500 pounds. The height at the withers was over three meters. The mammoth exhibit was made by conservator and artist Eirik Granqvist.

== Sources ==
- Helena Riekki (2005). Kuopion kaupungin rakennushistoria – Kaupungin rakentamisvaiheita vuodesta 1875 (in Finnish). City of Kuopio. ISBN 951-842-293-1.
