= Pehr W. Palmroth =

Swedish architect (1765–1825)

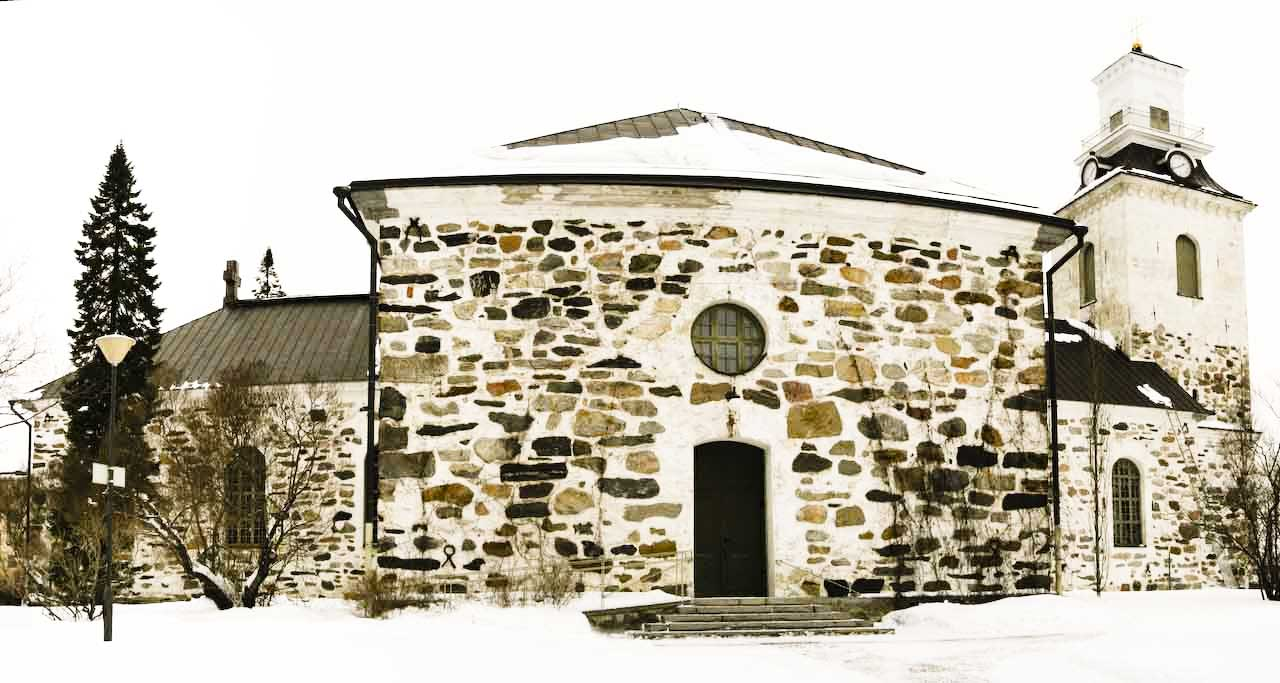
Kuopio Cathedral

Petter "Pehr" Wilhelm Palmroth (1765–1825) was a Swedish architect who worked in the Stockholm superintendent's office.

He is known for his numerous churches, which Palmroth designed in various parts of Sweden and Finland. His most famous works are the tower of Kungsholm Church in Stockholm and Kuopio Cathedral.

He was also the architect of Bjursås church; Östervåla church; Yxnerum church; Salem church; Långsele church; Vengan church; Virestad church; Långaryd church; Näshulta church; Vetlanda church; Västra Stenby church; Dimbo-Ottravad church; Åmål church; Tjärstad church, Malmbäck church; Västra Karup church; Lycksele church; and others.

In addition to churches, Palmroth also drew up plans for the prison in Heinola and courthouse in Helsinge.

In 1789, he resigned from the Office of the Superintendent and became an ensign in the "Sandalwood Regiment" in the Finnish War for the duration of the war, eventually returning to his work but remaining in the army in the Upplands regiment.

== Work in Finland ==
- Kauvatsa's old church (1797, demolished 1879)
- Pomarkku's old wooden church (1802), built as a copy of Kauvatsa's old church
- Piikkiö church bell tower (1810)
- Kuopio Cathedral (1816)
