= Vahtivuori =

City district in Kuopio, Finland

Coordinates: 62°53′38″N 27°41′24″E

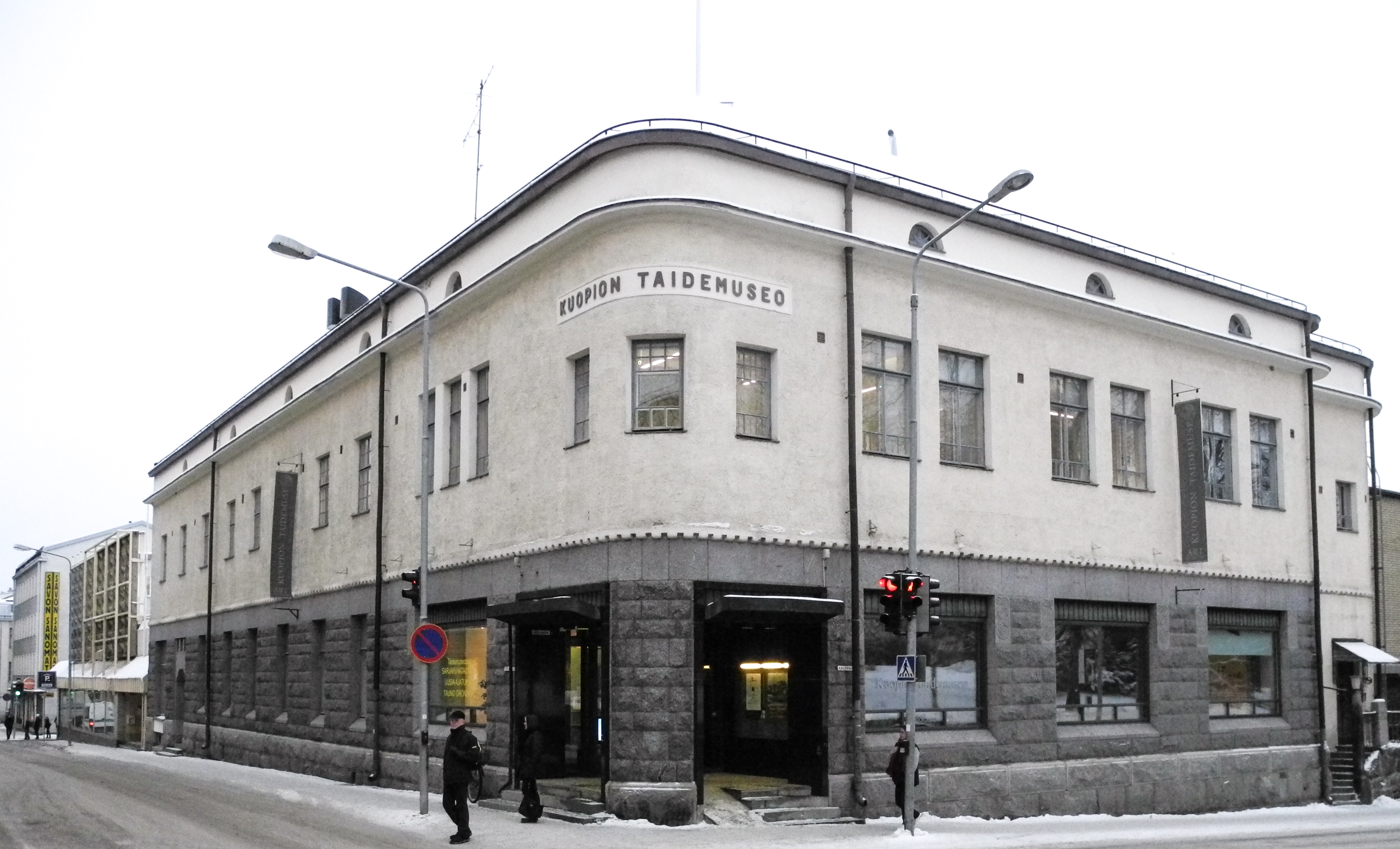
Kuopio Art Museum in Vahtivuori

Vahtivuori is a district in the city of Kuopio, Finland, located between the city center and Lake Kallavesi. The southern boundary of Vahtivuori is Minna Canthin katu, the western boundary is Vuorikatu, the northern boundary is Suokatu and the eastern boundary is formed by Lake Kallavesi. The neighboring parts of Vahtivuori are Maljalahti in the north, Väinölänniemi in the south and Multimäki in the west.

Among others, Kuopio Cathedral, Kuopio Museum, Kuopio City Library, Kuopio Art Museum, Snellman School and Port of Kuopio are located in the Vahtivuori district. The area also includes Muikkuravintola Sampo restaurant (muikku means "vendace"). Several events are organized by the Kuopio Passenger Port every year, such as the Kuopio Wine Festival. The district has changed considerably over a hundred years as a result of human activities, including civil engineering. As early as the beginning of the 20th century, the surface of Lake Kallavesi extended almost to Maaherrankatu between Suokatu and Lukkarinkatu. The land has thus grown significantly and new apartment buildings have been added to the area.

== See also ==
- Snellman Park
