= The Wounded Angel =

Painting by Hugo Simberg

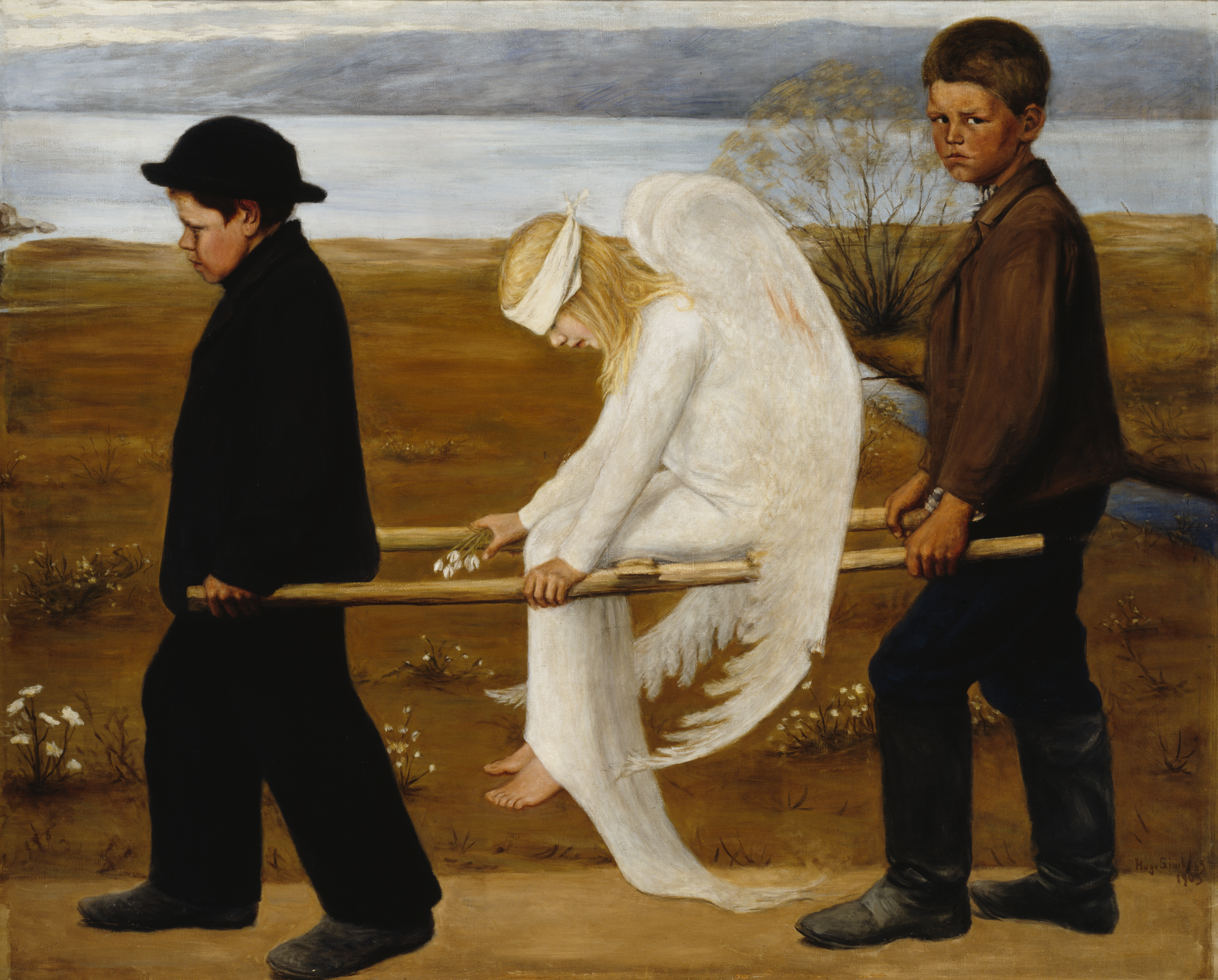
- Artist: Hugo Simberg
- Year: 1903
- Type: Oil
- Dimensions: 127 cm × 154 cm (50 in × 61 in)
- Location: Ateneum, Helsinki

The Wounded Angel (Finnish: Haavoittunut enkeli; Swedish: Den sårade ängeln; 1903) is a painting by Finnish symbolist painter Hugo Simberg. It is one of the most recognizable of Simberg's works, and was voted Finland's "national painting" in a vote held by the Ateneum art museum in 2006. In a similar 2013 vote held by medal and coin vendor Suomen Moneta, it was voted second most important.

== The painting ==
The Wounded Angel depicts two boys carrying an injured angel, whose forehead is bandaged and whose wing is bloodied. The angel is carrying some white flowers and her head is lowered. Like other Simberg works, the atmosphere is melancholic: the angelic central figure with her bandaged forehead and bloodied wing, the sombre clothing of her two youthful bearers. The right-hand figure's gaze is fixated beyond and to the right of the viewer.

The procession passes through a recognisable landscape, that of Eläintarha, Helsinki, with Töölönlahti Bay in the background. The same road still skirts Töölönlahti Bay. In Hugo Simberg's time, the park was a popular spot for leisure-time activities among the working classes. At the time, many charity institutions were located in Eläintarha park; in The Wounded Angel, the healthy boys are carrying the injured girl towards the Blind Girls' School and the Home for Cripples. She clutches a bunch of snowdrops, symbolic of healing and rebirth.

Simberg himself declined to offer any interpretation, suggesting that the viewer draw their own conclusions. However, Simberg had been suffering from meningitis, and the painting was a source of strength during his recovery.

A number of Finnish artists praised The Wounded Angel when it first displayed in 1903 at the Ateneum autumn exhibition. In a letter to his sister Blenda, Simberg wrote on 10 October 1903: "I wanted to share the good news with you – I was not rejected this year, even though the jury was terribly strict. It seems that I have achieved something of a grand succés among my colleagues and the members of the jury. Gallén is so excited that I can hardly take him seriously. His first words were the highest flattery of my work and, oddly, he seems quite beside himself with enthusiasm for the big painting. He says that it gives him the impression that I had stood alone in a little cabin, huddled in the midst of a great forest, and had painted in complete indifference to the outside world. He says that it radiates peace and harmony like no other work in the exhibition – Even Edelfelt said nice things to me."

When Simberg was asked to paint frescoes for the Tampere Cathedral in 1905–06, one was a larger version of The Wounded Angel, his favorite painting.

== Gallery ==
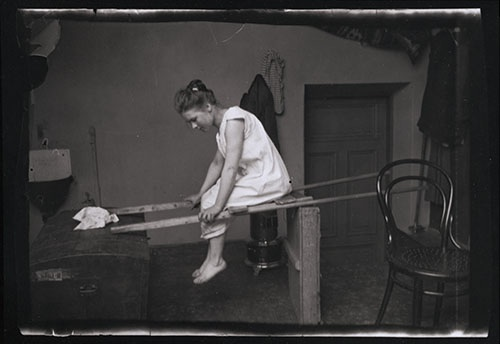
Study for The Wounded Angel, 1902

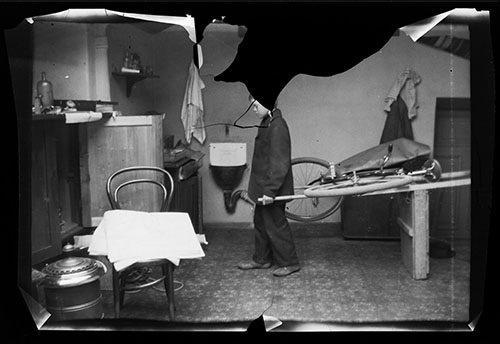
Another study for The Wounded Angel, 1902

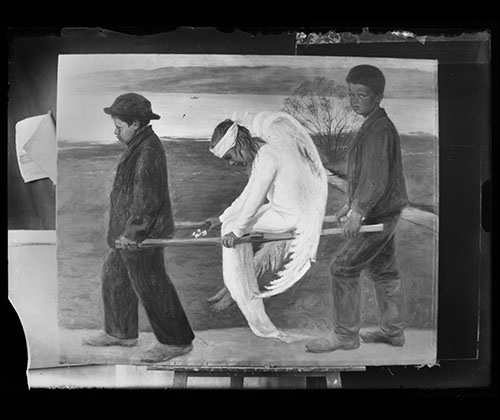
Photograph from 1902–1903 of the painting in progress

== Impact on later works ==
The painting inspired the album cover for Spiritual Black Dimensions (1999) by Dimmu Borgir.

The painting partially inspired the music video for the Nightwish song "Amaranth" (2007).

The painting has a strong symbolic role in the Apple TV series Constellation (2024).

== See also ==
- On Your Mark – short film written and directed by Hayao Miyazaki with a similar motif
