= Tampere Cathedral =

Cathedral in Tampere, Finland

Tampere Cathedral Tampereen tuomiokirkko Tammerfors domkyrka
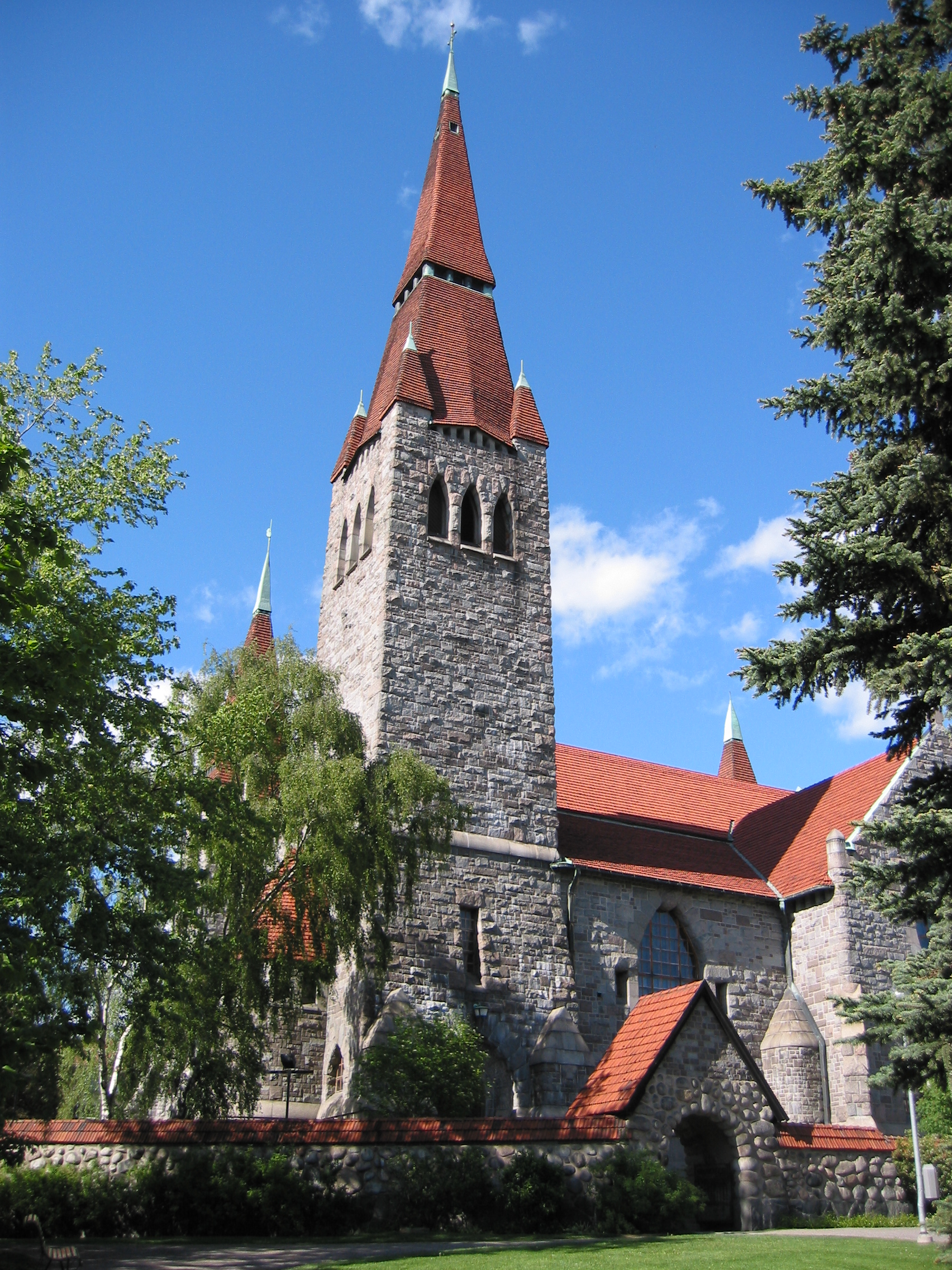

Religion
- Affiliation: Evangelical Lutheran Church of Finland
- District: Diocese of Tampere
- Ecclesiastical or organisational status: Cathedral

Location
- Location: Tuomiokirkonkatu 3b, Jussinkylä, Tampere, Finland
- Interactive map of Tampere Cathedral; Tampereen tuomiokirkko Tammerfors domkyrka
- Coordinates: 61°30′9″N 23°46′11″E

Architecture
- Architect: Lars Sonck
- Type: Cathedral
- Style: National Romantic style
- Completed: 1907
- Height (max): 64.0

Tampere Cathedral (Finnish: Tampereen tuomiokirkko, Swedish: Tammerfors domkyrka; originally known as St. John's Church) is a Lutheran church in Tampere, Finland, and the seat of the Diocese of Tampere. The building was designed in the National Romantic style by Lars Sonck, and built between 1902 and 1907.

The cathedral is famous for its frescoes, painted by the symbolist Hugo Simberg between 1905 and 1906. The paintings aroused considerable adverse criticism in their time, featuring versions of Simberg's The Wounded Angel and The Garden of Death. Of particular controversy was Simberg's painting of a winged serpent on a red background in the highest point of the ceiling, which some contemporaries interpreted as a symbol of sin and corruption. The altar-piece, representing the future resurrection of people of all races, was painted by Magnus Enckell.

Yleisradio (YLE) broadcast the first radio church service from Tampere Cathedral on 12 September 1926.
