= Kuopio Cathedral =

Lutheran cathedral in Kuopio, Finland

Kuopio Cathedral Kuopion tuomiokirkko Kuopio domkyrka
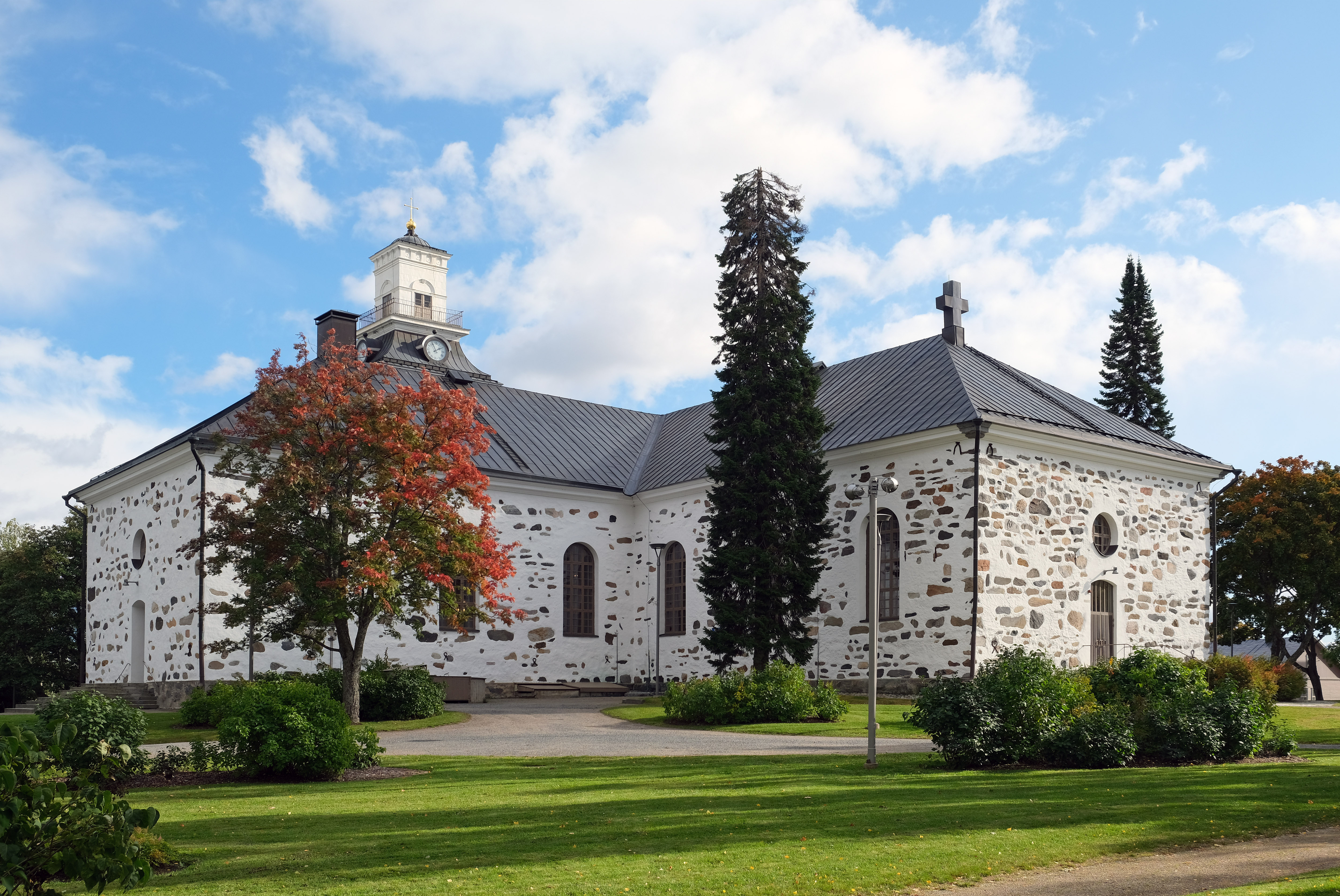
- Kuopio Cathedral

Religion
- Affiliation: Evangelical Lutheran Church of Finland
- District: Diocese of Kuopio
- Ecclesiastical or organisational status: Cathedral

Location
- Location: Vahtivuori, Kuopio, Finland
- Interactive map of Kuopio Cathedral; Kuopion tuomiokirkko Kuopio domkyrka
- Coordinates: 62°53′28″N 027°41′02″E

Architecture
- Architect: Pehr W. Palmrooth
- Type: Cathedral
- Style: Neoclassical
- Completed: 1816
- Capacity: 1500 seats

Kuopio Cathedral (Finnish: Kuopion tuomiokirkko, Swedish: Kuopio domkyrka) is a stone Neoclassical-style Evangelical Lutheran church in Kuopio, Finland, and the seat of the Diocese of Kuopio. The cathedral was built between 1806 and 1815. There is a bust of Johan Vilhelm Snellman in the square in front of the cathedral.

According to George Renwick, during the Finnish War, it was briefly used as a stable by the invaders.

== See also ==
- Saint Nicholas Cathedral, Kuopio
- Snellman Park
