= Snellman Park =

Park in Kuopio, Finland

Coordinates: 62°53′29.04″N 27°41′11.04″E

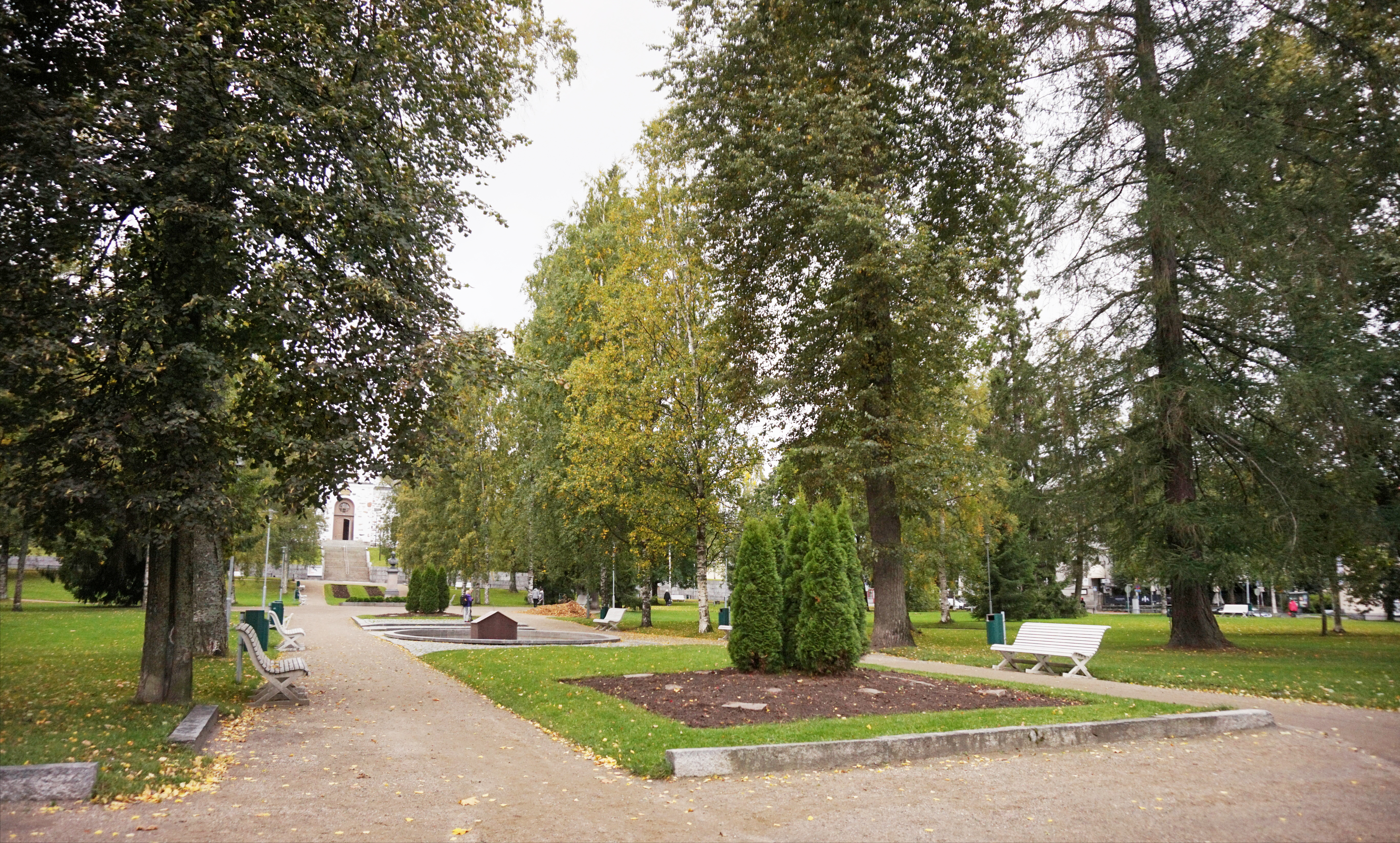
The Snellman Park in 2017

The Snellman Park (Finnish: Snellmaninpuisto) is the oldest park in the city of Kuopio, Finland, located at the Vahtivuori district in the city center between the Kauppakatu and Minna Canthin katu streets, in the adjacent block of Kuopio Cathedral. The park covers an area of 1.4 hectares. Today, the park and its surroundings are part of the larger Kuopio National City Park, established in late 2017. The park is named after J. V. Snellman (1806–1881), the senator and the Fennoman, who influenced the affairs of the Grand Duchy from Kuopio, among other places.

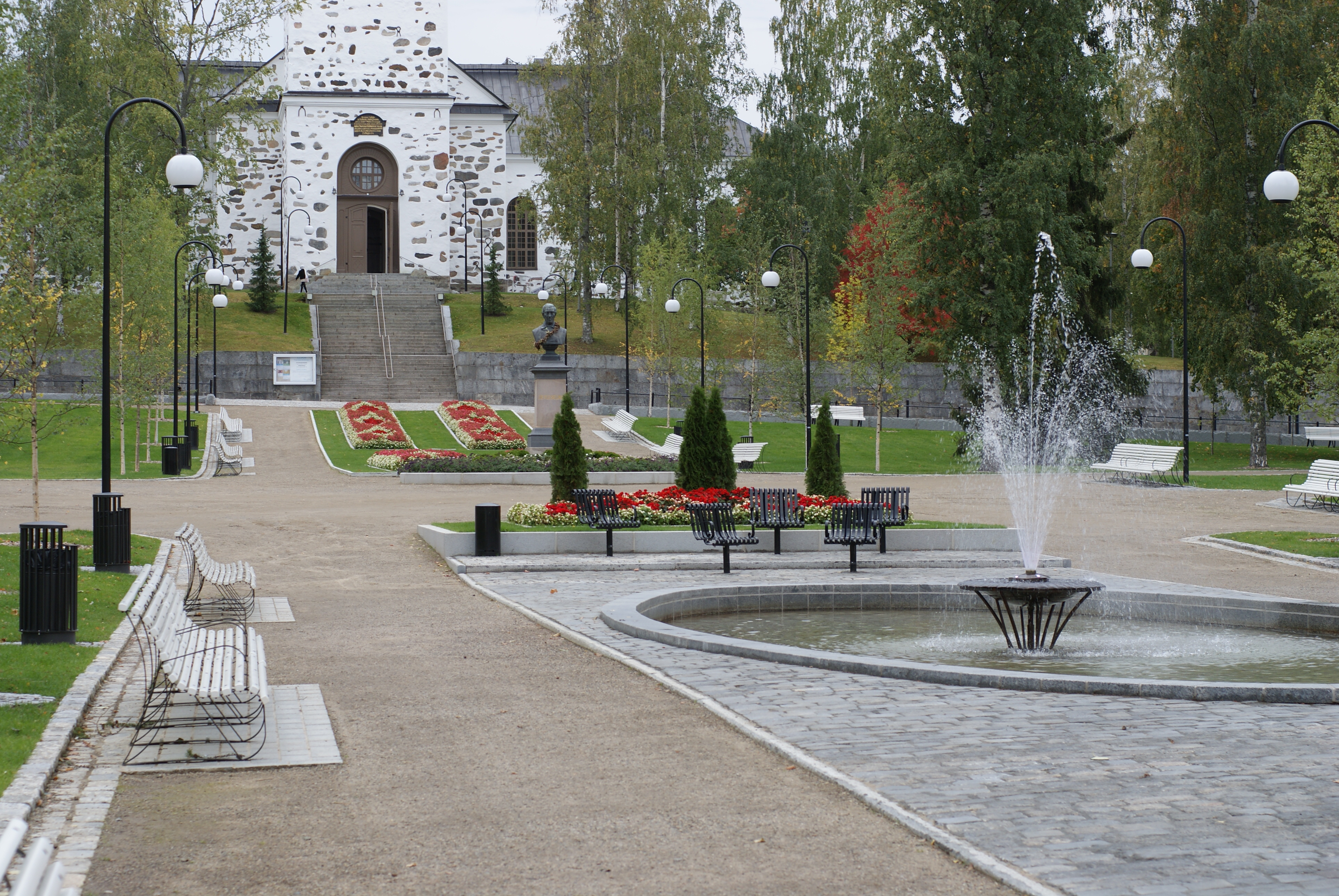
Park front of the Kuopio Cathedral

Prior to the park phase, the first main market in the city, known as Kustaantori ("Gustav Square"), Suurtori ("Grand Square") or Kirkkotori ("Church Square"), was located in the Snellman Park area. From 1842, trees were planted in the area and around the cathedral, initially aspens. In the 1850s, the old market square was moved to the site of the current Kuopio Market Square, and the former market square began to be converted more widely into a park. The park was known as Kirkkopuisto ("Church Park") for its close location to the cathedral. In the middle of the park, a bust of J. V. Snellman sculpted by Johannes Takanen was unveiled on July 3, 1886, which largely led to the use of the park’s current name. The park area has been modified in several phases; in 2018–2019, as part of the renovation of the park, a large part of the older stand will be felled. In this case, weak trees can be removed and enough space is cleared for the light that the new tree seedlings need.

The Finnish Heritage Agency classifies the Snellman Park and Kuopio Cathedral and its surroundings as a nationally significant target area for the built cultural environment (Snellman Park, Kuopio Cathedral and wooden blocks).
