= Saint Nicholas Cathedral, Kuopio =

Finnish Orthodox cathedral in Kuopio

Saint Nicholas Cathedral
- Finnish: Pyhän Nikolaoksen katedraali Swedish: Helige Nikolaus katedral Russian: Никольский собор
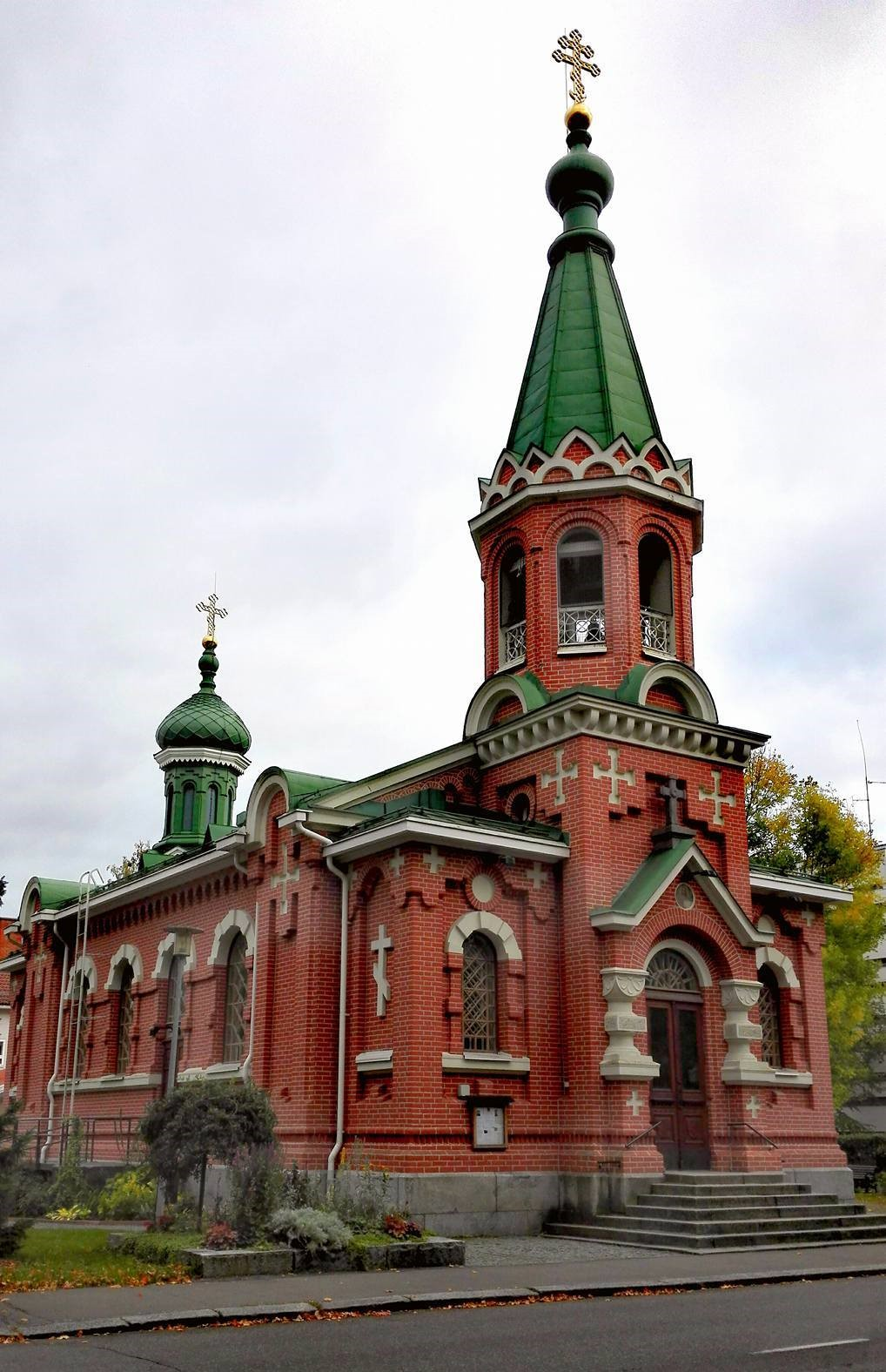
- Saint Nicholas Cathedral
- 62°53′17.74″N 27°41′25.30″E
- Location: Väinölänniemi, Kuopio
- Country: Finland
- Denomination: Eastern Orthodox

History
- Dedication: Memory of Saint Nicholas
- Consecrated: 1904

Architecture
- Functional status: Active
- Architect: Aleksander Isakson
- Architectural type: Cathedral
- Completed: 1903

Administration
- Diocese: Karelia
- Parish: Kuopio Orthodox Parish

St. Nicholas Cathedral (Finnish: Pyhän Nikolaoksen katedraali; Swedish: Helige Nikolaus katedral; Russian: Никольский собор) is the main church of the Kuopio Orthodox Parish in Väinölänniemi, Kuopio, Finland, and also the seat of the Orthodox Diocese of Karelia. The church was completed in 1903 and is dedicated to Saint Nicholas. The church, built between 1902 and 1903, was designed by the master builder Aleksander Isakson from Vyborg. The facade is plastered and painted to look like red brick, but there is also genuine brick under the plaster. In appearance, it resembles red-brick simultaneous garrison churches. The iconostasis was made at the Alexander Nevsky Lavra in Saint Petersburg and was donated by Nikolay Bobrikov, the Governor-General of Finland. There are eight bells in the cathedral.

The church was consecrated by the second Orthodox Archbishop of Finland, Archbishop Nikolai in 1904. The church was renovated betweeb 2003 and 2004, and was reopened by Archbishop Leo Makkonen in 2004. During the renovation, the gilding of the iconostasis was renewed and the interiors of the cathedral were completely renovated.

== See also ==
- Kuopio Cathedral
- St. Nicholas Church, Kotka
