= IsoCee =

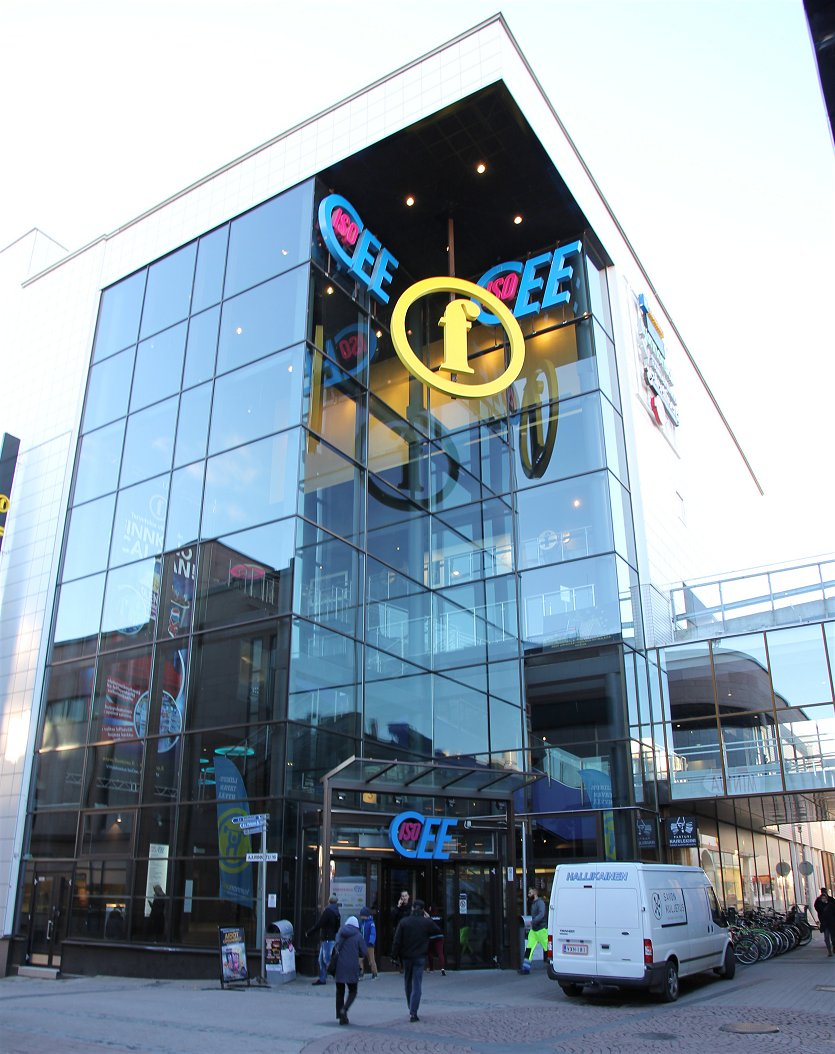
- IsoCee at the Ajurinkatu street
- Location: Multimäki, Kuopio, Finland
- Coordinates: 62°53′26″N 27°40′31″E
- Address: Ajurinkatu 16
- Opened: May 17, 2013
- Owner: Keva
- Floor area: 9,000 m^{2} (97,000 sq ft)

IsoCee is a shopping mall and entertainment center near the Kuopio Market Square in the city center of Kuopio, Finland. The street address of the shopping center built by the Carlson Group is Ajurinkatu 16, and the distance from IsoCee to the Market Square is about 150 metres (490 ft). The center includes Finnkino's Scala cinema, gym, Restaurant Taikuri and bowling alley Keilakukko. The center covers an area of about 9,000 m^{2} (97,000 sq ft). IsoCee was opened on Friday, May 17, 2013, next to the Minna Shopping Center.

In 2014, Carlson Group, which also owned the adjacent Minna Shopping Center, sold IsoCee to Keva, a public sector pension financial institution. The purchase price has been reported to be EUR 18.8 million.
