= Minna Shopping Center =

- Kauppakeskus Minna
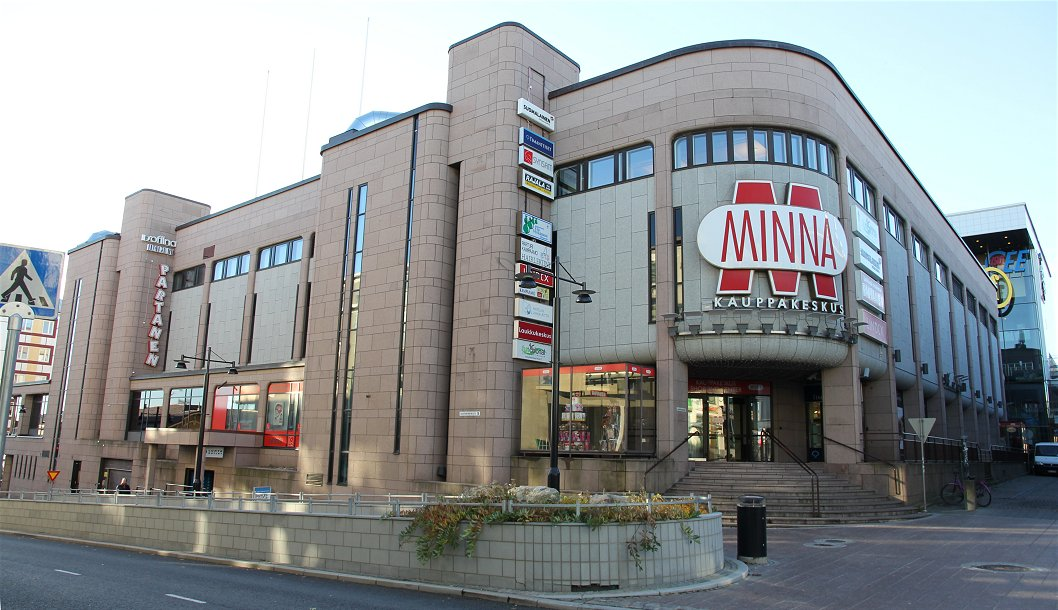
- Minna Shopping Center
- Location: Multimäki, Kuopio, Finland
- Coordinates: 62°53′26.2″N 27°40′36.1″E
- Address: Haapaniemenkatu 18
- Opened: 1988
- Owner: Keva
- Architect: Esa Malmivaara, Lauri Miikkulainen & Iiro Muraja
- Num. of stores: about 20
- Floor area: 152 m^{2} (1,640 sq ft)
- Parking: 405
- Website: kauppajaviihdekeskusminna.fi

The Minna Shopping Center (Finnish: Kauppakeskus Minna) is a shopping mall in the city center of Kuopio, Finland. It is located in the Multimäki district along the Haapaniemenkatu and Minna Canthin katu streets. The shopping mall is named after local author Minna Canth. Its neighbors include H-Talo and IsoCee.

The house was originally built by the Kuopio Merchants and Entrepreneurs Association (Kuopion kauppiaat ja yrittäjät ry) and was completed after long phases in 1988. The shopping center, originally built as a department store, used the name Savon City, but after the bankruptcy in the early 1990s and the change of ownership. Today, the shopping center is owned by Keva, the public sector pension financial institution, like the adjacent IsoCee.
