= Mercers Hall, Gloucester =

Warehouse in Gloucester, Gloucestershire, England

Coordinates: 51°51′55″N 2°14′49″W

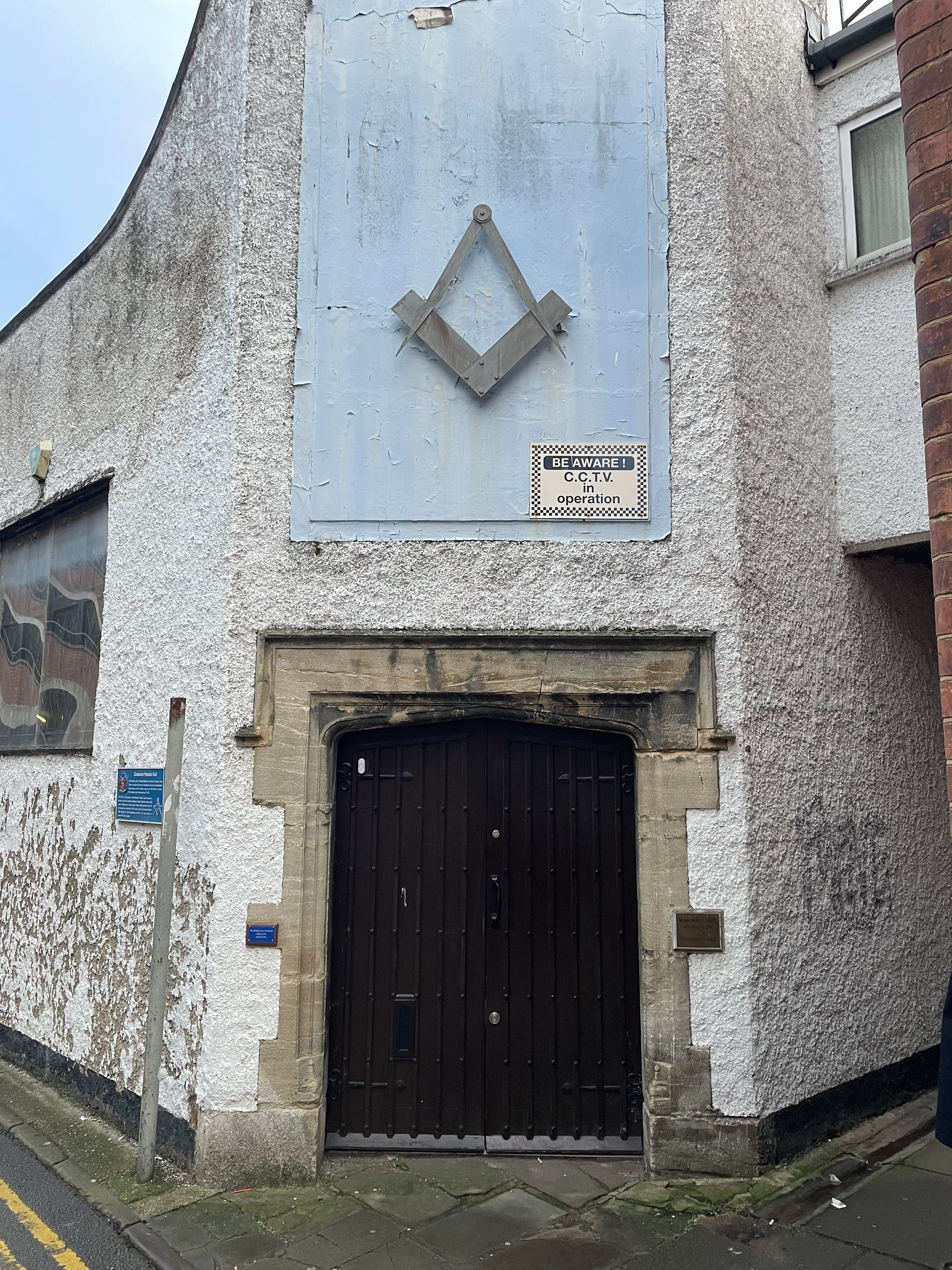
A photo of the doorway to Mercers Hall, Gloucester

Mercers Hall is a former warehouse in Gloucester, England. It is located on the corner of Cross Keys Lane and Mercers' Alley, also known as Pinchbelly Alley, in the centre of the city. It is currently used as a Masonic Hall and is grade II listed with Historic England.

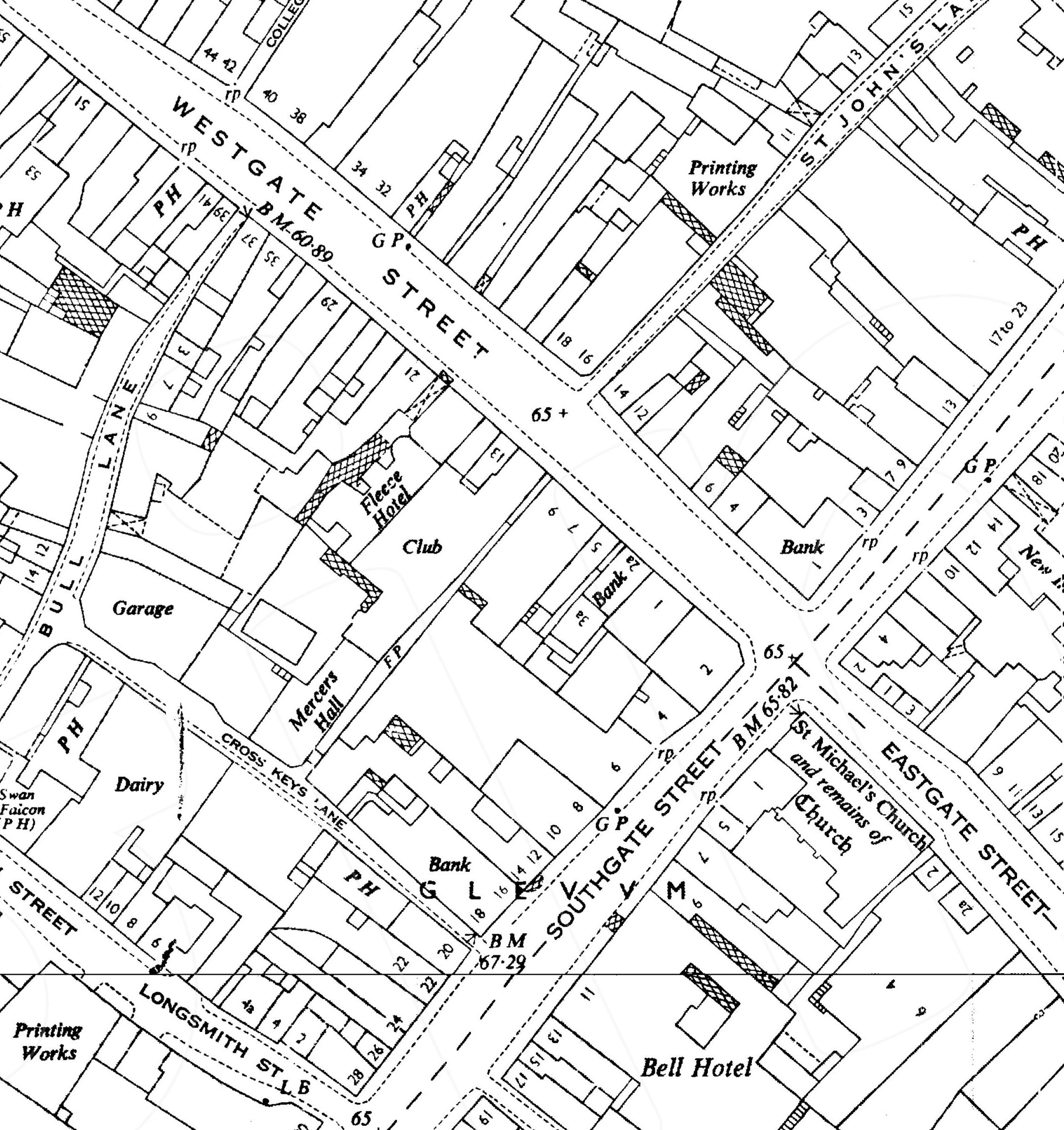
Mercers Hall (centre left) on a 1950s map.

== History ==
The building was constructed in the second half of the eighteenth century. By 1810 it was occupied by a cider merchant and brewer who used the upper floor as a grain store. It incorporates a sixteenth century roof and other timber-framed elements thought to have been taken from a market hall in Gloucester owned by St Peter's Abbey, and from a barn. It was known as Mercer's Hall by 1878 and in 1898 was purchased by Washbourn Brothers who used it as a bonded warehouse for alcohol. In 1926 it was converted into a function room and dance hall by Charles Urch. During the Second World War it was used as a canteen for American forces, run by Gloucester Rotary Club. The hall was purchased by Gloucester Freemasons in 1955 who use it as a masonic temple for several local lodges.
