= Hietalahti market hall =

Building in Helsinki, Finland

Coordinates: 60°09′47″N 24°55′46″E

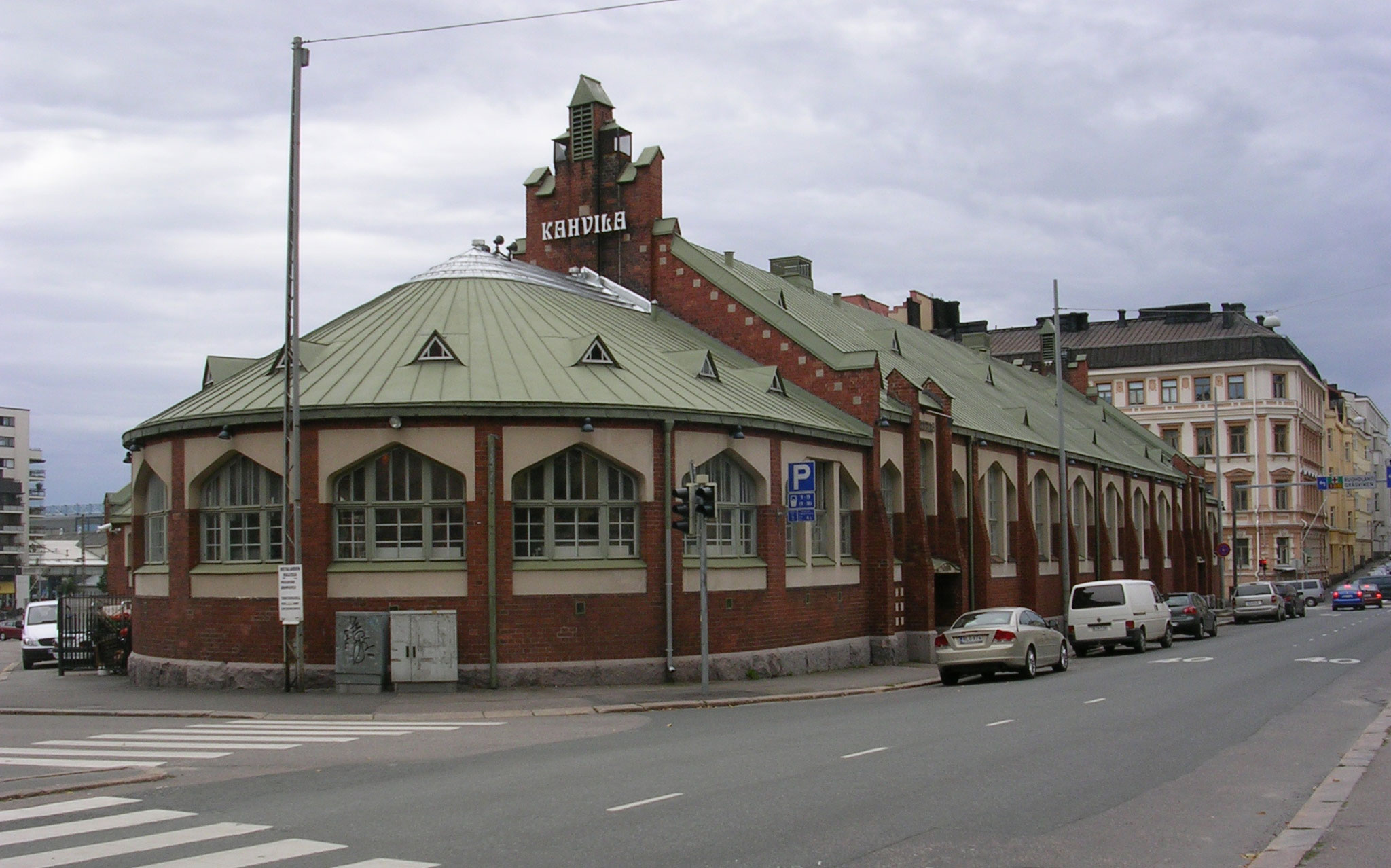
The Hietalahti market hall seen from Lönnrotinkatu.

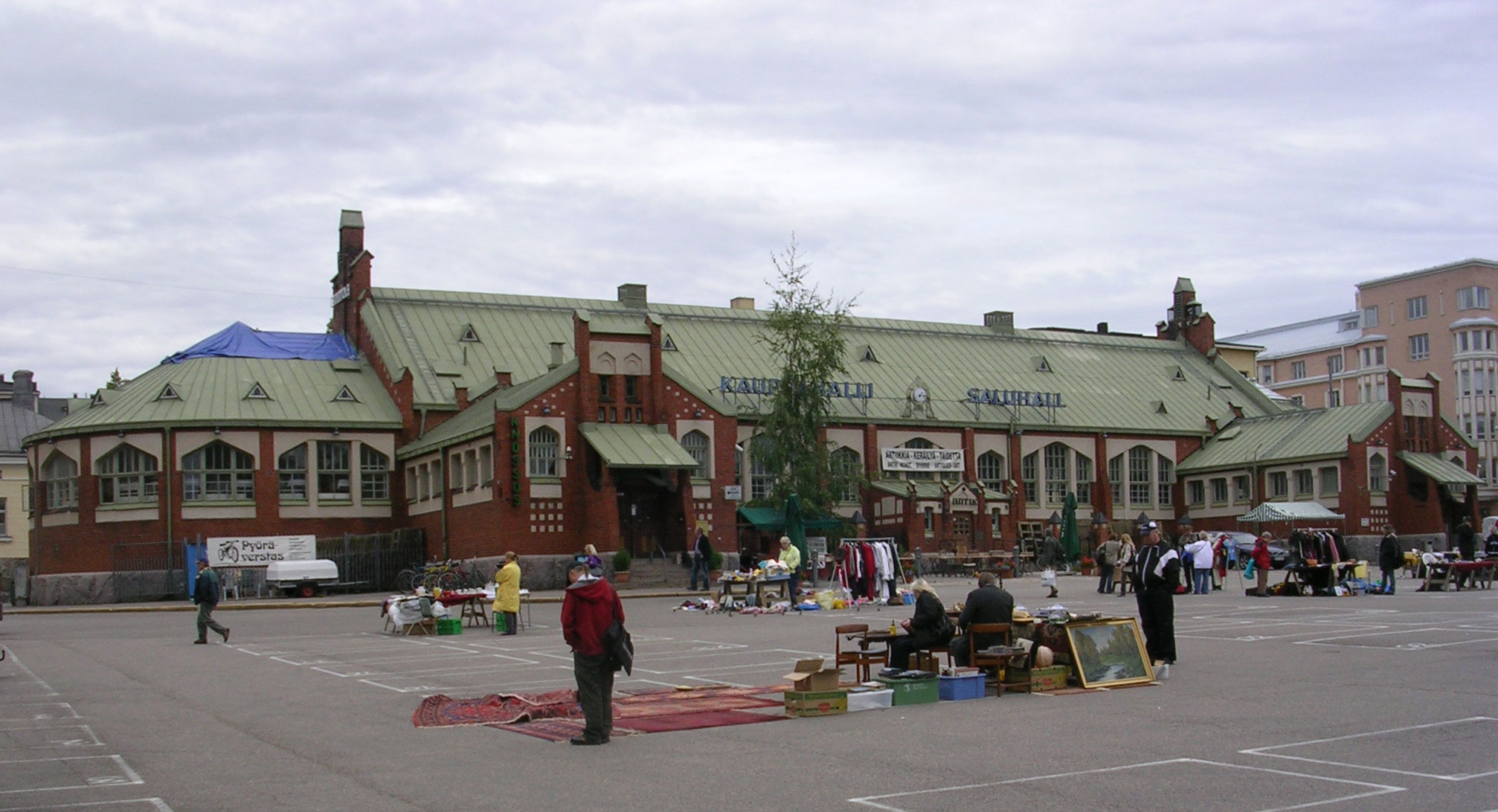
The Hietalahti market hall seen from Hietalahdentori.

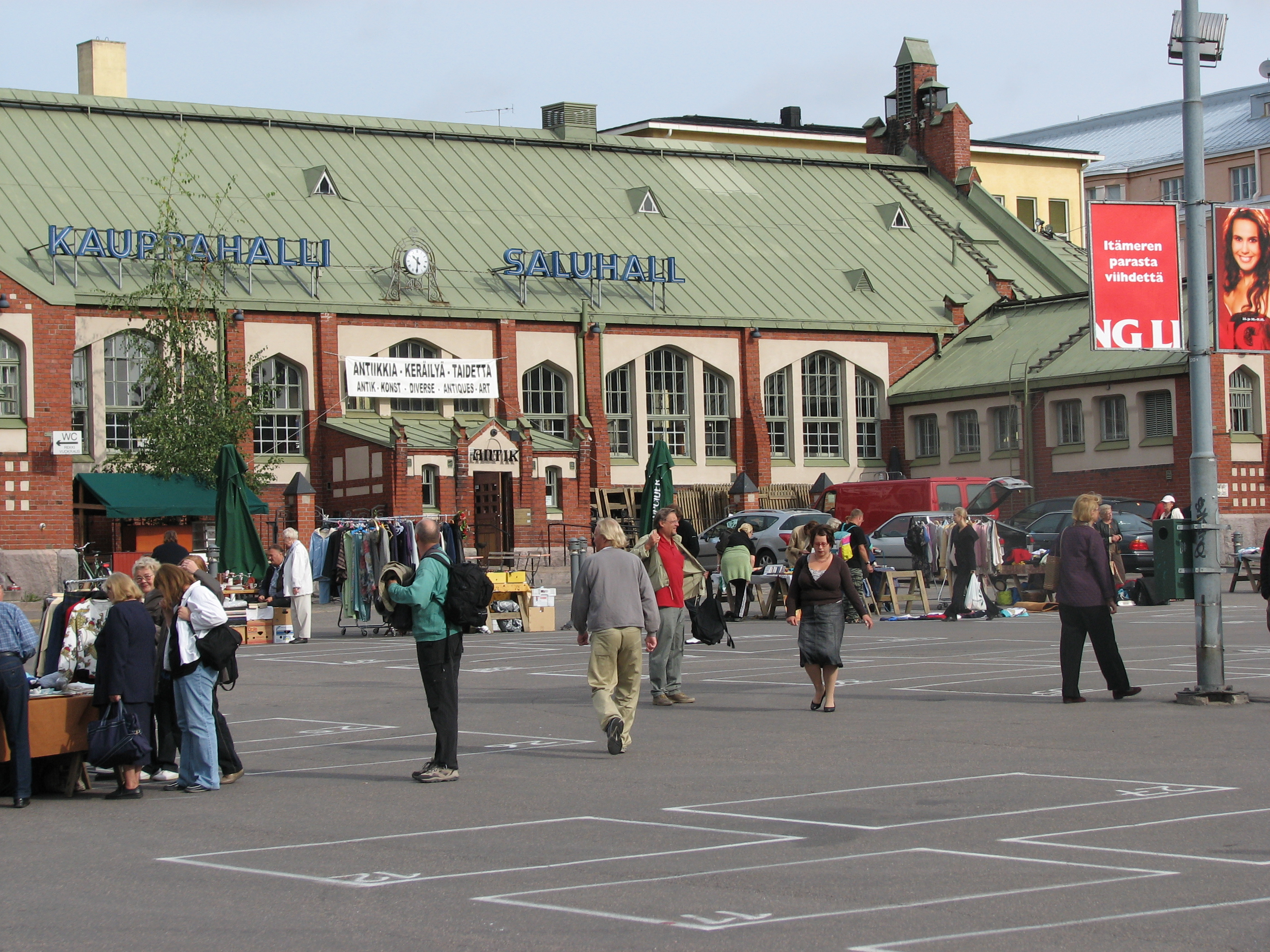
A market day at the Hietalahti market hall.

The Hietalahti market hall is an old market hall located near the Hietalahdentori market square in Helsinki, Finland, hosting several restaurants and cafés. The market hall acts as concentration for restaurants and cafés, offering Japanese, Portuguese, Italian, French and Middle Eastern cuisine both at lunchtime and in the evening.

Although the building designed by architect Selim A. Lindqvist in 1903 was believed to originally have served as a Russian cavalry barracks, it has been a market hall since the beginning. Of the market halls in the city centre, it was known for its grocery offerings for a long time, but as the Hietalahdentori market square next to it started gaining publicity about illegal trade of alcoholic beverages and tobacco by foreign tourists, this had a negative effect on the market hall's activity.

At the turn of the millennium, traditional market sales at the market hall ceased, the hall was renovated and its interior was restored. In December 2001 the hall opened as an ecological market hall, selling mostly organic products. This business idea did not pay off, so in late 2003 Kauko Korpela, founding member of the Finnish Association for Art Merchants and the Finnish Art and Antiquities Merchant Association STAY, rented the central hall building of the market hall from the city of Helsinki. Since 1 December 2003 the hall, known as the Hietalahti antiquities and arts hall, concentrated on sales of antiquities and collectables.

In autumn 2012 the hall was converted back into a grocery market hall. The building returned to its original function as a market hall on 11 February 2013. At this time, about twenty merchants moved to the market hall from the Helsinki old market hall on Eteläranta as it underwent reparations for over a year. Since 2013 the Hietalahti market hall has profiled itself most prominently as a concentration for restaurants and cafés.

== See also ==
- Old Market Hall, Helsinki
