= Old Market Hall, Helsinki =

Market hall in Helsinki, Finland

Old Market Hall
- Finnish: Vanha kauppahalli Swedish: Gamla saluhallen
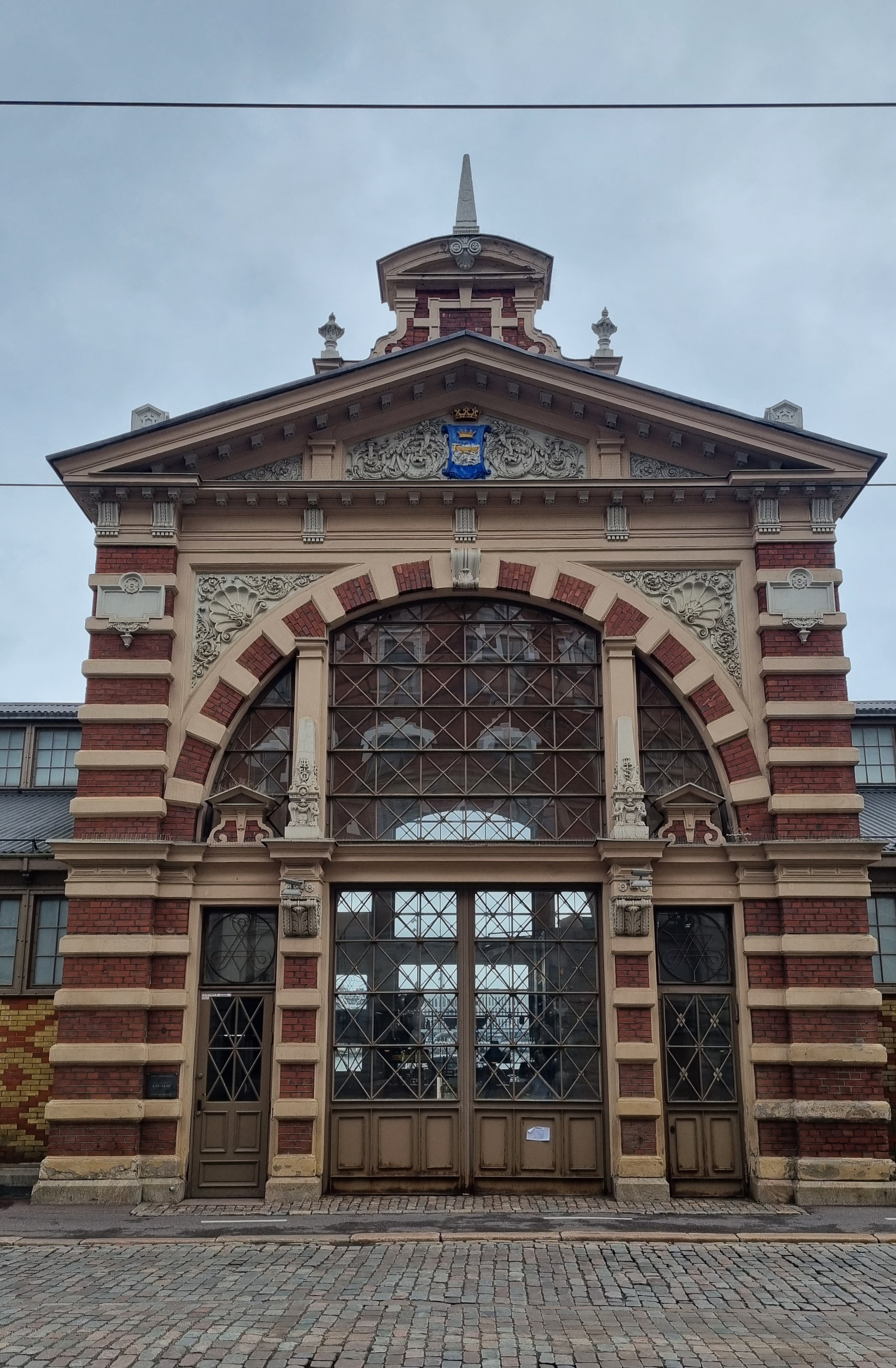
- The Old Market Hall in September 2025.
- Interactive map of the Old Market Hall area

General information
- Location: Kaartinkaupunki, Helsinki, Finland, Eteläranta
- Coordinates: 60°09′58″N 024°57′10″E
- Construction started: 1889; 137 years ago

Design and construction
- Architect: Gustaf Nyström

Website
- www.vanhakauppahalli.fi

The Old Market Hall (Finnish: Vanha kauppahalli; Swedish: Gamla saluhallen) is the oldest market hall in Helsinki, Finland. It is located along the Eteläranta street near the Helsinki Market Square in the Kaartinkaupunki district. By 2013, the hall had also become a popular tourist attraction.

== History ==
The building was designed by Gustaf Nyström and the market hall began operations in 1889 during the era of the Grand Duchy of Finland. The building represents red brick architecture. The structure of the building is made of cast iron.

The building technology of the market hall was last renovated between 2012 and 2014, when the hall was closed for a year and a half.

== See also ==
- Market Square, Helsinki
- Esplanadi
- House of Industries
- Senate Square
- Hakaniemi market hall
- Hietalahti market hall

== Sources ==
- Kirsti Toppari (1979). Vanha kauppahalli (in Finnish). Helsingin Sanomat. ISBN 978-9519134352.
- Rick Steves; Cameron Hewitt (2015). Rick Steves Snapshot St. Petersburg, Helsinki & Tallinn. Avalon Travel Publishing. ISBN 978-1631210631.
