= Tampere Market Hall =

Market hall in Tampere, Finland

Coordinates: 61°29′48.91″N 23°45′31.72″E

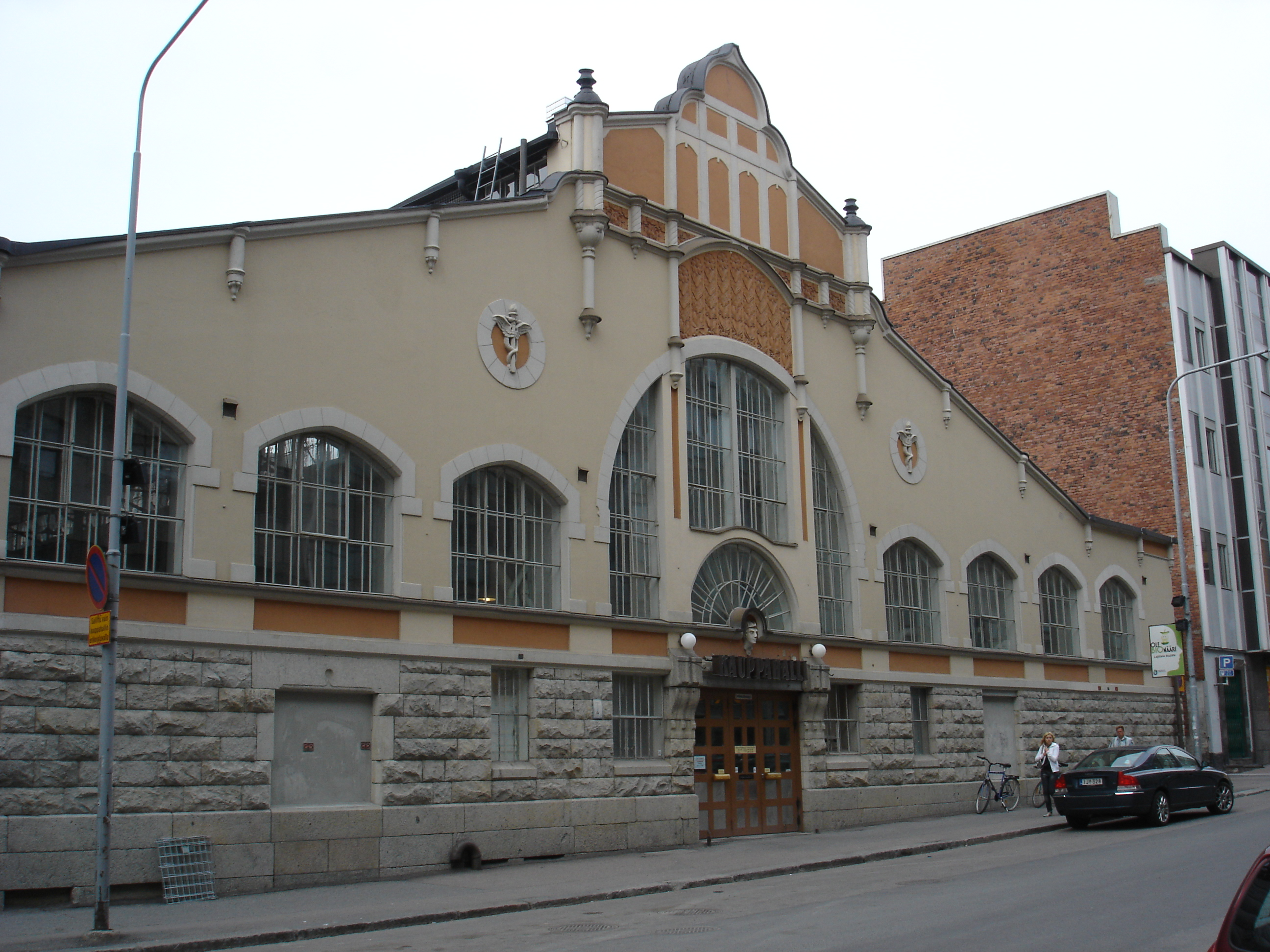
Market Hall at Hallituskatu

Tampere Market Hall (Finnish: Tampereen kauppahalli; Swedish: Tammerfors saluhall) is one of the significant market places in Tampere, Finland. It is located in the center of city, between Hämeenkatu and Hallituskatu, and it was opened in 1901. It was decided to build the market in Tampere as a result of a large and unregulated market. It is the largest market hall in the Nordic countries.

Market Hall at Christmas in 2017

The floor area of the market hall is 2,100 m^{2} and the volume is about 18,500 m³. The market hall has 174 sales outlets and in 2013 there were 39 companies operating in them. 40 percent of the outlets are used in cafeterias and restaurants, which especially the restaurant 4 Vuodenaikaa ("Four Seasons") is very popular with both locals and tourists. The longest of the current stores in the mall have been Joenniemi Flower Shop (1940–) and Lindgren Bros. Meat Shop (1949–).

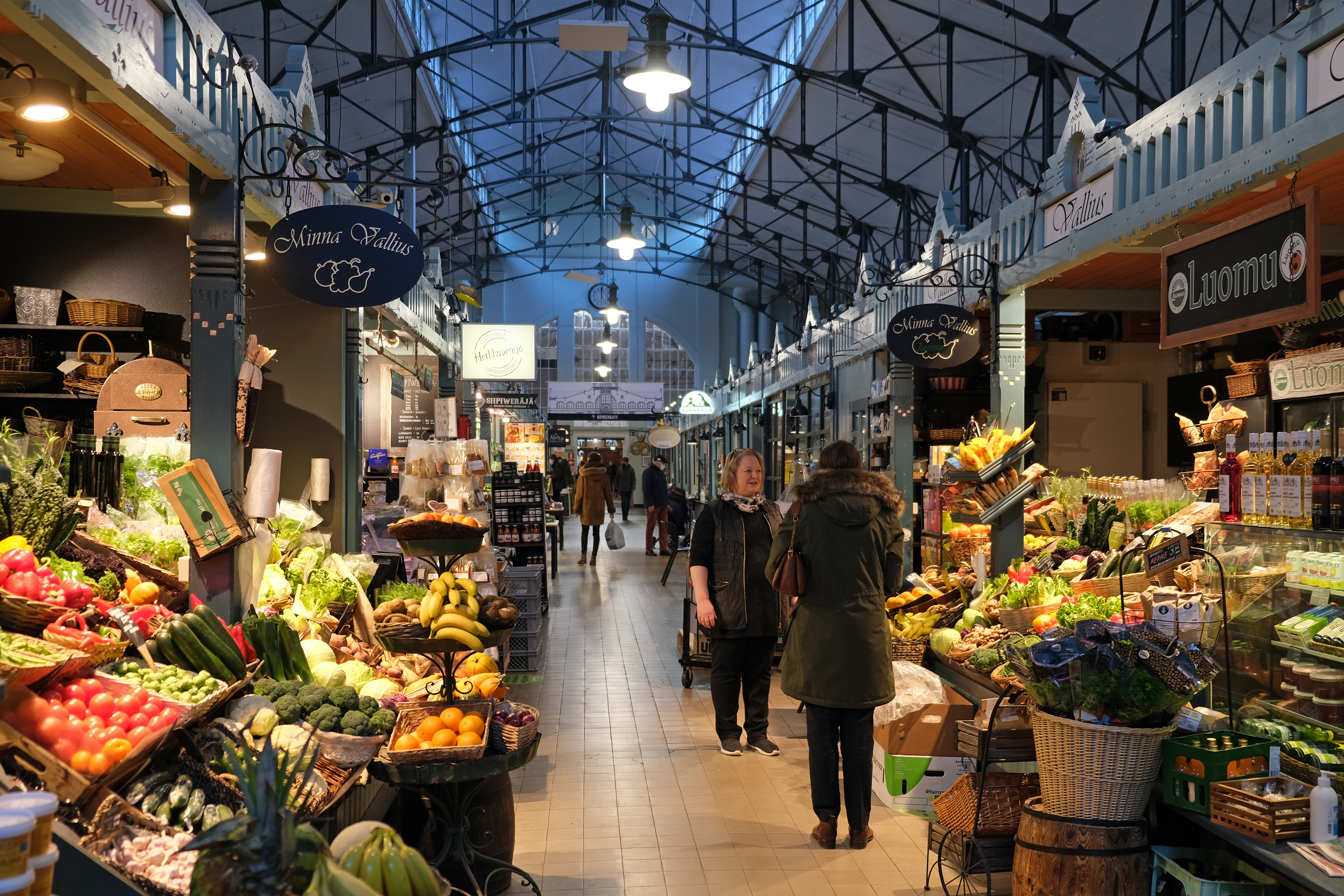
A green grocers in the Market Hall

== History ==
The building was designed by architect Hjalmar Åberg. Construction planning began in 1894 and construction in 1899. In 1973, the building was protected by a decision of the Häme Provincial Government. The protection dispute over the office building on the Hämeenkatu side of the Market Hall took place in 1972–1983 and ended in the victory of the patrons. The office building designed by Åberg is part of the same building complex as the market hall.

== See also ==
- Kuopio Market Hall
- Oulu Market Hall
- Turku Market Hall
- Vaasa Market Hall
