= Turku Market Hall =

Market hall in Turku, Finland

- Turun kauppahalli Åbo saluhall
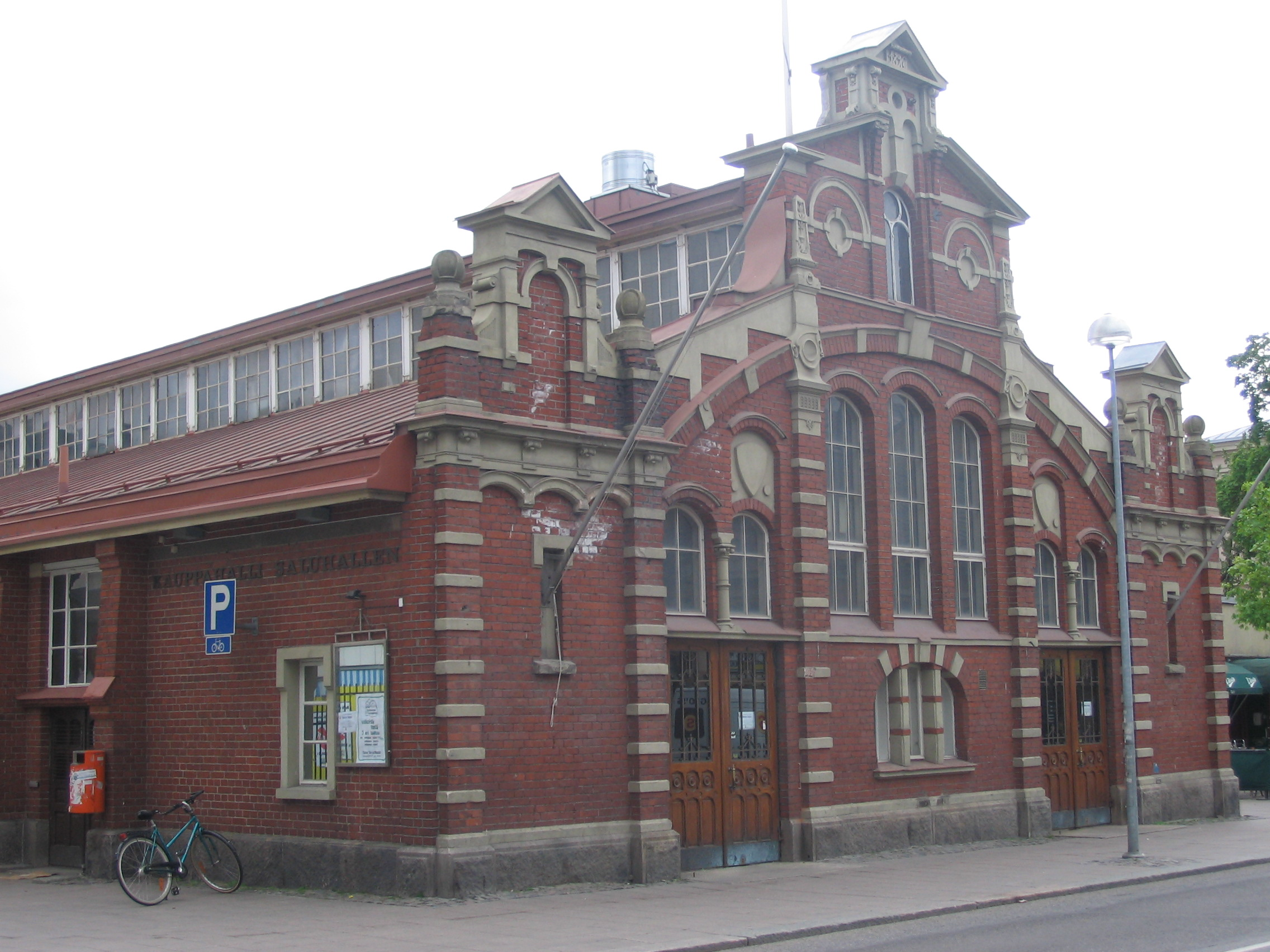
- Interactive map of the Turku Market Hall area

General information
- Location: Turku, Finland, Eerikinkatu 16
- Coordinates: 60°26′59″N 22°15′58″E
- Completed: 1896
- Renovated: 1976

Height
- Height: 13 meters

Dimensions
- Other dimensions: width: 30 meters, length: 118,5 meters

Design and construction
- Architect: Gustaf Nyström

Turku Market Hall is the second oldest market hall in Finland, and it was opened in 1896 in Turku.

== History ==
Turku Market Hall was built to address the disorderly 19th century trade taking place on the squares of Turku, where hygiene was not of a high enough standard. Gustaf Nyström had already completed the first market hall in Finland, namely the Helsinki Market Hall, in 1889. He had traveled Europe to research their construction. Thus it was natural that he was assigned with the task. The construction plan called for more than 300,000 bricks and over 42 tons of iron parts. The construction was nonetheless completed and the hall was opened to the public in 1896.

Originally the hall featured 151 shops, of which 53 were dedicated to fresh meat products. The hall was lit with gas lamps as the hall did not have electricity until 1932. On the other hand, running water was installed already in 1905, which meant that the hall had aquariums with live fish for sale, such as pikes, eels, breams and flounders.

However, in the 1950s the hall was still almost unchanged and it had fallen behind the times, lacking modern refrigeration and storage space. In 1957 the first refrigerated counters finally arrived to the hall and the first florist and stationery opened shop there.

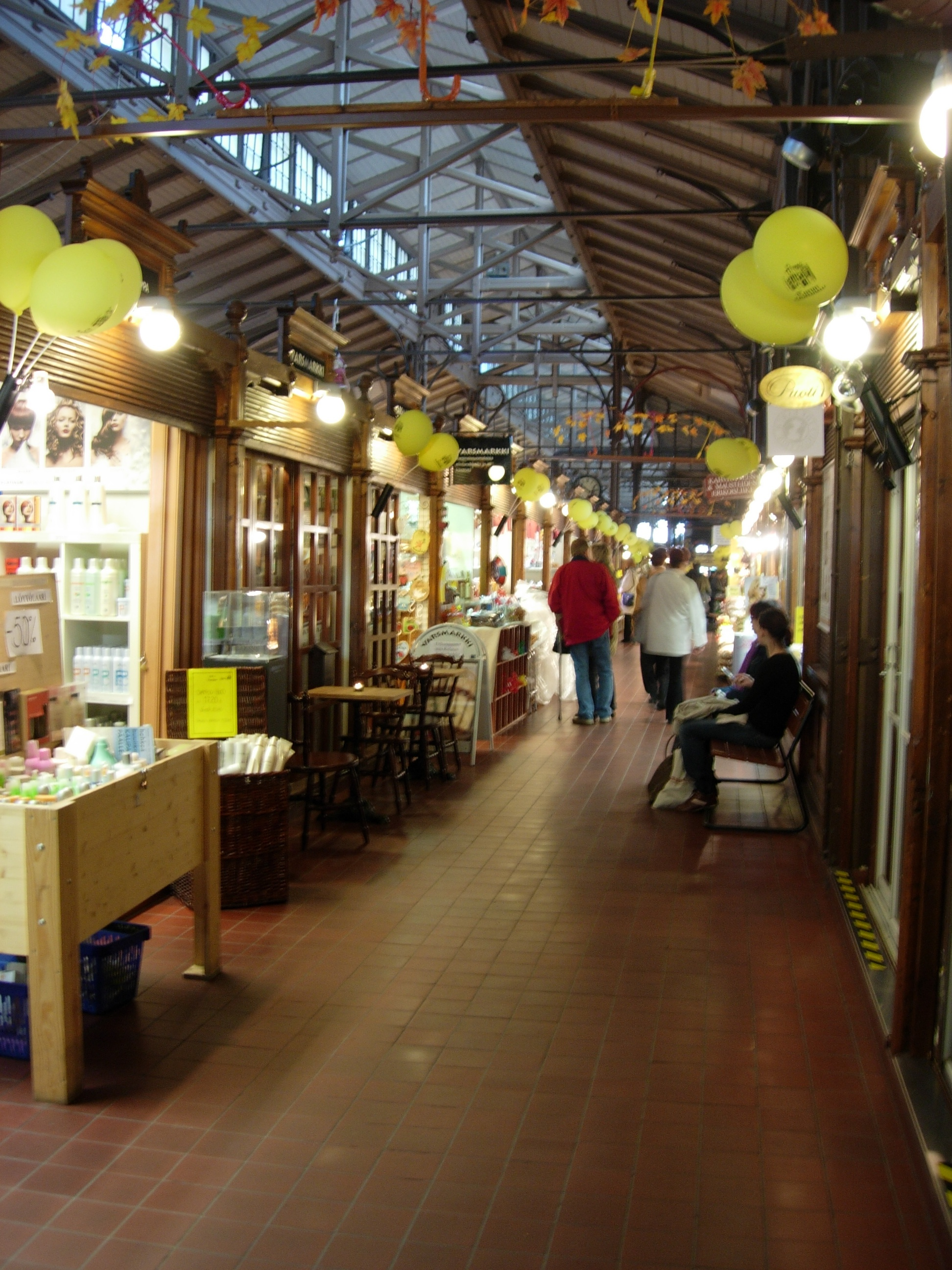
East side corridor of the Turku Market Hall

The fate of the Market Hall hung in the balance in the 1960s. The KOP was organizing a design competition for a new office building in the spring of 1960. The competition brief mentioned the demolition of the neighboring Turku Matket Hall, which was to be replaced with a new market hall along with the new office building. Viljo Revell won the competition with his proposal "Kolme koputusta" (English: Three knocks). This plan featured a large triangular building, the KOP-kolmio (English: KOP-triangle), with another adjacent office building, occupying the lot of the Turku Market Hall. The adjacent building was supposed to share a side wall with the KOP-kolmio, thus the facade facing the market hall is relatively plain.

Against the odds, and only after a long deliberation the plan for the hall's renovation was approved on 6 January 1976. The renovation was done in two phases, leaving one end of the hall continuously open for business. The renovation works were extensive, and e.g. the old marble counters had to go, replaced with stainless steel, however, the facade was left unchanged. The renovation also meant that the number of shops was cut down by half as the lots had been enlarged and some of them had been replaced with cold storage. The Market Hall also gained a new utility building next to it.

== See also ==
- Kuopio Market Hall
- Oulu Market Hall
- Tampere Market Hall
- Vaasa Market Hall
