= Oulu Market Hall =

- Oulun kauppahalli
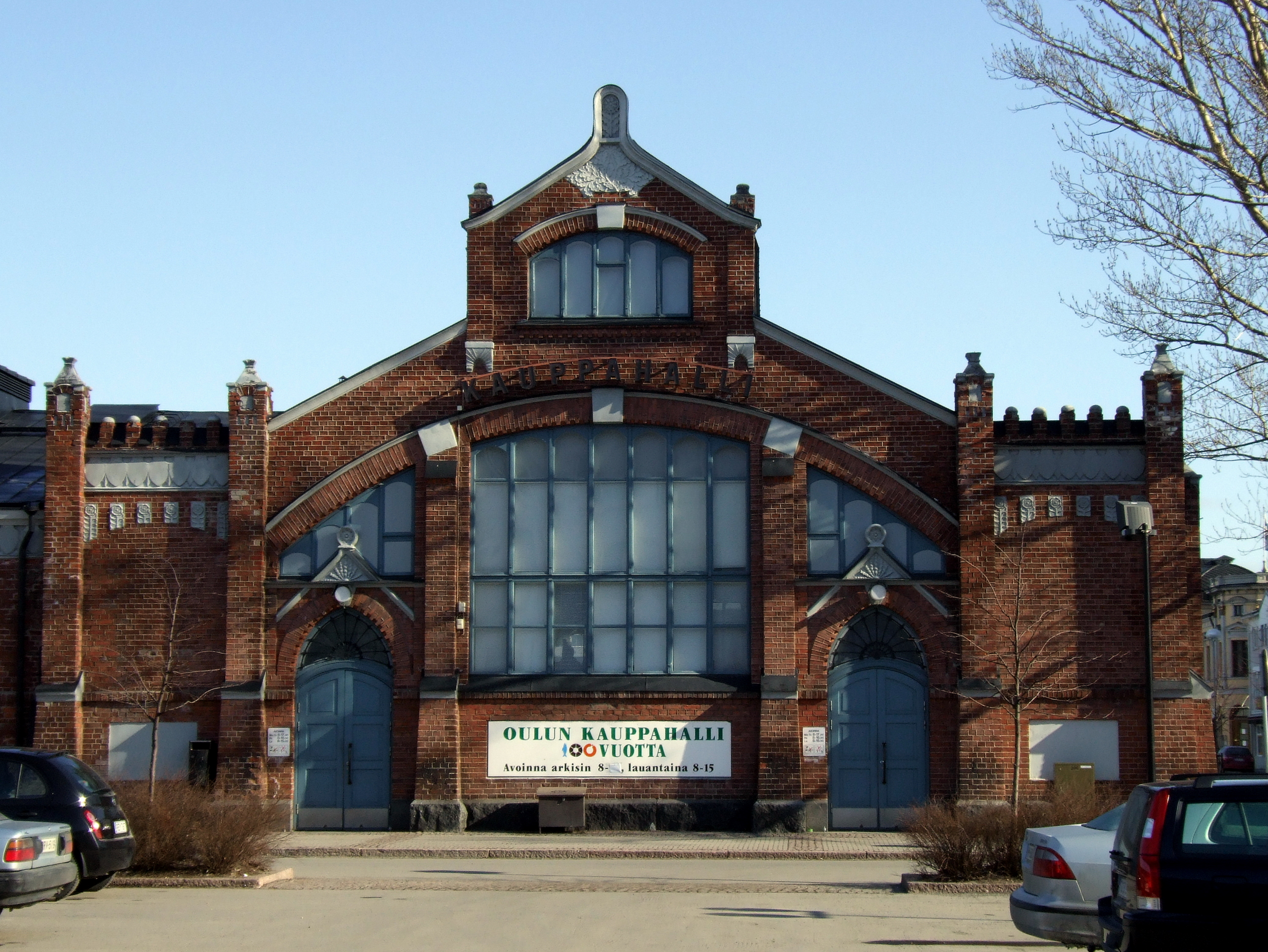

General information
- Type: Market hall
- Architectural style: Gothic Revival
- Town or city: Oulu
- Country: Finland
- Coordinates: 65°00′47″N 025°27′51″E
- Completed: 1901
- Owner: City of Oulu

Technical details
- Material: brick

Design and construction
- Architect(s): Karl Lindahl and Walter Thomé

Website
- www.oulunkauppahalli.fi

The Oulu Market Hall is a historic market hall in the Market Square, in the centre of Oulu, Finland. The market hall was opened in 1901.

The city council of Oulu decided to build the market hall in 1889 due to the tightened food safety regulations in Finland. Specifically butchers were to be moved from the open market square to the covered market. The warehouses surrounding the Hall are former granaries converted into handicraft shops. The construction of a hotel, the Oulu Market Hotel, situated next to the Hall, has been approved in 2015.

The market hall was designed by architects Karl Lindahl and Walter Thomé. It was completed in 1901. Along with two aisles there were 62 wooden shop stalls.

== See also ==
- Kuopio Market Hall
- Tampere Market Hall
- Turku Market Hall
- Vaasa Market Hall
