= Vaasa Market Hall =

Market Hall in Vaasa, Finland

- Finnish: Vaasan kauppahalli Swedish: Vasa saluhall
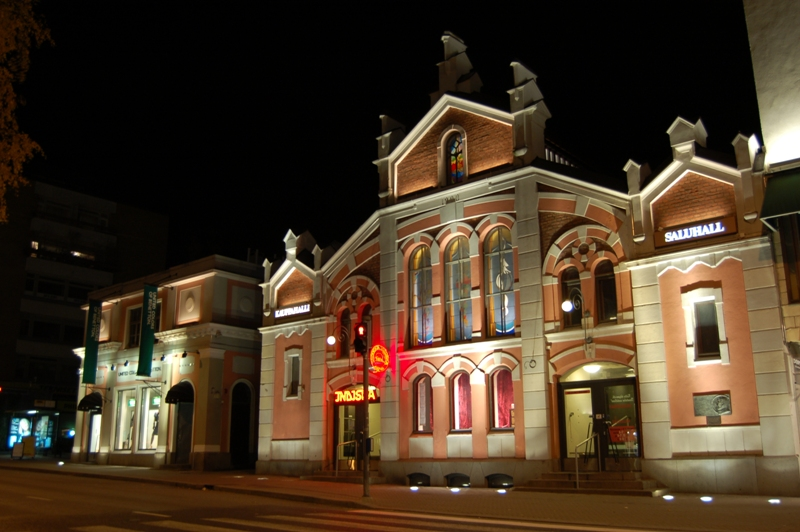
- The Vaasa Market Hall at night
- Interactive map of the Vaasa Market Hall area

General information
- Location: Vaasa, Finland, Vaasanpuistikko 18
- Coordinates: 63°05′41.46″N 021°37′04.29″E
- Inaugurated: January 1, 1902

Design and construction
- Architect: A. W. Stenfors

Vaasa Market Hall (Finnish: Vaasan kauppahalli; Swedish: Vasa saluhall) is a Gothic-style market hall in the city center of Vaasa, Finland. The market hall includes seven different shops, such as the fish store Ruostsala Snickars and the café Wasa Konditori.

The building was designed by A. W. Stenfors (1866–1952), the province architect of Vaasa, and is built in two parts. The first part, the so-called lower hall, was completed in 1902, and the latter part, the so-called upper hall, which was also built according to Stenfors' drawings, was completed in 1927. The access between the two was opened in 1963. The developer and owner of the market hall is Halli Oy, which was founded by Stenfors, court council Oskar Rewell and bank manager K. H. Majantie in 1900.

== See also ==
- Oulu Market Hall
- Tampere Market Hall
- Turku Market Hall
