= Hietalahdentori =

Square in Helsinki, Finland

Coordinates: 60°09′45″N 24°55′48″E

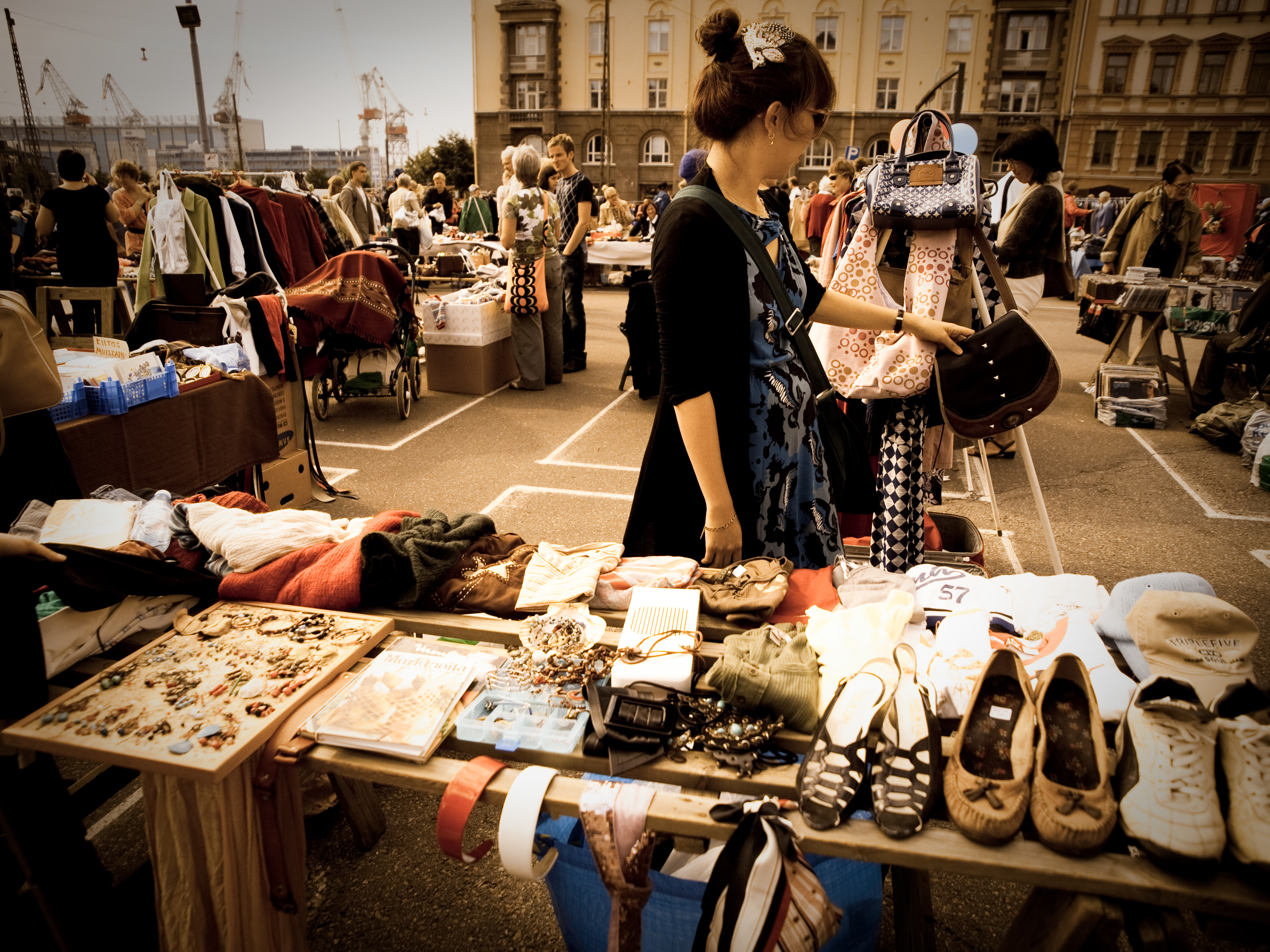
Flea market in Hietalahdentori

Hietalahdentori (Swedish: Sandvikstorget) is a square in Hietalahti in Helsinki, Finland. The area is known for its popular flea market, which is open from May to September. During World War I it was used as a Russian horse barracks. The market began in 1906, and was known for a long time for its high quality food. The other key destination on the square is the Hietalahti market hall, hosting a number of trendy restaurants.

== Sources ==
- Helsingin Sanomat, the electronic archive http://www.hs.fi/arkisto/ (surcharge)
- http://www.visithelsinki.fi/en/shopping-in-helsinki/hietalahti-market-square
