= House of the Estates =

Building in Helsinki, Finland

Coordinates: 60.17125°N 24.95371°E

The House of the Estates in Helsinki

The House of the Estates (Finnish: Säätytalo, Swedish: Ständerhuset) is a historical building in Helsinki, Finland. It is located opposite of the Bank of Finland building, immediately northeast of Helsinki Cathedral.

== Description ==
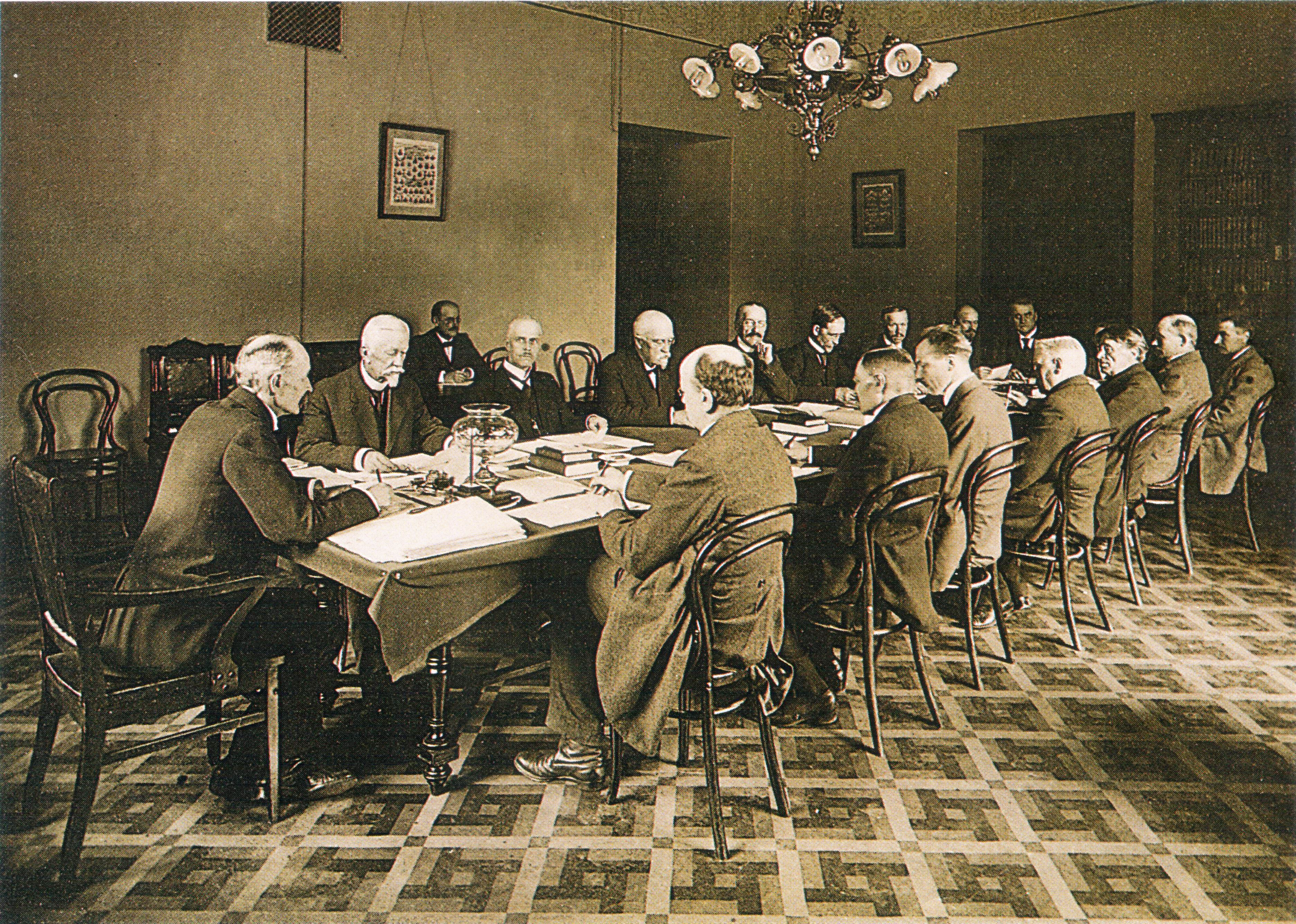
Meeting of the Constitutional Law Committee of the Finnish Parliament (Finnish: Perustuslakivaliokunta) at the House of the Estates in 1918. The chairman of the committee, K. J. Ståhlberg, at the left end of the table with his back to the camera.

It was built in 1888-1890 and inaugurated in January 1891. Architect Gustaf Nyström designed the building. The tympanum depicting Alexander I at the 1809 Diet of Finland was sculpted by Emil Wikström.

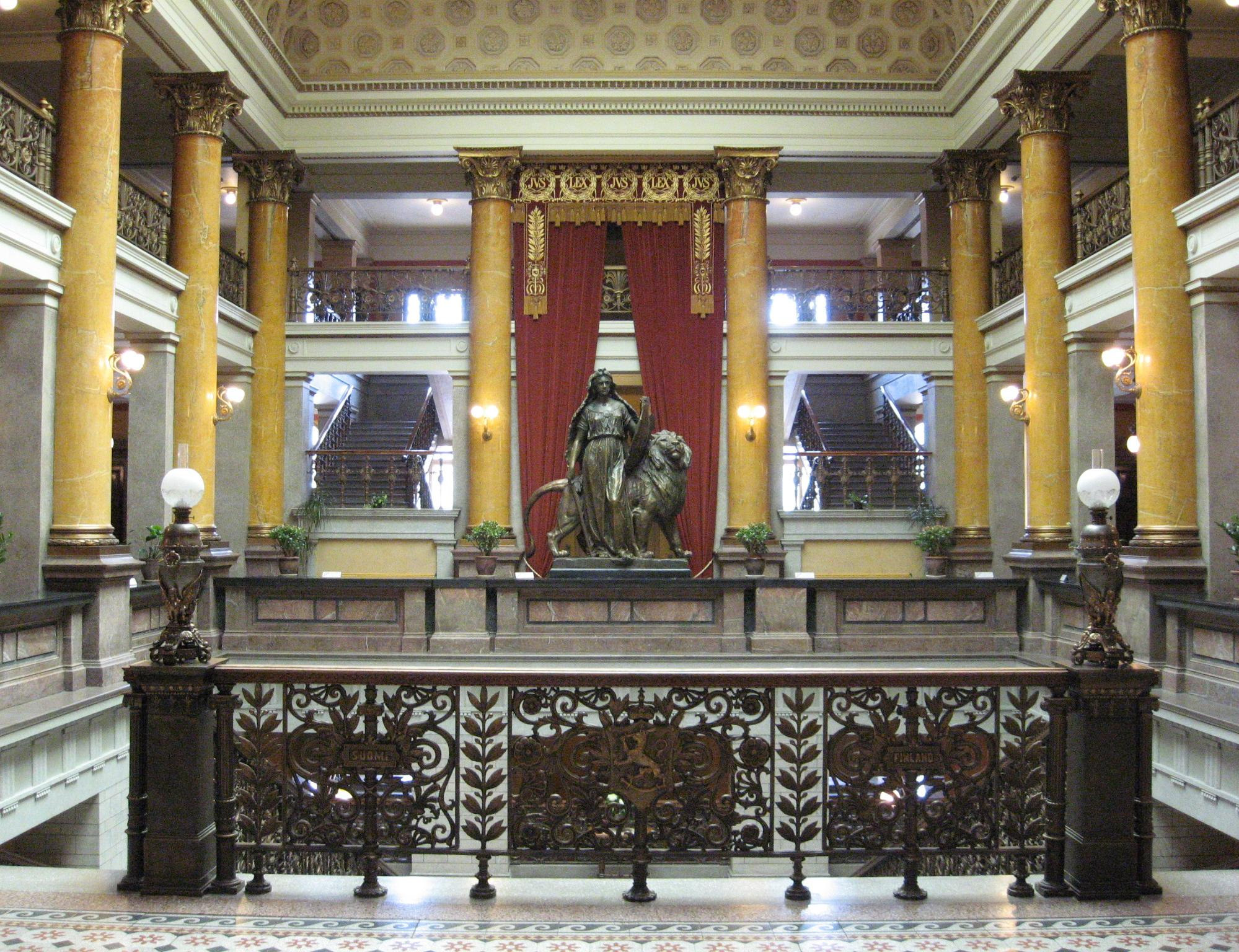
Interior and copy of Walter Runeberg's sculpture Law from the base of his statue of Alexander II.

It housed the three commoner estates of the four estates of the realm of Finland (see Diet of Finland); there is a separate House of Nobility. The estates were superseded at the 1906 parliamentary reform by the foundation of the unicameral parliament of Finland. The parliament settled elsewhere, leaving the House of the Estates for secondary usage.

Today, the House of the Estates houses sporadic governmental meetings. It is also the established location for official coalition talks after general elections and for the sessions of High Court of Impeachment. In addition, the house is used by scientific and scholarly organizations for meetings. The building is owned by the Republic of Finland through Senate Properties.
