= Kuopio Market Hall =

Market hall in Kuopio, Finland

Kuopion kauppahalli
- Kuopio Market Hall
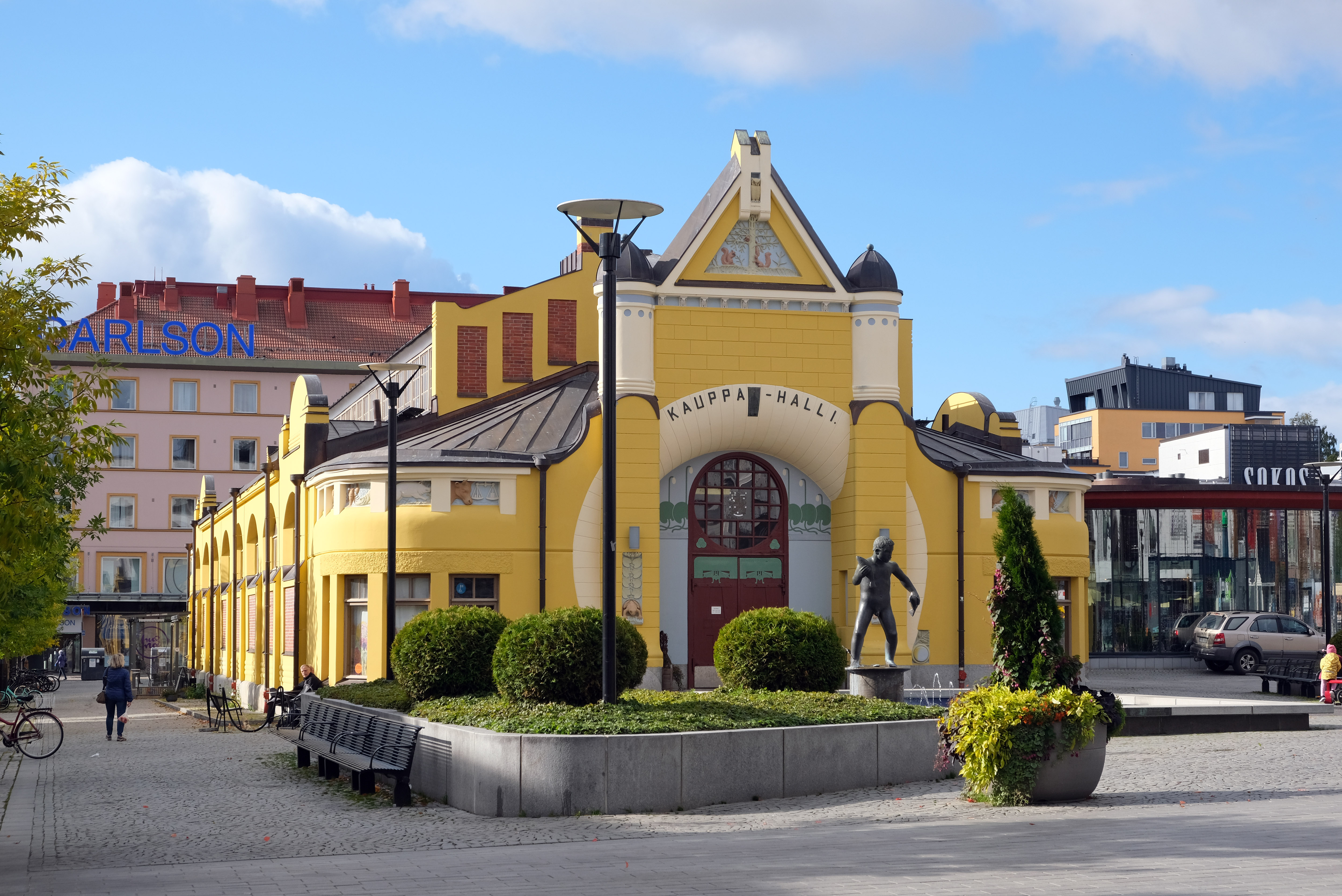
- The Kuopio Market Hall in 2020

General information
- Location: Multimäki, Kuopio, Finland, Kauppakatu 45
- Coordinates: 62°53′31″N 027°40′43″E
- Completed: 1902

Design and construction
- Architect: Johan Victor Strömberg

Kuopio Market Hall is an Art Nouveau-style market hall on Kuopio Market Square in the Multimäki district in Kuopio, Finland. The market hall has a sales point for 30 companies. It is open all year round six days a week.

== Services ==
The market is known for selling meat and traditional fish pies, named kalakukko, as well as handmade craft items. Apaja Shopping Center is underground, located below the market hall.

== History ==
The building was designed by Johan Victor Strömberg and the market hall began operations in August 1902. Prior to the construction of the market, the area served as horse stables. The hall was expanded in 1914 with a meat inspection center designed by Arne Sirelius, which now functions as a fish market. Later, the appearance of the hall has been improved and interior renovations have been made. The demolition of the market hall was last seriously discussed in the 1960s. However, it was decided to renovate the market hall in the early 1970s. The current coloring of the building dates from this period.

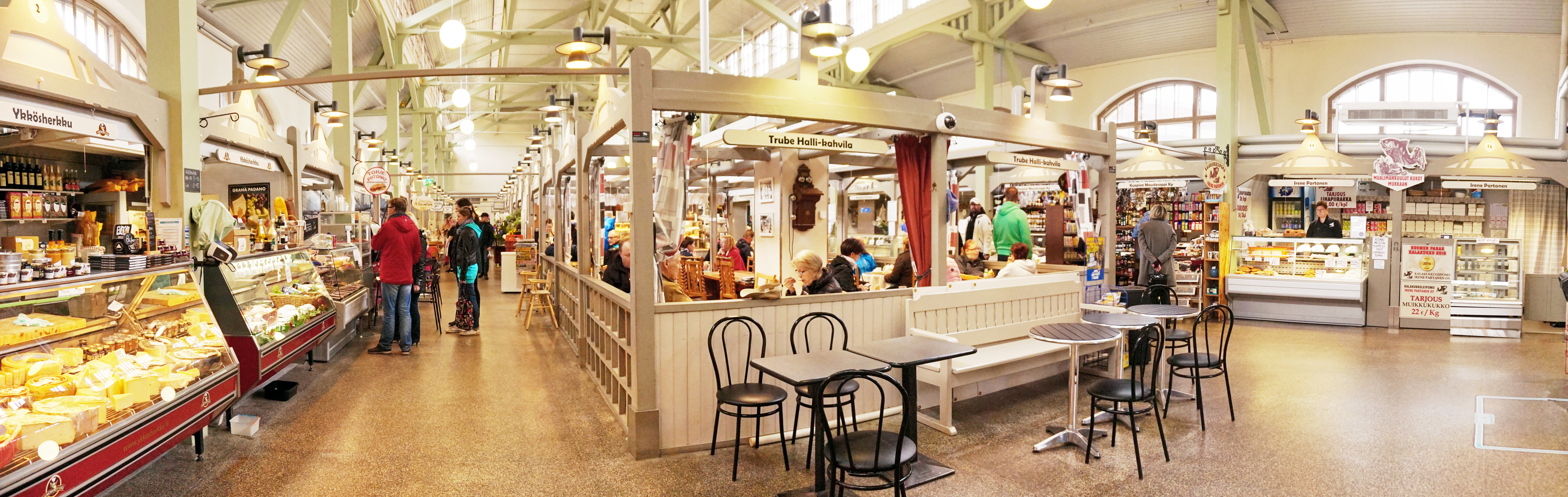
Interior of the Market Hall

The Market Hall project had been planned since the 1870s. The purity requirements for food sales had risen, and thus the need to build a permanent Point of Sale on the market also came to Kuopio. At the same time, the construction of a bazaar building was also planned for the square, but it was never carried out; also the market hall planned for the harbor square at the same time was never realized either.

There is a statue named "Veljmies" on the eastern side of the market hall, and a second statue named "Siskotyttö" on the western side of the market.

== See also ==
- Kauppakatu
- Oulu Market Hall
- Tampere Market Hall
- Turku Market Hall

== Sources ==
- Helena Riekki (2005). Kuopion kaupungin rakennushistoria - Kaupungin rakentamisvaiheita vuodesta 1875 (in Finnish). City of Kuopio. pp. 127–134. ISBN 951-842-293-1.
