= Kauppakatu =

Street in Kuopio, Finland

Coordinates: 62°53′30.152″N 027°40′47.996″E

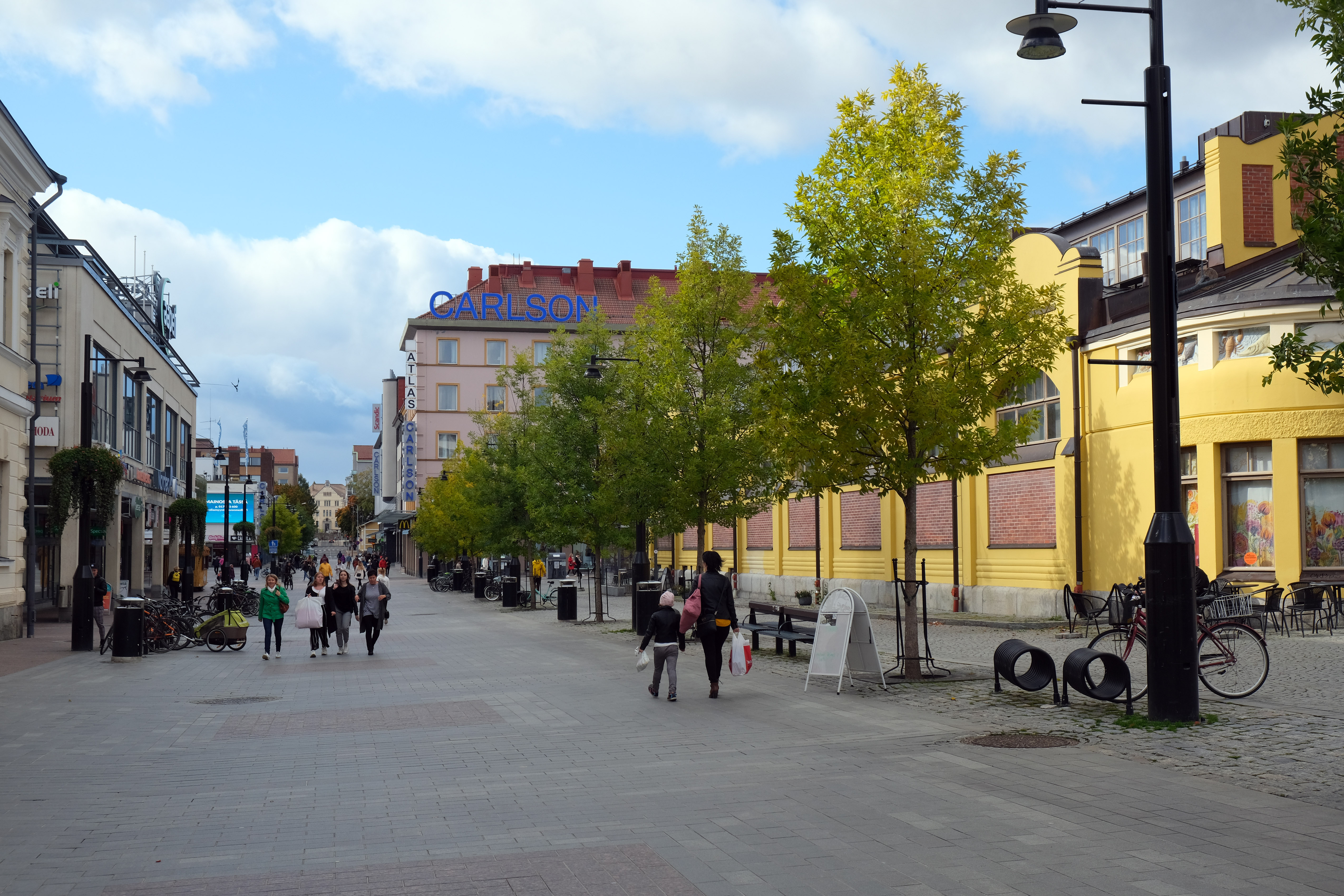
Kauppakatu in the city center near the Market Square

Kauppakatu (lit. "market street") is a street in the center of Kuopio in North Savo, Finland. The length of the street is about 1,500 meters. The street starts from Makasiinikatu from Kuopio Harbor and ends at Sairaalakatu. The street runs along the southern edge of Kuopio Market Square. Kauppakatu intersects with 19 streets and has ten traffic light-controlled intersections along it.

After the completion of the underground project, Kauppakatu will become a pedestrian street at the market square, between Vuorikatu and Ajurinkatu.

Most of the restaurants in the center of Kuopio are also located along Kauppakatu or in its immediate vicinity.

== See also ==
- Kuopio Market Hall
- Kuopio Market Square
- List of shopping streets and districts by city

== Sources ==
- Meijerin nurkalla. Kauppakadun lapset kertovat. Toimittaneet: Maija Metsämäki, Aila Huttunen ja Mikko Metsämäki. ISBN 978-952-9276257. (in Finnish)
