= Gustaf Nyström =

Finnish architect

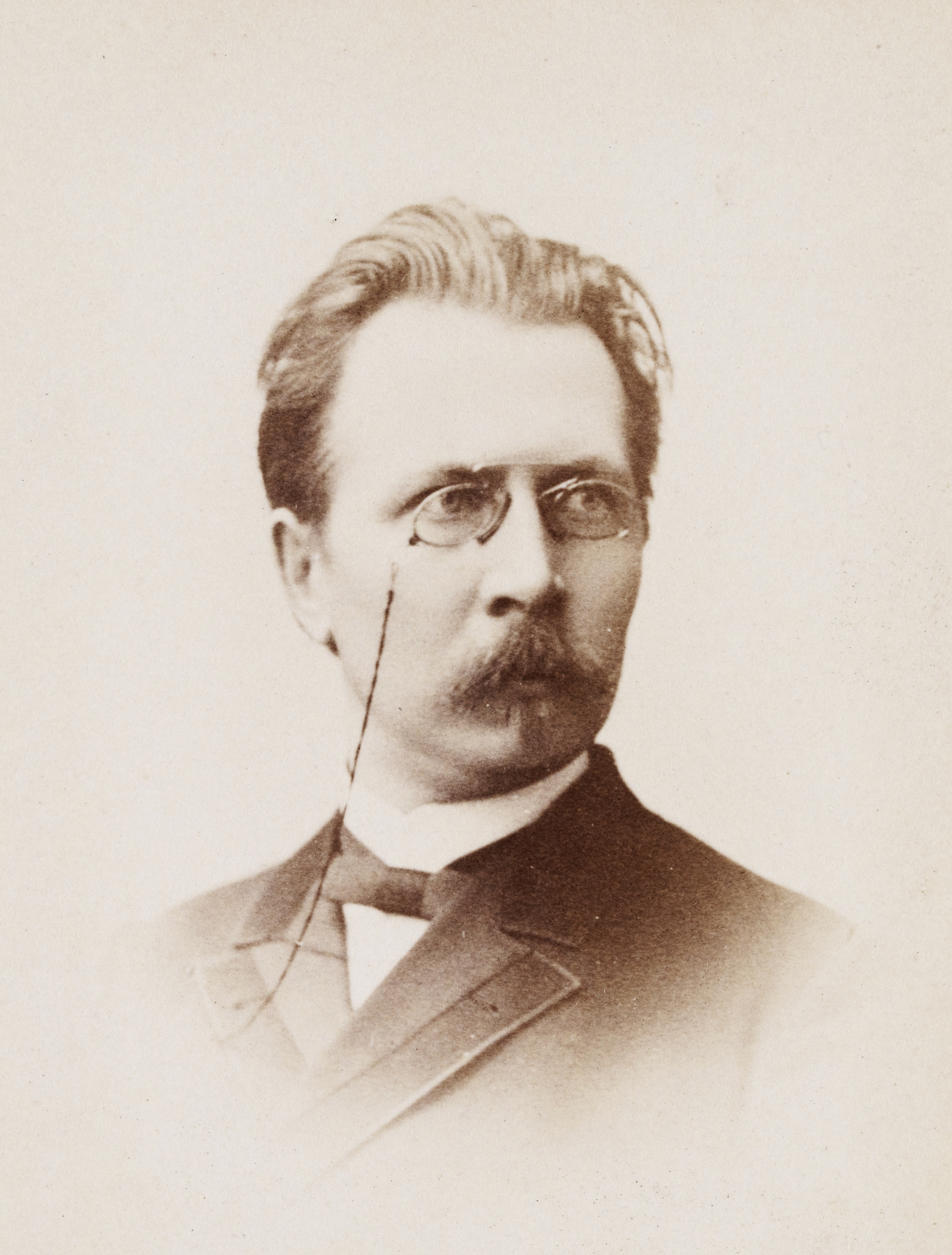
Gustaf Nyström

Gustaf Nyström (21 January 1856 – 30 December 1917) was a Finnish architect. Nyström has been described as one of the most important architects in Finland at the end of the 19th century and the beginning of the 20th century. He was active both as an influential teacher, as an architect in his own right, and as an official involved in groundbreaking urban planning projects.

== Life ==
Nyström studied architecture at the Polytechnical school (today Helsinki University of Technology) and graduated in 1876. He also spent a year studying in Vienna under Heinrich von Ferstel in 1878–79. He began work in the office of his former teacher, Frans Anatolius Sjöström, and took over Sjöström's firm in 1885. Already in 1879 he started teaching construction at the Polytechnical Institute (as it had then become) and in 1885 was named senior teacher of architecture. This position was later transformed into a professorship, and Nyström thus became the first professor of architecture in Finland. He was the principal of the institution between 1895 and 1917, and contributed to the transformation of the Polytechnical Institute into a University of Technology in 1908. The Imperial Academy of Arts in Saint Petersburg honoured him with the title of "academician" in 1892. He was also a member of a national archaeological commission and was a proponent of careful and scientific building conservation.

== Work ==
=== As a teacher ===
Nyström has been described as a "legendary teacher of architecture" and as the foremost teacher of architecture in Finland for around 40 years. During this time he developed the curriculum from a one-sided focus on artistic qualities (e.g. through practicing architectural drawing) to also include elements of engineering. He continued to teach in the Classical tradition but also emphasised the local Nordic and Finnish expressions of architecture. In this way, he became an influential teacher of architects working in the National Romantic style, which was to become very popular in Finland around the turn of the century, although he himself was less interested in the style. He has been described as a thorough and intellectual teacher.

=== As an architect ===
Nyström has also been described as one of the most important Finnish architects of his time. His first commissions were executed in a Neo-Renaissance style. He received prestigious commissions early, notably for the House of the Estates and the National Archives. These are executed in a traditional, representative form of Classicism, possibly in an effort to harmonize with other parts of the city centre of Helsinki which were already built in this style by Carl Ludvig Engel. He furthermore designed the earliest covered markets in Finland, in Helsinki (1888) and Turku (1896). From approximately the same time are the greenhouse of the botanical garden of the University of Helsinki and the winter garden of Helsinki city park; both are examples of the novel use of wrought iron and glass in architecture. Nyström furthermore designed several buildings for the university and other public commissions, e.g. harbour storage buildings and hospitals.

Nyström has been described as the last architect in Finland who was truly distinguished as a Neo-Renaissance architect. From circa 1900 onward Nyström began to also experiment in other styles. Influences can be seen from Art Nouveau but also from National Romanticism. He knew about the developments in architecture made by Otto Wagner in Vienna.

As an architect Nyström was also involved in urban planning projects. He was one of the main contributors to the city plans of Kallio and Töölö and acted as a forerunner, incorporating new ideas into the city plans. He was furthermore active as a local politician and in that capacity involved in social housing projects.

Nyström was a conscientious architect who paid much attention to detail. Throughout his life he retained close contacts with the architectural scene in the other Nordic countries and notably also with that of Austria.

== Gallery ==
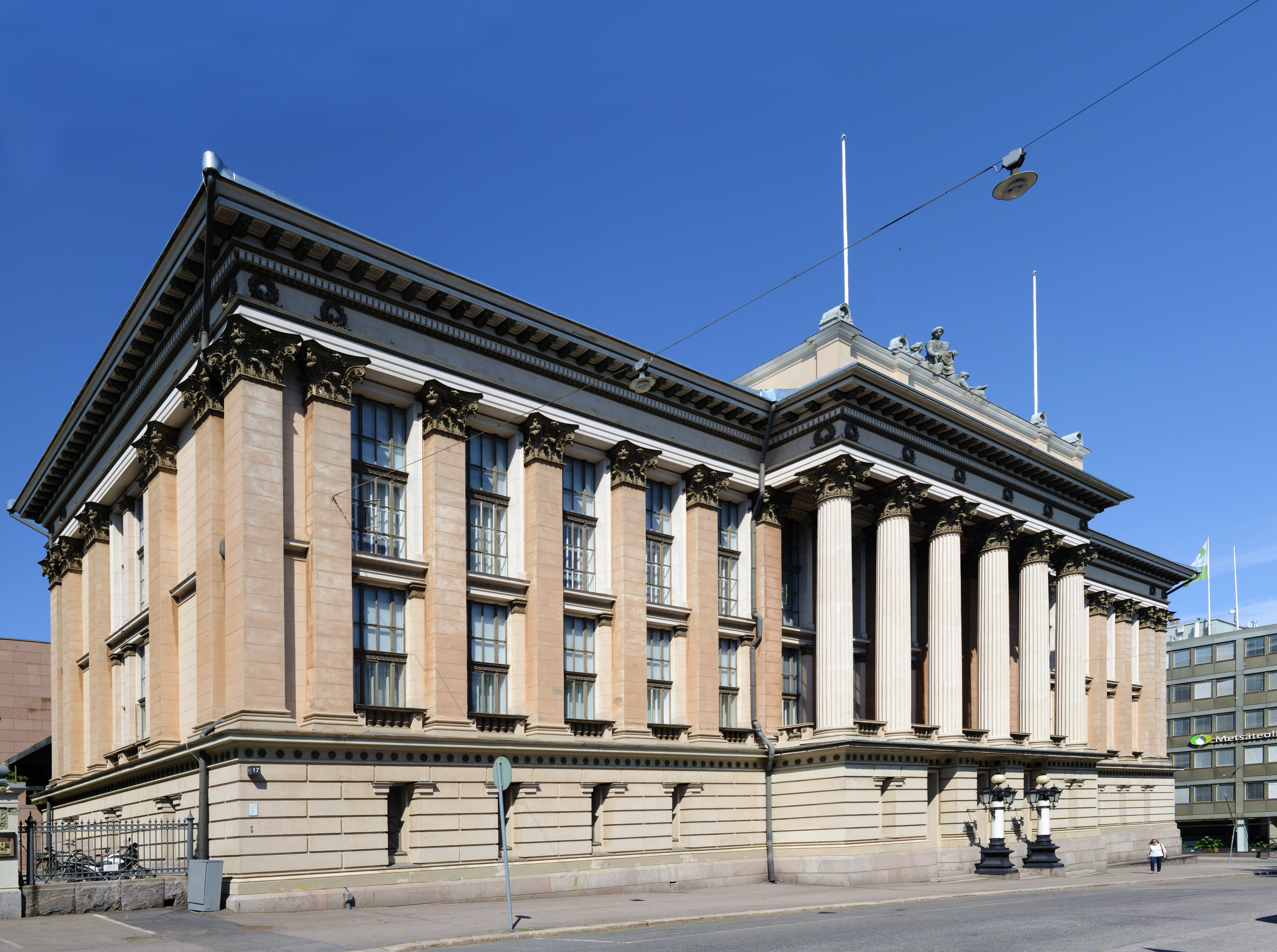
National Archives of Finland (1885–1890)

House of the Estates (1886–1891)

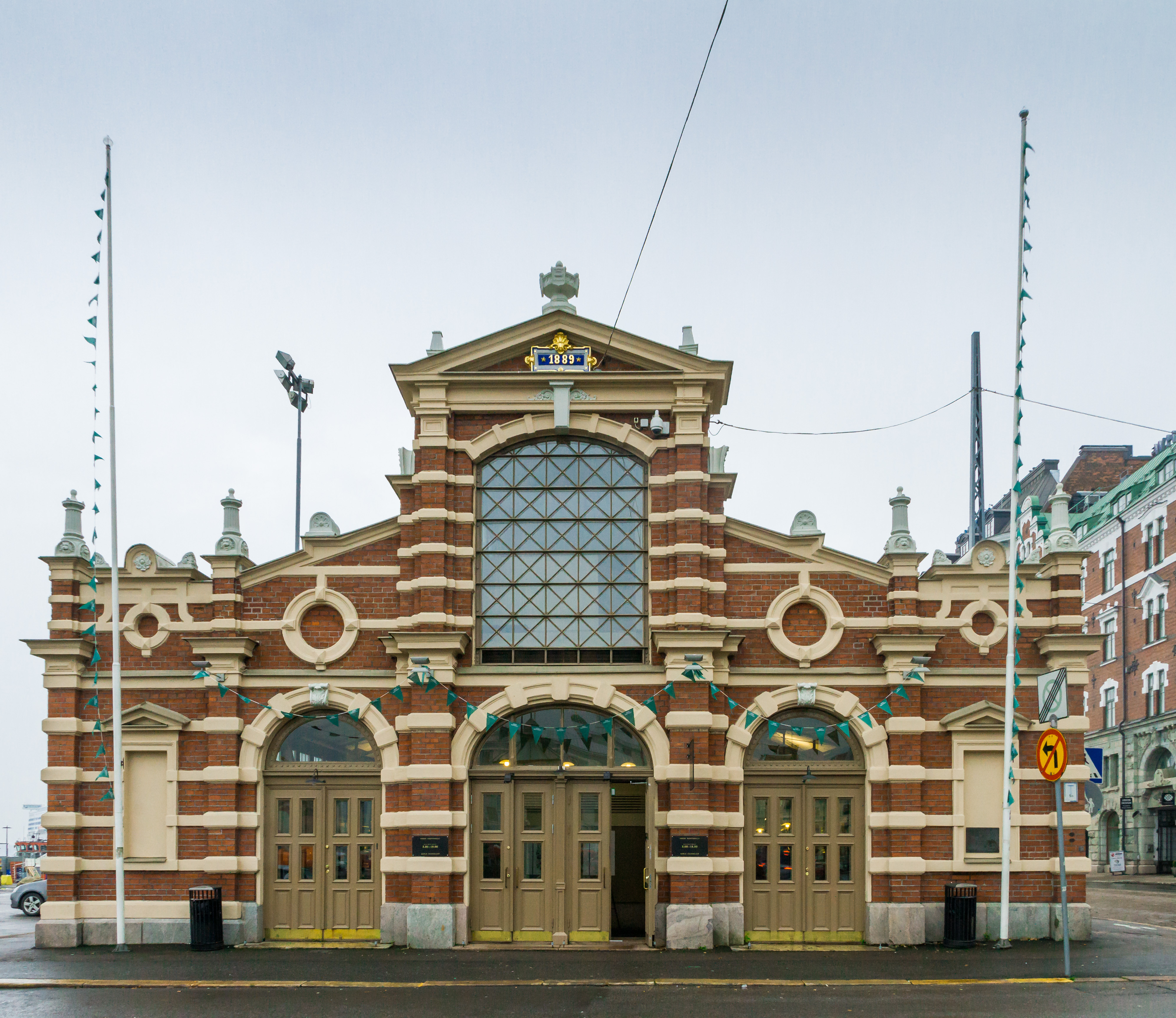
Old Market Hall in Helsinki (1888–1889 and 1900)

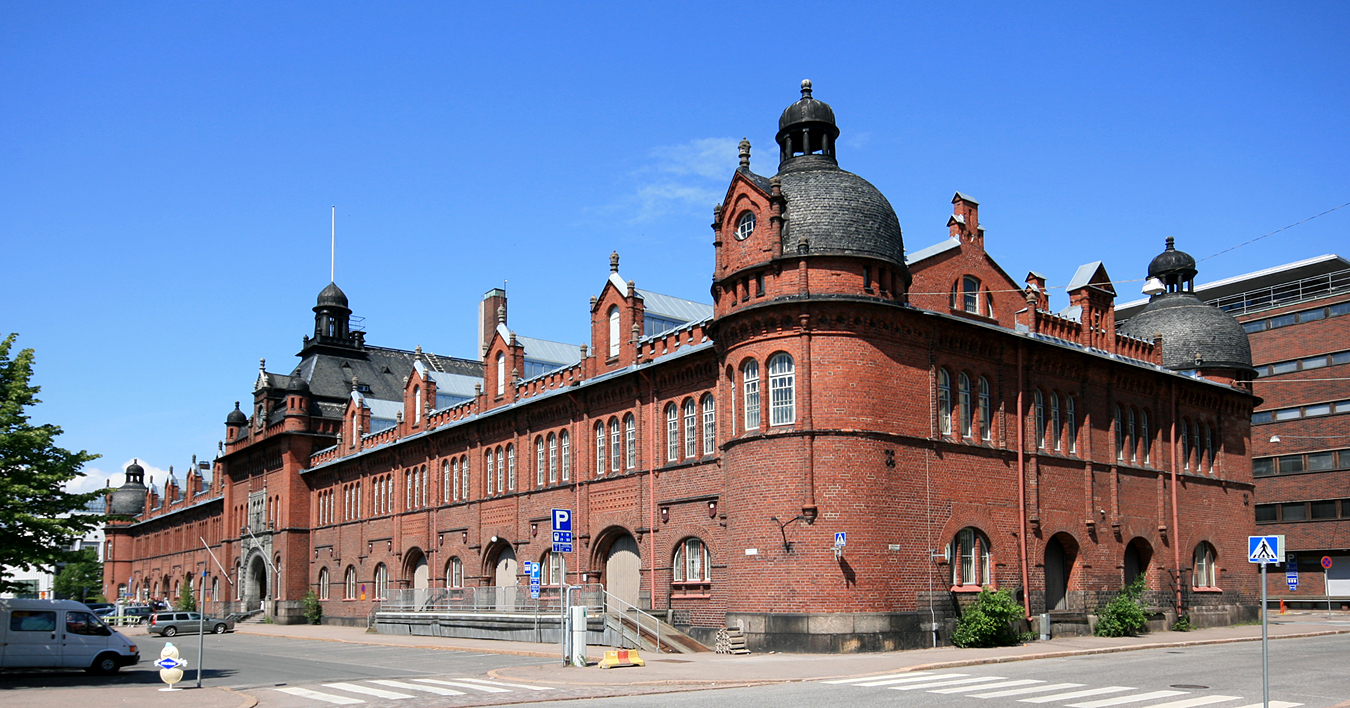
Customs and warehouse, Helsinki (1897–1900)

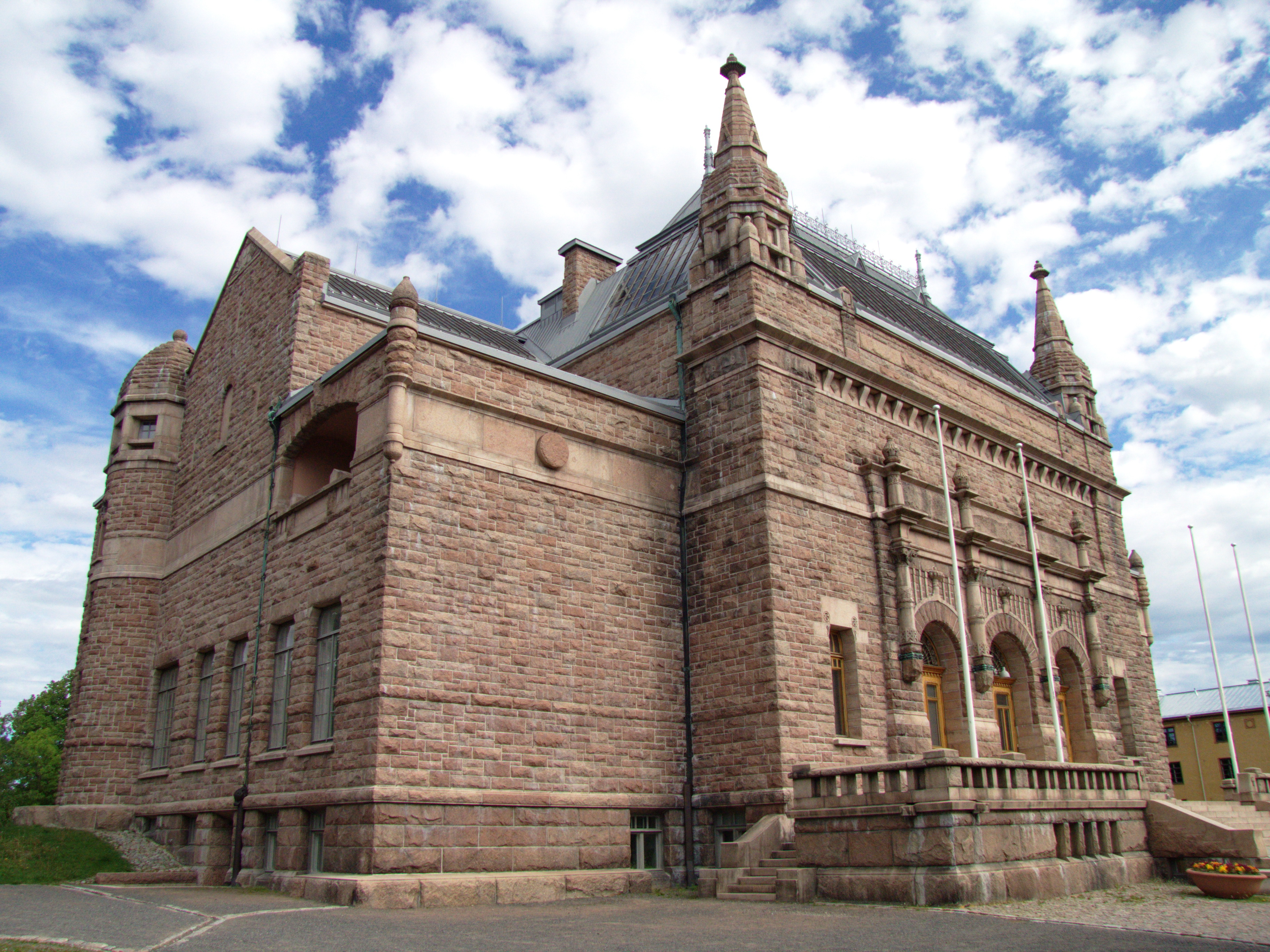
Turku Art Museum (1900–1904)

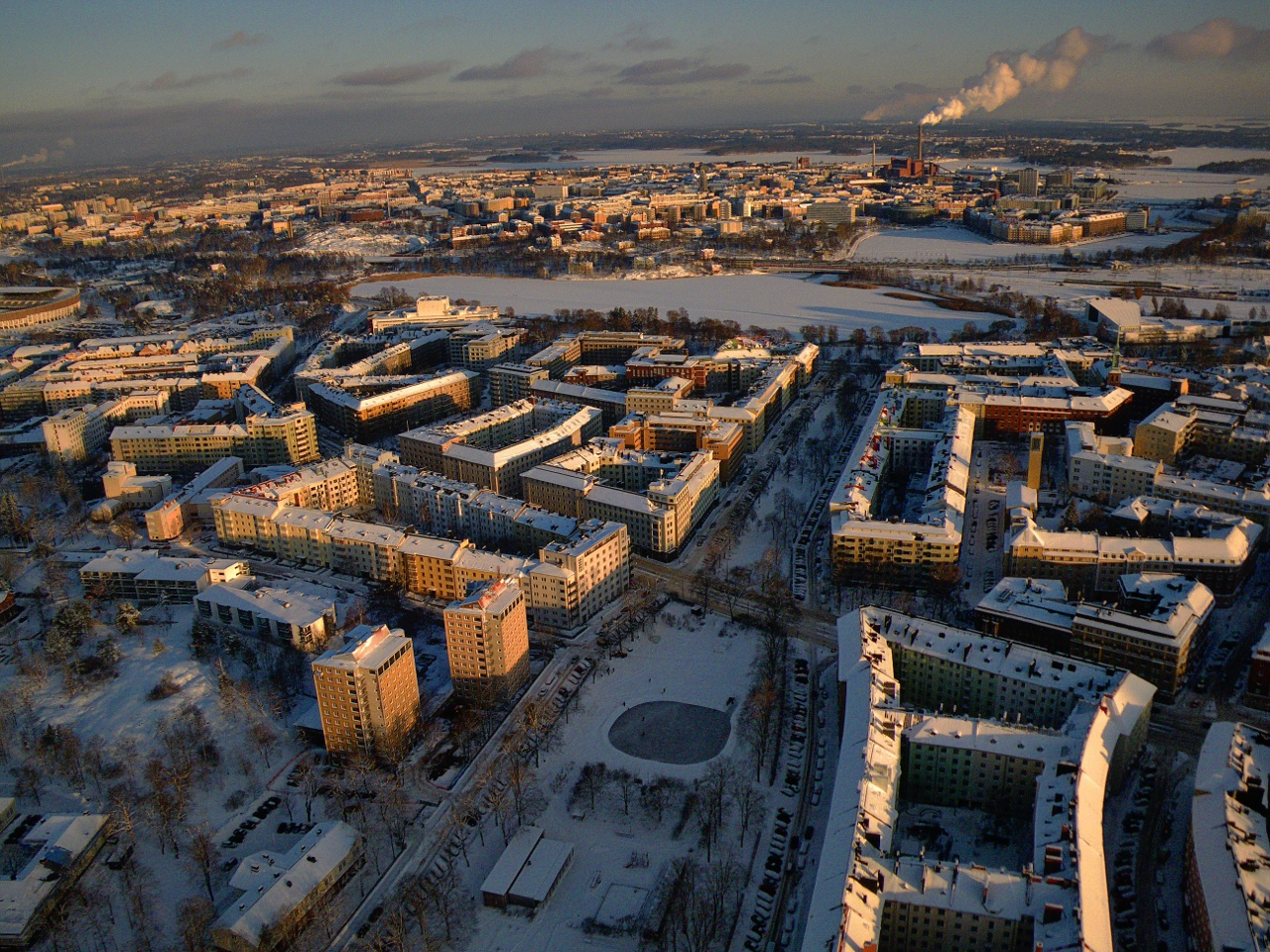
Töölö neighbourhood (city plan, 1898–1902)

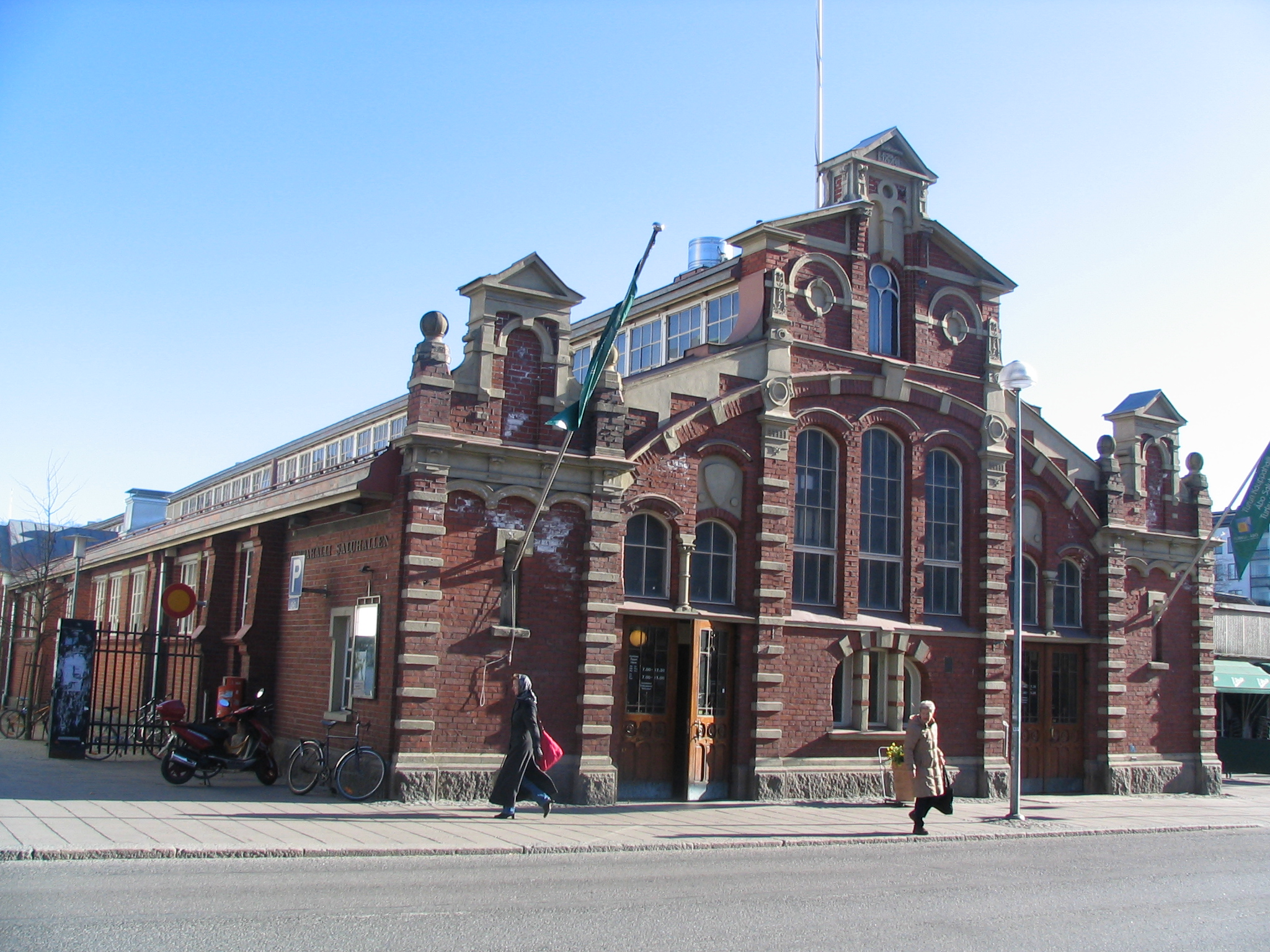
Turku Market Hall (1896)

== See also ==
- Suomen Yhdyspankki
