= Multimäki =

City district in Kuopio, Finland

Coordinates: 62°53′35″N 27°40′37″E

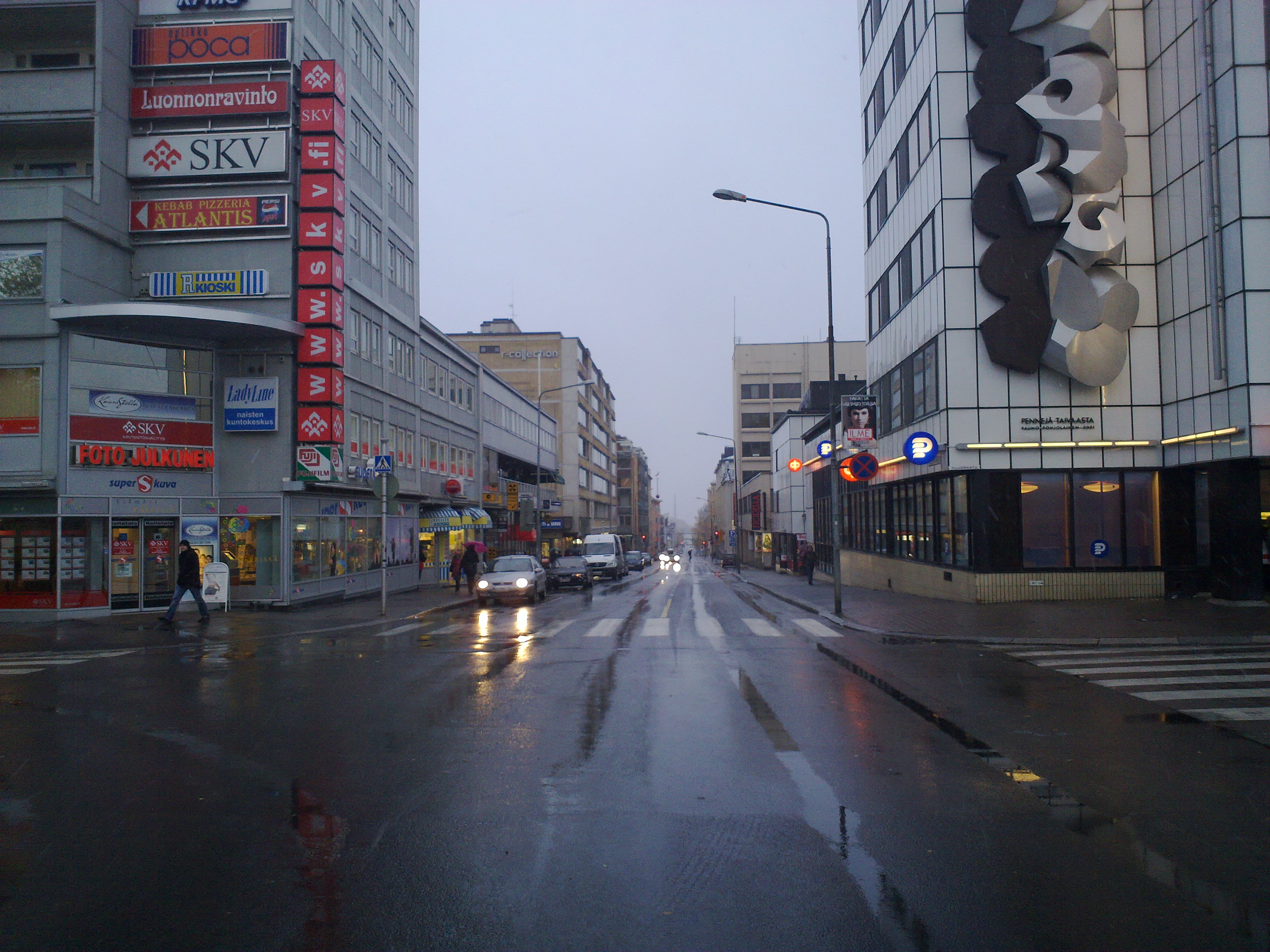
Puijonkatu street in Multimäki

Multimäki is a central district in the heart of Kuopio, Finland. Many of Kuopio's most significant attractions, including the Kuopio's Market Square and Market Hall, Heroes' Park (also known as Hatsala Cemetery) and the Kuopio City Hall, are located in the district. Kuopio Lyceum High School and two kindergartens also operate in the district. Multimäki borders district of Maljalahti in the north, Vahtivuori in the east, Kuopionlahti in the south, and Hatsala in the west. The boundaries of the district are street Minna Canthin katu (named after Minna Canth) in the south, Vuorikatu in the east, Suokatu in the north and Puistokatu in the west.

The name Multimäki is not very commonly used, but this district name appears mainly in zoning. It is common to talk about the city center, which in addition to Multimäki includes the Väinölänniemi, Vahtivuori, Hatsala, Maljalahti and Kuopionlahti districts.

== See also ==
- IsoCee
- Minna Shopping Center
