= Kuopio Market Square =

Square in Kuopio, Finland

Coordinates: 62°53′32″N 027°40′42″E

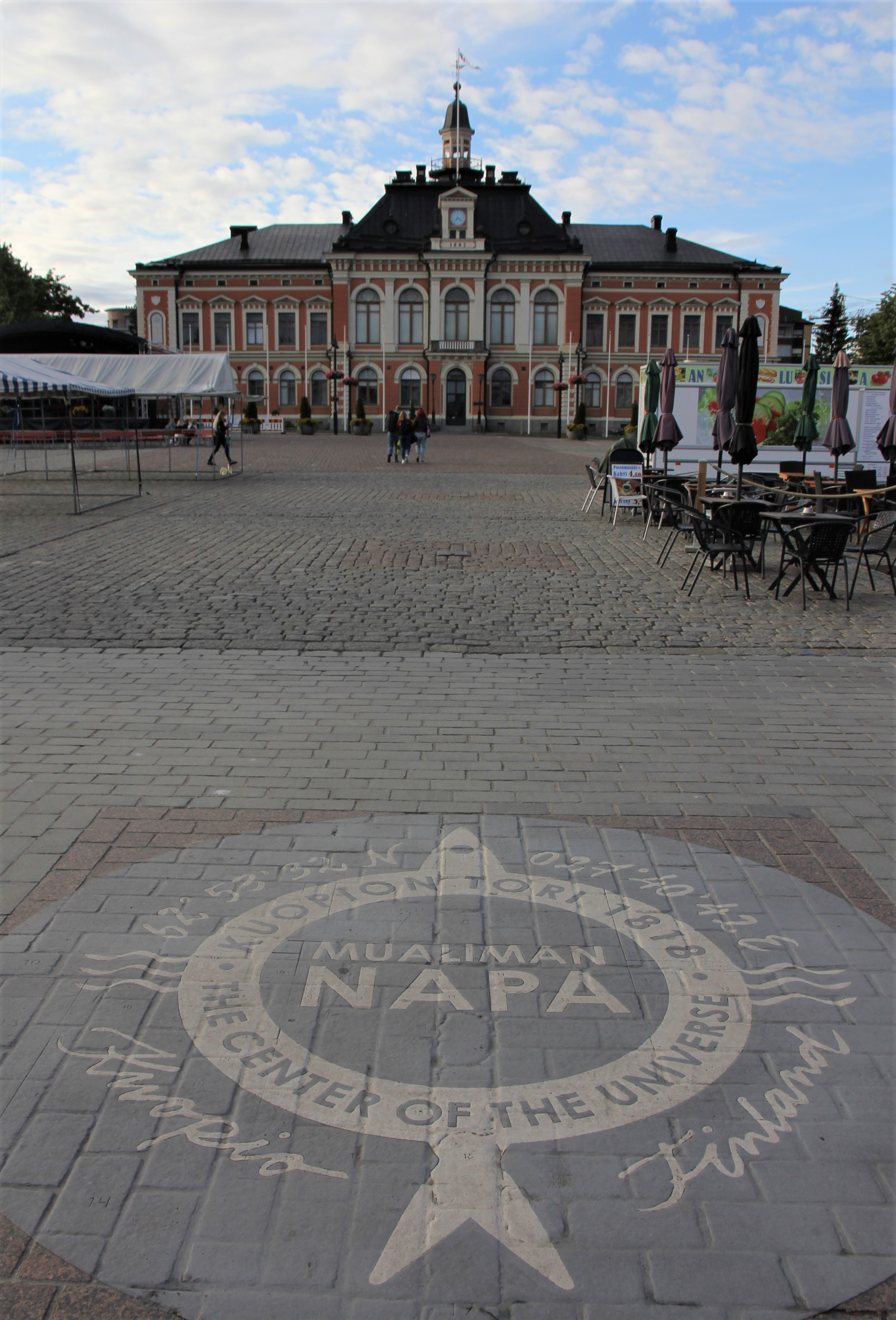
The Market Square, the "centre of the universe", viewed front of the Kuopio Town Hall.

Kuopio Market Square (Finnish: Kuopion kauppatori) is the market square in the Multimäki district in Kuopio, North Savo, Finland. The market is located about one hundred meters above sea level and the size of the area is 130×174 meters. The cover is made of dice and nubile stone. In the east–west direction, the area is crossed by flat walkways. As a surface, the market is slightly sloping, which poses challenges for use. The structure rests on a 10–15 m deep sand mattress, under which there is a ridge formation starting from Väinölänniemi, which runs under the church towards Puijo. Tulliportinkatu runs along the edges of the square in the north, Puijonkatu in the east, Kauppakatu in the south and Haapaniemenkatu in the west.

The locals use the nickname Mualiman napa in the square, which more freely translates to mean "the centre of the universe". (Note: Mualima is a Savonian dialect of the Finnish word maailma, which also means "world".)

== History ==
In 1775, surveyor Pehr Kjellman was commissioned to draw up a town plan for the city after King Gustav III had designated the then Kuopio's church village as the capital of the Savonia and Karelia provinces, which he had founded in the same year. Already the following year the formula was ready, and the king approved it immediately. The center of Kjellman's town plan was the Great Market, which was named the Gustav Market (Kustaantori) a few years later after the city's founder. Earlier than this, the market square founded by Per Brahe the Younger was located in the town plan on the shores of what is now Kuopio Bay. That is why the area is now called Brahe Park (Brahenpuisto) and the edge of the park runs through Brahenkatu. In its current location, the market has been located in its current location since 1818. It became a market square in 1856, when the market store moved to this location from the site of the former Gustav Market, now Snellman Park (Snellmaninpuisto), named after J. V. Snellman.

== See also ==
- List of city squares

=== Other notable places in Kuopio ===
- Kauppakatu
- Kuopio City Hall
- Kuopio Market Hall
- Lake Kallavesi
- Puijo Hill
