= Keva (pension agency) =

Finnish pension institution

Keva is the Finnish pension agency responsible for pensions of public sector workers in state, municipal, and state church positions. Keva is responsible for the pensions of 1.3 million workers, and has €35.8 billion in investments. The corporation is defined separately in the Municipal Pensions Act 13.6.2003/549.

The name Keva derives from Kuntien eläkevakuutus, "Pension Insurance of the Municipalities".

Keva covers a total of 1.2 million public sector employees and retirees. In 2017, revenue from contributions to the Keva pension scheme was around €4.8 billion and the market value of investments was around €51.9 billion.

== Operations ==
Keva takes care of pension matters for personnel of the municipal sector, the state, the church and Kela. The pension provision of employees in these public sectors is laid down in the Public Sector Pensions Act. It is currently the only pension insurer in Finland falling within the scope of the Act on the Openness of Government Activities. Keva is responsible for financing the pensions of municipal sector personnel and for investing pension assets. The pensions are financed with contributions collected from municipal sector employers and employees.

In 2021, Keva had approximately 1,970 employer customers. Out of these, 1,110 were municipal sector organisations, 584 were state employers and 271 were parishes or parish unions. Kela and the Bank of Finland are also among its employer customers. Earnings-related pension services were provided to approximately 1.3 million public sector employees and pension recipients. In 2021, contribution income paid by Keva's member organisations amounted to EUR 5,489 million, while the total pension expenditure of Keva's member organisations was EUR 5,915 million. Keva issued a total of 66,319 decisions, of which 58,489 concerned pension matters, 7,540 were rehabilitation decisions and the rest were, for example, benefit decisions concerning financial support.

In addition, Keva publishes statistics on, among other things, pension forecasts for municipal sector and state employees, the number of disability pensions and well-being at work in the public sector.

== Investments ==
The value of Keva's investments at the end of 2021 was EUR 66.8 billion. Keva has investments in fixed income, equity, real estate, private equity and hedge fund investments. Keva's equity portfolio is diversified across the world.

At the end of 2021, the breakdown of the market value of Keva's investment assets was:

- fixed income investments 35.8 %,
- listed equities 35.8 %,
- private equity investments 16 %,
- hedge fund investments 6.4 %, and
- real estate 6 %

=== Real estate ===
Keva is one of the largest providers of business premises in Finland. It has rental apartments and business premises in 130 properties, particularly in the Helsinki metropolitan area and in growth centres in Finland. One third of the properties were offices, 27 per cent apartments, almost one quarter retail premises and one tenth hotels. The market value of the properties at the end of 2021 was approximately EUR 2.9 billion.

Properties owned by Keva include, among others:

- the Gasellikortteli property complex and the Stockmann department store in the heart of central Helsinki
- the HTC Vega and Santa Maria buildings in Ruoholahti, Helsinki
- apartments, offices and the properties of the Turku Conservatory and the Arts Academy on the Länsiranta area in Turku
- Sokos Hotel Ilves, Sokos Hotel Vantaa and Sokos Hotel Vaakuna Rovaniemi.

Additionally, Keva's retail premises include the Sello shopping centre, of which it owns half.
