= Market hall =

Covered space used as a marketplace

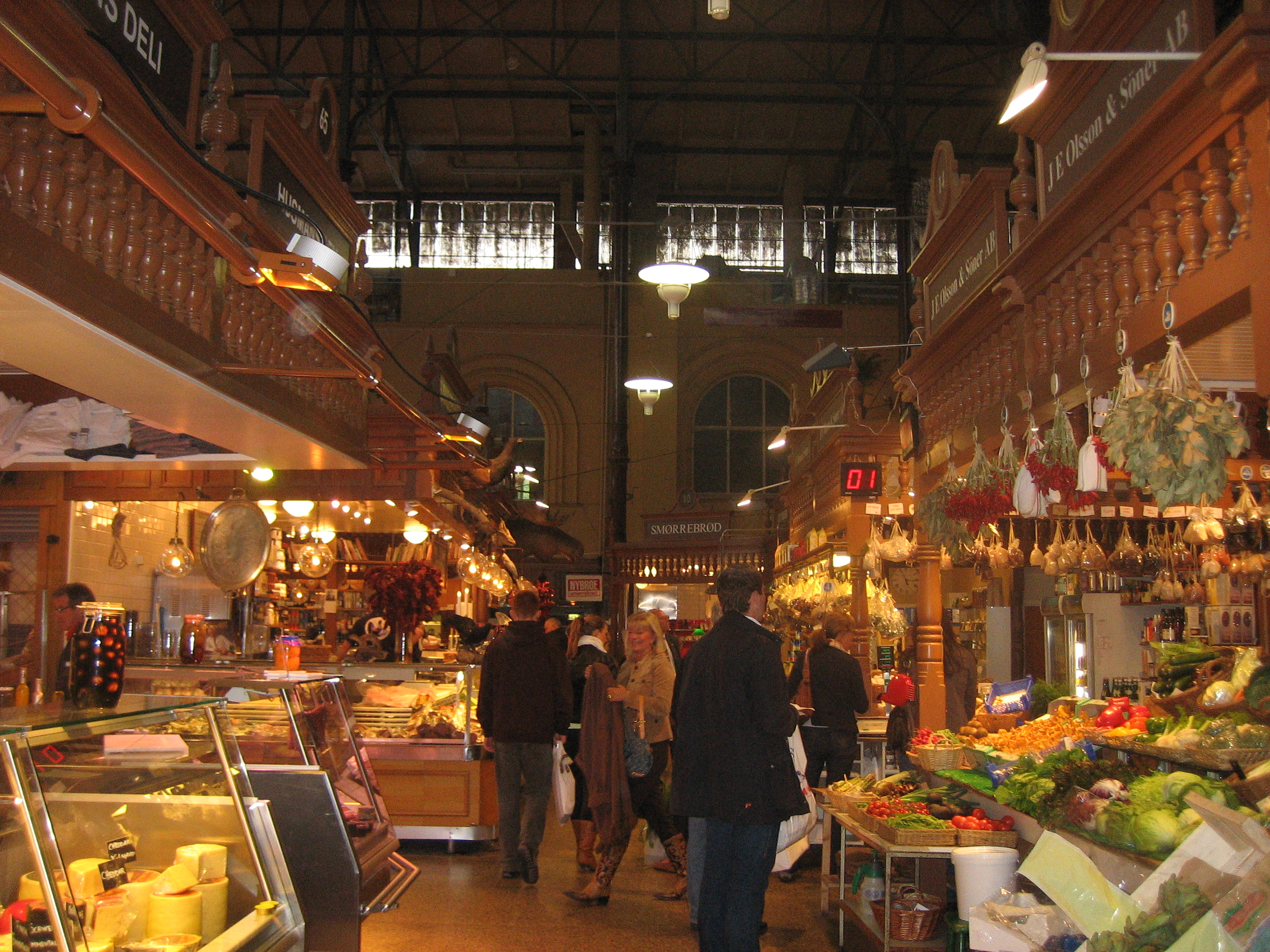
Östermalms Saluhall, Stockholm, Sweden

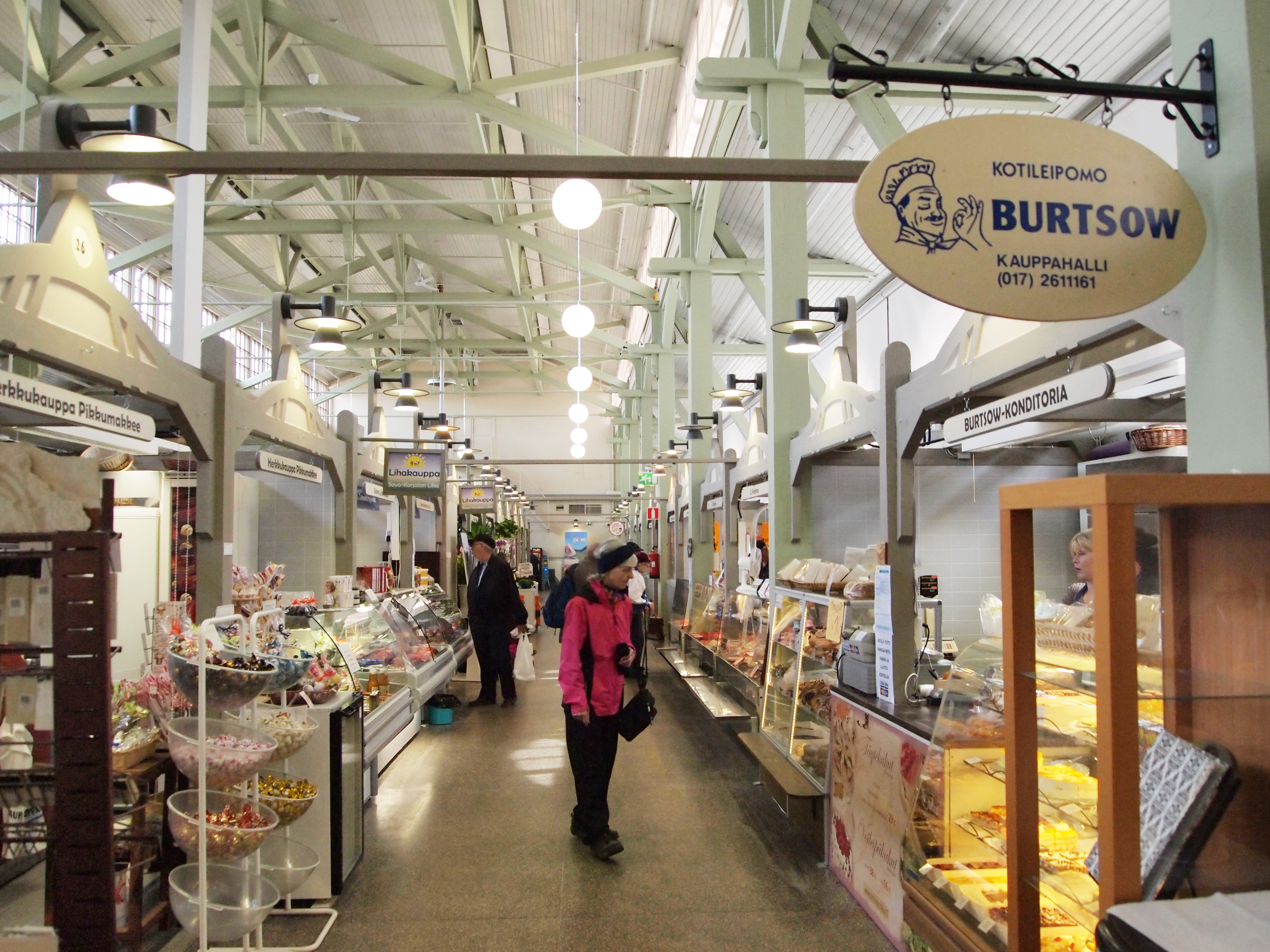
Interior of the Kuopio Market Hall, Kuopio, Finland

A market hall is a covered space or a building where food and other articles are sold from stalls by independent vendors. A market hall is a type of indoor market and can be found in many European countries. The most common variation of a market hall is a food hall, an area of a department store where food is sold.

Market halls and food halls can also be unconnected to department stores and operate independently, often in a separate building. A modern market hall may also exist in the form of what is nominally a gourmet food hall or a public market, for example in Stockholm's Östermalm Saluhall or Mexico City's Mercado Roma.

Unlike shopping mall food courts made up of fast food chains, food halls typically mix local artisan restaurants, butcher shops and other food-oriented boutiques under one roof. The term food hall in the British sense, meaning an equivalent of a market hall, is increasingly used in the United States. In some Asia-Pacific countries, a food hall is equivalent to a North American food court, or the terms are used interchangeably.

== See also ==
- Pannier market
- Cloth hall
- Marketplace
- Hawker centre
