= Boldt =

Boldt may refer to:

- Alwin Boldt (1884–1920), German Olympic cyclist
- Carl Boldt (1932–2015), American basketball player
- David Boldt (1918–2007)
- Georg Boldt (1862–1918), Finnish philosopher of religion
- George Boldt (1851–1916), Prussian-born entrepreneur
- George Hugo Boldt (1903–1984), United States federal judge
- Gerhard Boldt (1918–1981), German officer and author
- Harry Boldt (born 1930), German dressage competitor
- Herman E. Boldt (1865–1941), member of Wisconsin senate
- Elihu Boldt (1931-2008), American astrophysicist
- Jean Boldt (1865–1920), Finnish theosophist and anarchist
- Joachim Boldt (born 1954), author of fraudulent medical research
- Marius Boldt (born 1989), Norwegian footballer
- Paul Boldt (1885–1921), German poet
- Ryan Boldt (born 1994), American baseball player
- Ryan Boldt, Canadian musician
- Sidney Boldt-Christmas (born 1924), Swedish sailor

== See also ==
- Boldt Decision
- Boldt Castle
- George C. Boldt Yacht House
- Boldt Hall
