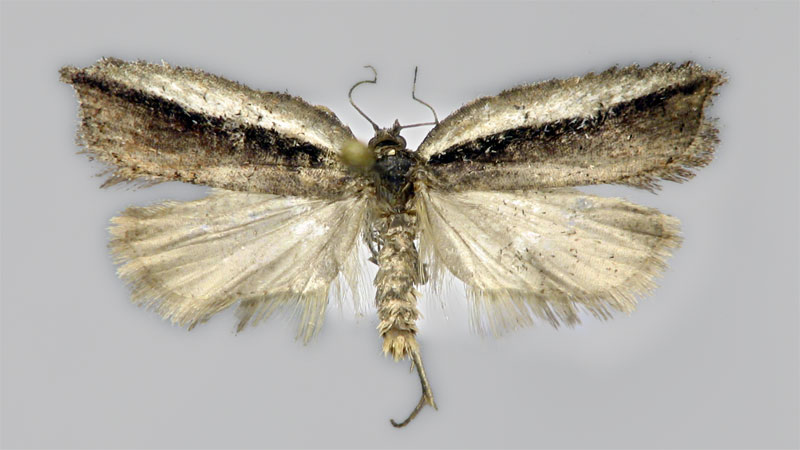

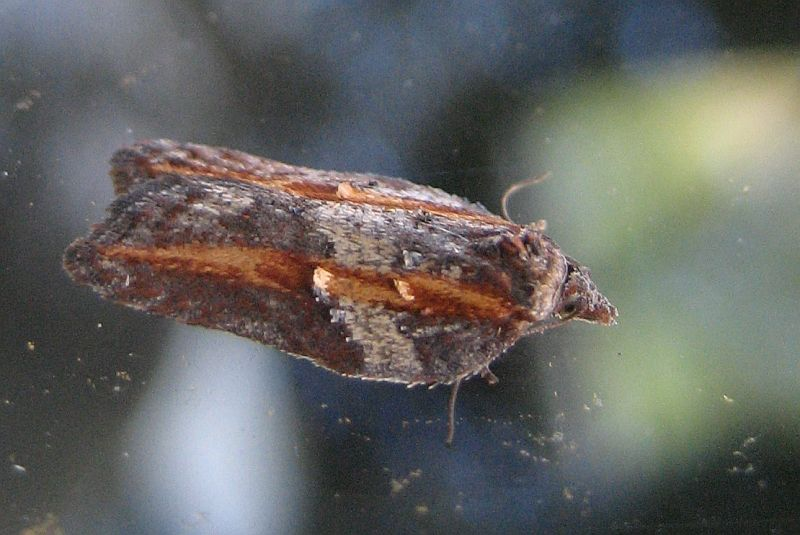

Scientific classification
- Kingdom: Animalia
- Phylum: Arthropoda
- Class: Insecta
- Order: Lepidoptera
- Family: Tortricidae
- Genus: Acleris
- Species: A. hastiana

Binomial name
- Acleris hastiana (Linnaeus, 1758)

Synonyms
- Phalaena (Tortrix) hastiana Linnaeus, 1758; Peronea hastiana ab. albana Sheldon, 1923; Peronea hastiana f. albicapitana Sheldon, 1930; Peronea hastiana f. albicostana Sheldon, 1930; Peronea hastiana ab. albimaculana Sheldon, 1923; Peronea hastiana ab. albisparsana Sheldon, 1923; Tortrix albistriana Haworth, [1811]; Peronea hastiana ab. albostriana Sheldon, 1923; Peronea hastiana ab. albovittana Sheldon, 1923; Peronea hastiana f. apiciana Sheldon, 1930; Acalla hastiana var. apicivitta Muller-Rutz, 1924; Tortrix aquilana Hubner, [1811-1813]; Peronea hastiana ab. argentana Sheldon, 1930; Peronea hastiana ab. argenteostrigana Sheldon, 1930; Acalla hastiana ab. atra Dufrane, 1933; Tortrix autumnana Hubner, [1814-1817]; Teras basilinea Fettig, 1882; Acalla hastiana ab. bentincki Dufrane, 1933; Acalla hastiana var. bicoloria Muller-Rutz, 1924; Peronea hastiana ab. bivittana Sheldon, 1923; Tortrix blomiana Thunberg, 1797; Eclectis bollingerana Hubner, [1825] 1816; Pyralis borana Fabricius, 1787; Peronea hastiana ab. brevivittana Sheldon, 1923; Acalla hastiana var. brunnea Muller-Rutz, 1924; Peronea hastiana ab. brunneana Sheldon, 1923; Peronea hastiana ab. brunneoradiana Sheldon, 1923; Peronea hastiana ab. brunneostriana Sheldon, 1923; Acalla hastiana f. brunnescens Muller-Rutz, 1924; Phalaena (Tortrix) byringerana Hubner, 1793; Peronea centrovittana Stephens, 1929; Peronea centrovittana Stephens, 1834; Tortrix combustana Hubner, [1811-1813]; Acalla hastiana ab. confusa Muller-Rutz, 1924; Acalla coronana Thunberg & Borgstrm, 1784; Acalla hastiana var. costimacula Muller-Rutz, 1924; Acalla hastiana ab. cuprea Muller-Rutz, 1924; Tortrix divisana Hubner, [1811-1813]; Tortrix eximiana Haworth, [1811]; Acalla hastiana var. fasciana Muller-Rutz, 1924; Peronea hastiana ab. fasciana Sheldon, 1923; Acalla hastiana ab. ferruginea Dufrane, 1933; Peronea hastiana ab. flavana Sheldon, 1923; Peronea hastiana ab. flavicapitana Sheldon, 1923; Peronea hastiana ab. flavicostana Sheldon, 1923; Acalla hippophaeana f. flavidorsana Turati, 1921; Peronea hastiana ab. fulvovittana Sheldon, 1923; Tortrix furvana Zincken, in Charpentier, 1821; Acalla hastiana ab. grisea Dufrane, 1933; Acalla grisea Muller-Rutz, 1924; Peronea hastiana ab. griseana Sheldon, 1923; Peronea hastiana ab. griseofasciana Sheldon, 1923; Peronea hastiana ab. griseovittana Sheldon, 1923; Acleris hastina Byun & Yan, 2004; Acalla hastiana ab. hubneri Dufrane, 1933; Acalla hastiana ab. impura Dufrane, 1933; Peronea hastiana ab. irrorana Sheldon, 1923; Acalla hastiana ab. joannisi Dufrane, 1933; Acalla hastiana ab. latofasciana Dufrane, 1933; Peronea leachana Curtis, 1834; Acalla hastiana ab. lemvigana Larsen, 1916; Tortrix leprosana Frolich, 1828; Peronea leucophaeana Humphreys & Westwood, 1845; Pyralis liberana Fabricius, 1798; Acalla longepartitana Bruand, 1850; Peronea hastiana ab. maculostriana Sheldon, 1923; Tortrix mayrana Geyer, in Hubner, [1832-1833]; Peronea hastiana ab. metallicana Sheldon, 1923; Acalla hastiana ab. mixta Muller-Rutz, 1924; Peronea hastiana ab. mixtana Sheldon, 1923; Peronea hastiana ab. nigrana Sheldon, 1923; Acalla hastiana ab. nigrobasis Muller-Rutz, 1924; Peronea hastiana ab. nigrodivisana Sheldon, 1923; Peronea hastiana ab. nigrostriana Sheldon, 1923; Peronea hastiana f. nigrostrigana Sheldon, 1930; Peronea hastiana f. nigrovittana Sheldon, 1930; Acalla hastiana f. obscura Muller-Rutz, 1924; Peronea obsoletana Stephens, 1834; Peronea hastiana ab. ochreofasciana Sheldon, 1923; Peronea hastiana ab. ochreovittana Sheldon, 1923; Acalla hastiana f. olivacea Muller-Rutz, 1924; Teras pastiana Murtfeldt, 1893; Peronea hastiana ab. plumbeana Sheldon, 1923; Peronea hastiana f. plumbeofasciana Sheldon, 1930; Peronea hastiana f. plumbeostriana Sheldon, 1930; Peronea hastiana ab. postmaculana Curtis, 1938; Acalla hastiana ab. pruinosana Rebel, in Staudinger & Wocke, 1901; Acleris hastiana ab. pseudoconfixana Obraztsov, 1956; Teras umbranum ab. pseudologiana Reutti, 1898; Teras pulverosana Walker, 1863; Tortrix radiana Hubner, [1796-1799]; Acalla hastiana var. radiana Muller-Rutz, 1924; Peronea ramostriana Stephens, 1829; Peronea ramostriana Stephens, 1834; Peronea hastiana ab. rufifasciana Sheldon, 1923; Peronea hastiana ab. rufimaculana Sheldon, 1923; Peronea hastiana ab. rufimixtana Sheldon, 1923; Peronea hastiana f. rufistrigana Sheldon, 1930; Peronea hastiana ab. rufivittana Sheldon, 1923; Acalla hastiana ab. ruginea Dufrane, 1933; Peronea hastiana f. sagittana Sheldon, 1930; Peronea hastiana ab. scoticana Sheldon, 1923; Peronea hastiana ab. sheldonana Metcalfe, 1928; Teras sparsana var. signana Tengstrom, 1848; Tortrix stickmanniana Thunberg, 1797; Peronea hastiana ab. striana Sheldon, 1923; Peronea hastiana ab. subdivisana Sheldon, 1923; Peronea hastiana ab. subfasciana Sheldon, 1923; Acalla hastiana ab. subferruginea Dufrane, 1933; Acleris hastiana ab. subgrisea Obraztsov, 1957; Peronea hastiana ab. subhastiana Sheldon, 1923; Peronea hastiana ab. subradiana Sheldon, 1923; Peronea hastiana ab. subscabrana Sheldon, 1923; Peronea hastiana ab. substriana Sheldon, 1923; Peronea hastiana ab. subvittana Sheldon, 1923; Peronea hastiana f. transapiciana Sheldon, 1930; Peronea hastiana ab. transversana Sheldon, 1923; Tortrix tristana Hubner, [1796-1799]; Peronea hastiana ab. trivittana Sheldon, 1923; Acalla hastiana f. unicolor Muller-Rutz, 1924; Acalla hastiana ab. uniformata Dufrane, 1933; Peronea hastiana f. ustomaculana Sheldon, 1930; Peronea hastiana ab. ustulana Sheldon, 1923; Peronea hastiana ab. variegana Sheldon, 1923; Teleia veterana Hubner, [1825]

= Acleris hastiana =

Species of moth

Acleris hastiana is a moth of the family Tortricidae. It is found in Europe, northern Iran, Kazakhstan, Ala Tau, central Siberia, Irkutsk, the Amur region and China. In North America it is found from the north-eastern United States across southern Canada to British Columbia and south along the Pacific Coast to California.

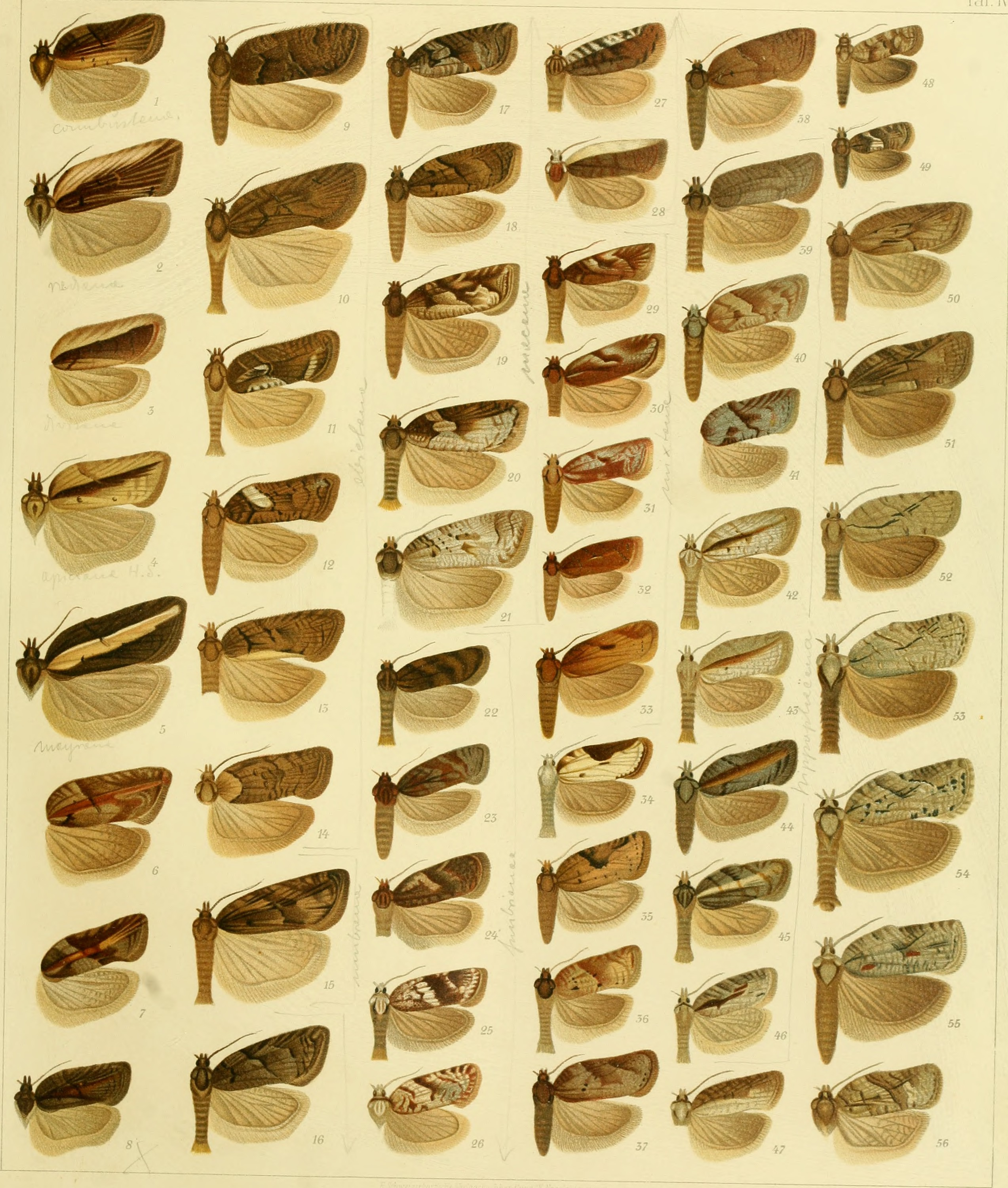
Forms of A. hastiana and related species

The wingspan is about 20 mm.Thorax with strong longitudinal crest. Forewings oblong, grey, ochreous-brown, or dark purplish-fuscous; tufts slight; veins sometimes pale, seldom broadly whitish-ochreous; edge of basal patch sometimes dark marked; central fascia and costal patch confluent, darker or red-brown, often obsolete; sometimes a white subcostal streak edged beneath with blackish, or an ochreous and ferruginous median longitudinal streak, or dorsum broadly whitish- ochreous. Hindwings light grey, somewhat darker-strigulated. Larva pale green; head and plate of 2 often brownish-tinged, sometimes black.

It is a very variable species, with dozens of named forms, and many intermediate types, which has led to its description by over 125 synonyms. Some forms closely resemble Acleris cristana so certain identification requires microscopic examination of the genitalia.

Adults are on the wing from June to July and again in August. There are two generations in much of its range.

The larvae feed on Salix species in Europe. First instar larvae bore into buds. Later instars feed in spun leaves. Other recorded food plants include Vaccinium, Andromeda, Ceanothus, Gaylussacia, Quercus and Rhododendron.

The species epithet hastiana was given by Carl Linnaeus in honor of his student, the Finnish physician Barthold Rudolf Hast, who studied natural sciences under Linnaeus at Uppsala University.
