= Georg Boldt =

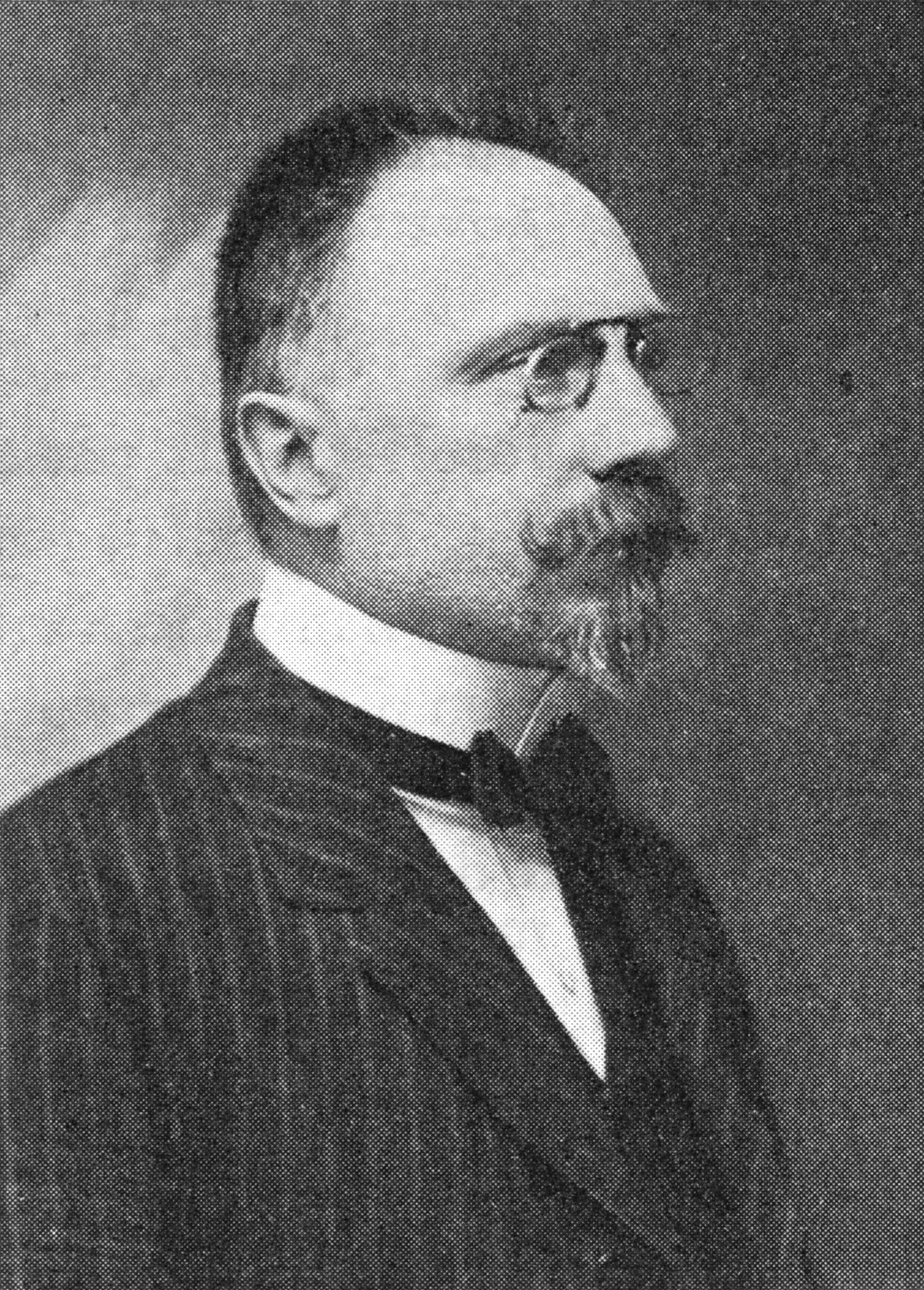
- Born: 24 August 1862; Kuopio, Grand Duchy of Finland
- Died: 21 June 1918 (aged 55); Turku, Finland
- Education: University of Helsinki
- Scientific career
- Fields: Philosophy of religion

Georg Didrik Boldt (24 August 1862 – 21 June 1918) was a Finnish philosopher of religion who was known as a socialist and tolstoyan.

== Life ==
Boldt entered the University of Helsinki in 1880. After earning his doctorate in 1902 on the dissertation on the relation between Immanuel Kant and protestantism, Boldt moved to Turku where he worked as a teacher. In the early 1900s, Boldt was interested in socialism. He was a member of the Swedish-speaking socialist group, publishing the 1908 established newspaper Arbetet. Other key members included the businessmen Walter Borg and Ivar Hörhammer, trade unionist William Lundberg, the newspapermen Axel Åhlström and K. H. Wiik, and the university student Allan Wallenius.

Boldt strongly criticized the state, conservative society and the established religious authorities. According to Boldt, the Christian leaders like Paul and Augustine had distorted the words of Jesus Christ. Boldt was influenced by the renaissance philosophers like Thomas More and Tommaso Campanella. He was also familiar with Petr Kropotkin and Mikhail Bakunin, although did not support anarchism, and was particularly interested on the pacifist philosophy of Leo Tolstoy.

When the Finnish Civil War broke out in January 1918, Boldt opposed the armed revolution and condemned the violent actions of the local Red Guard. As Germany invaded Åland in early March, Boldt and William Lundberg had negotiations with the Germans of their potential actions against the Red controlled Turku. The Reds finally left the town on 12 April. Boldt fled to Helsinki, where he was captured in late May. As a keen pacifist, Boldt was shocked by the atrocities of both sides of the war. After having a nervous breakdown, Boldt was taken into a mental institution, where he died in June 1918.

== Family ==
Boldt was born to the family of the general Johan Didrik Boldt and Anna Christina Frosterus, who was the daughter of the bishop Robert Frosterus. His brothers were the local historian Robert Boldt (1861–1923), the anarchist Jean Boldt (1865–1920) and the author Alexander Boldt (1873–1956). Boldt was married with Hildur Katarina Karlsson in 1906. Their son was the military officer Lauri Boldt (1910–1982), commanding the Finnish troops participating the United Nations Peacekeeping Force in Cyprus in the 1960s.

== Works ==
- Protestantismens idé och Immanuel Kant (1900)
- Vid orkanens utbrott : en återblick (1910)
- Franska revolutionen : den nya tidens prolog (1912)
- En teologisk polemik mellan ärkebiskop och överlärare i religion (1913)
- Solkorset och korset på Golgata (1915)
- Platon (ett föredrag) (1915)
