= Jammu Siltavuori =

Finnish child murderer and sex offender (1926–2012)

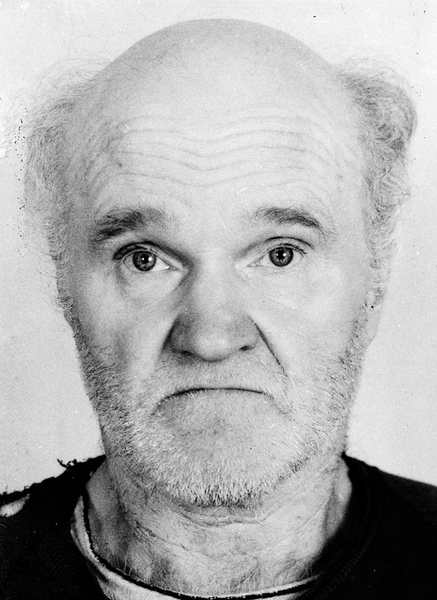
- Siltavuori in 1989
- Born: Antti Veikko Ilmari Siltavuori; October 29, 1926; Vaasa, Finland
- Died: October 9, 2012 (aged 85); Kuopio, Finland
- Other name: Uncle Jammu
- Children: 1
- Motive: Unknown

Details
- Victims: 2
- Date: March 3, 1989; 37 years ago
- Country: Finland
- Location: Vihti
- Weapons: Strangulation and pentobarbital

Antti Veikko Ilmari "Jammu" Siltavuori (29 October 1926 – 9 March 2012) was a Finnish child murderer and sex offender, and was commonly known by the nickname Uncle Jammu.

== Early life and previous crimes ==
Veikko Siltavuori was born in Vaasa, Finland. There is little information about his early childhood. According to some sources, Siltavuori's childhood was difficult because of an alcoholic father who frequently physically abused him. He was bullied in school and called a weasel because of his dirty clothing. Before the murders, he became "fairly wealthy" despite his described shabbiness and had inherited a large fortune.

Siltavuori previously had a wife and had a son and an adopted daughter. Prior to the murders, he had been convicted of raping a five-year-old girl, sexual harassment, and attempted murder for which he was sentenced to life imprisonment in the 1960s, but was later paroled. In 1966, his ex-wife was interviewed in the magazine Hymy regarding his release. In Paltamo, Kainuu, he had rented a farm and built a jail complete with cells, barred windows and small toilets, police were not completely sure whether the prison was built for child victims.

After his release, he lured numerous children to his cabin in Vihti where he would offer them alcoholic beverages, bathe with them in his sauna (whilst he was naked and they remained clothed) and play video games with them. Afterwards, he would give the youths money in exchange for them not to tell anyone they had met.

== Murders ==
On 3 March, 1989, Siltavuori lured two 8-year-old girls, Päivi-Maria Hopiavuori and Tanja Johanna Pirinen, from their homes in Myllypuro to his car where he then drove to his cottage in Vihti. Upon arrival he attempted to bribe the girls with money in exchange for them not to tell anyone that they had met him, however due to the girls' young age, the money held no worth to them. He first murdered Pirinen by giving her a lethal dose of pentobarbital before strangling Hopiavuori to death, eventually setting fire to their bodies by putting them in barrels and dousing them with gasoline, neighbours to the cottage witnessed Siltavuori burning the bodies but mistook the remains as trash. After burning their bodies, he packed the remains of the fire in the trunk of his Ford Granada and drove back to Helsinki.

== Investigation and arrest ==
Hopiavuori's mother became concerned when she had not heard from the girls by evening, and called emergency services at approximately 10:46 p.m. Based on internal investigations and archival research conducted by the Criminal Police Office of Violence, a group of police investigators were sent on 5 March to investigate Siltavuori's apartment, which was located a couple of kilometers from Myllypuro. Within his refrigerator, in which a total of 300 chocolate bars were found, which police suspected that he used to attract children, although he himself claimed to be diabetic and to keep the chocolate bars in case his blood sugar dropped too low. There were also many children's films in the apartment.

Police searched his Ford Granada and within the trunk they found ash and teeth, which they used to determine that the remains were of the two girls, there were no signs that the girls had been raped. However, fibres from the other girl's clothes were found in Siltavuori's underwear.

== Legal proceedings and imprisonment ==
For the two murders in 1989, Siltavuori was sentenced to 15 years in prison with the possibility of parole after 10 years, because a mental health examination legally found him to be partially insane. If that had not been the case, Siltavuori would have been again sentenced to life imprisonment.

After 10 years elapsed, his first and second parole hearings in a Prison Court were unsuccessful. After he served one more year in jail, the Prison Court released him on strictly supervised parole on 31 January 2000, on his third parole hearing. However, he was immediately involuntary committed to the Niuvanniemi mental hospital in Kuopio for criminal-psychiatric reasons. The involuntary commitment was reaffirmed in 2007 by the administrative court of Kuopio, on the basis that if he was released, he would be a serious security risk.

While Siltavuori was on remand in Vaasa Prison in August 1989, one of his fellow prisoners hit him on the head with a heavy stool, causing Siltavuori to lose consciousness and suffer a profusely bleeding wound to the head. The attacker was sentenced to three months in prison in addition to his previous sentence and to pay Siltavuori 750 marks in compensation for pain and suffering. Siltavuori's lawsuit for attempted murder was dismissed. During his imprisonment, Siltavuori participated in therapy for sex offenders.

== Death ==
While imprisoned, Siltavuori was attacked for the second time by another inmate, which caused Siltavuori to spend his final years in a wheelchair. He died in March 2012 at the age of 85 in Kuopio.

== Media publicity ==
The murders led to widespread media publicity, during which hundreds of letters to the editor were written about Siltavuori. An interview with Siltavuori was published in the April 1991 issue of Rikosposti, in which he said that he believed he was the most hated person in Finland. There were demands for him to receive death penalty and castration as punishment.

Antti Siltavuori, an industrial designer from Kirkkonummi, was the target of a telephone terror because of his name, and an old man was beaten in a restaurant in Helsinki because he resembled Siltavuori in appearance. The protesters' signs read, among other things: "A sex offender does not get better in prison. Experts in favor of involuntary treatment."

== Literature ==
- Markkula, Hannes: Kuusi suomalaista murhaa. 1996.
