= Fettig =

Fettig is a surname. Notable people with the surname include:

- François Josephe Fettig (1822–1902), French entomologist
- Jason Fettig (born 1974), United States military officer
- Jeff M. Fettig (born 1957), American businessman
