= Barthold Rudolf Hast =

Finnish physician (1724–1784)

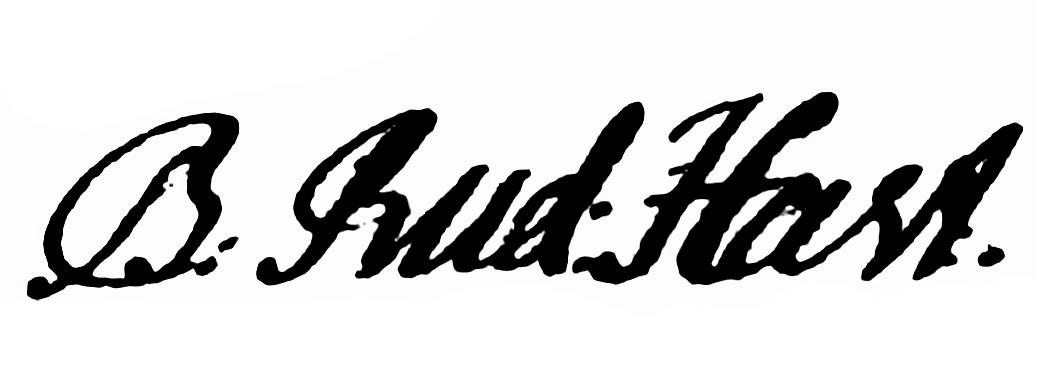
Signature

Barthold Rudolf Hast (9 April 1724 – 27 August 1784) was a Finnish physician who played a leading role in the early development of healthcare in 18th-century Finland, then part of the Swedish kingdom. He was the first Finn to earn a Doctor of Medicine degree in Sweden and served for over three decades as provincial physician of Ostrobothnia. Hast was a pioneer of smallpox inoculation and contributed significantly to improving medical access by operating pharmacies in Vaasa an Oulu and establishing medicine stores in several coastal towns. He played a key role in founding a regional hospital in Vaasa, then only the second general hospital in Finland.

== Early life and education ==
Rudolf Hast was born in Vaasa, in western Finland. His father, Herman Henrik Hast, was a barber-surgeon (fältskär) from Westphalia who served as a provincial surgeon in the region and as a regimental surgeon in the Ostrobothnian Regiment from 1721 until his death in 1749. He also operated a pharmacy in Vaasa and published a medical handbook titled Kårt underrättelse om några medicamenters bruk wid et hus apoteque (Stockholm, 1746).

Hast received his elementary education at Vaasa trivial school between 1733 and 1739. In 1740, he enrolled at the Royal Academy of Turku (Åbo), where he began his medical studies under Professor Herman Diedrich Spöring. In 1744, he continued his education at Uppsala University. In addition to his medical training, Hast studied natural sciences under Carl Linnaeus, under whom he defended a scientific dissertation titled Amphibia Gyllenborgiana in 1745. Linnaeus later honored Hast by naming a moth species, Tortrix hastiana, after him. He completed his medical degree in 1747 with the medical dissertation Decades Binae thesium medicarum, supervised by Nils Rosén von Rosenstein, becoming the first Finn to earn a Doctor of Medicine degree in Sweden.

== Medical career ==
After completing his doctorate in 1747, Rudolf Hast was appointed district physician of Southern Finland, based in Helsinki. Following the death of his father in 1749, he was appointed to the newly created office of provincial physician of Ostrobothnia, based in Vaasa, a position he held until 1783. The post of provincial physician (provinsialläkare) was part of a new administrative structure introduced in Finland after the Russo-Swedish War of 1741–1743, and was initially funded by provincial collections before later becoming state-funded.

=== Pharmacies and hospital ===
When Hast began his service, Ostrobothnia lacked both a hospital and adequate access to medicine. He took over his late father's pharmacy in Vaasa and later established additional medicine shops in towns such as Oulu, Nykarleby, Kokkola, and Raahe. Formal pharmacies were eventually established in Oulu in 1762 and in Kokkola in 1781.

Hast’s responsibilities extended across all of Ostrobothnia, a vast and sparsely populated region with poor infrastructure and long travel distances. Until 1774, when a second physician was appointed in Oulu, he was solely responsible for providing medical care throughout the entire province. Although surgery was typically performed by barber-surgeons, Hast was a skilled surgeon in his own right, having learned the craft from his father. Known for his conscientious service, he regularly traveled across the province, as required by the 1744 and 1766 provincial physician instructions. His work was supported by barber-surgeons and apprentices, who assisted with both surgical duties and the distribution of medicines.

In 1764, Rudolf Hast applied for the professorship in medicine at the Royal Academy of Turku but was not selected. In 1768, he helped establish a hospital in Vaasa, the second of its kind in Finland after the one in Turku (established in 1759), and served as its physician until 1777.

Hast also promoted public health through the introduction of mineral spas in Vaasa and Oulu in the 1750s and 1760s. He also contributed to veterinary public health. A pamphlet on combating cattle plague was published in 1786, two years after his death.

=== Smallpox inoculation ===
Hast was one of the first people in Finland to introduce smallpox inoculation, starting in 1756. This early method, known as variolation, involved using material from smallpox sores to cause a mild case of the disease, which helped the body build immunity. In 1762, the government agreed to pay Hast 32 öre for every child he successfully inoculated, along with bonuses for every hundred children treated. Between 1768 and 1784, he reported treating 15,848 children and earned more than 10,000 riksdaler for his work.

Hast also trained local parish priests to perform inoculations and to run village pharmacies. Thanks to his efforts, the region of Ostrobothnia became the most successful area in Finland at controlling smallpox, leading to major improvements in health and survival.

== Recognition and later life ==
In 1762, Hast was awarded the honorary title of assessor in recognition of his service as provincial physician. He was also a member of the Aurora Society in Turku. Hast resigned from his position as provincial physician on 15 September 1783 and died in August 1784.

Rudolf Hast was married twice. His first wife was Briitta Heleena Peldan, who died in 1771. In 1773, he married Margareeta Katariina Bladh, sister of the merchant Petter Johan Bladh. His son, Herman Rudolf Hast, succeeded him as provincial physician in Ostrobothnia, continuing the family tradition into a third generation.
