= Niuvanniemi Hospital =

- Ministry of Social Affairs and Health
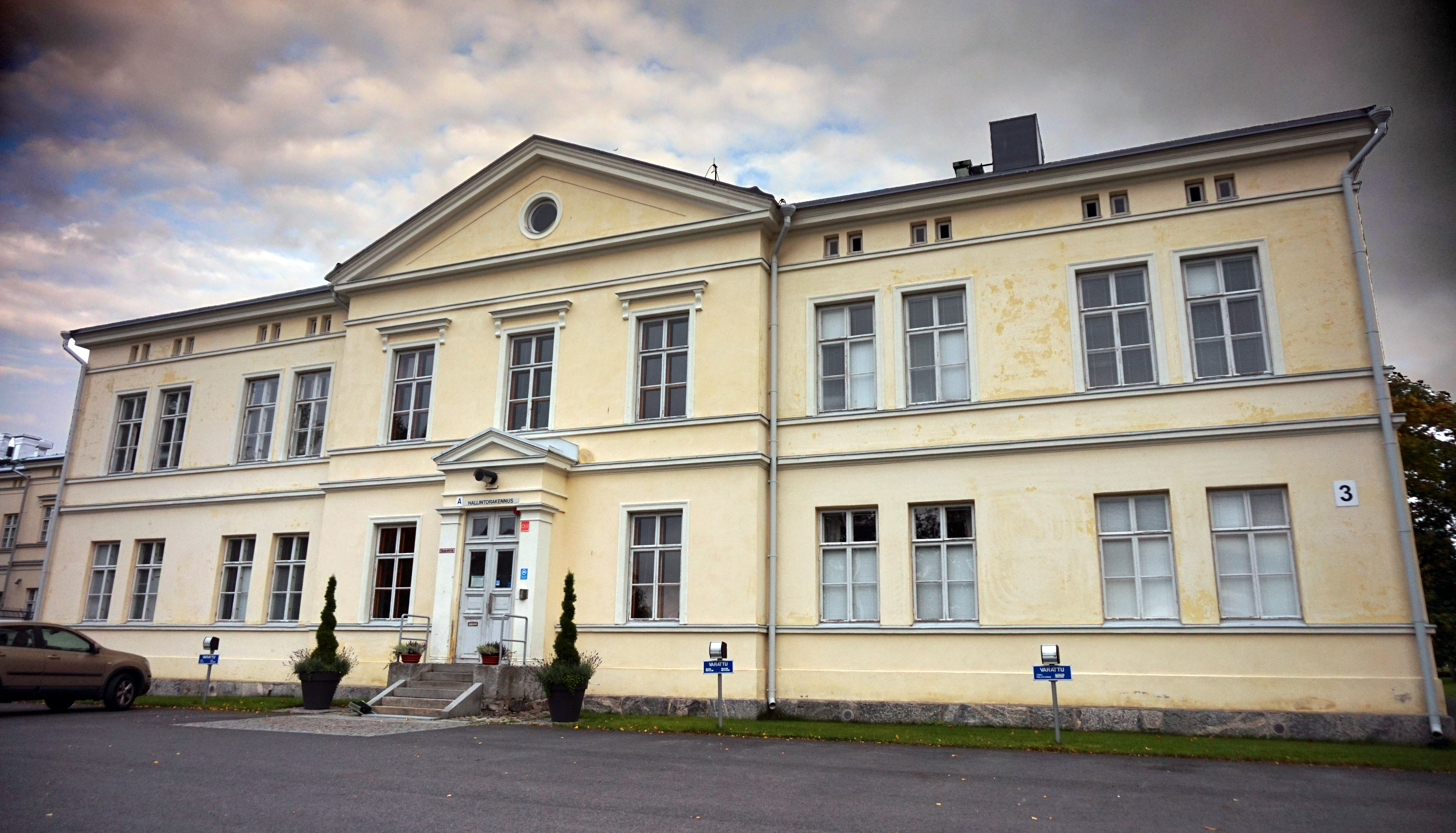
- Administration building of the hospital

Geography
- Location: Niuva, Kuopio, Finland
- Coordinates: 62°54′54″N 27°37′25″E

Organisation
- Type: Specialist

Services
- Beds: 307
- Speciality: Forensic psychiatry

History
- Opened: 1885

Links
- Lists: Hospitals in Finland

Niuvanniemi Hospital is a state psychiatric hospital in Kuopio, Finland. Along with the other state mental hospital, Vanha Vaasa Hospital, it provides forensic psychiatric services for the entire country. With 307 beds, of which 23 are for minors, Niuvanniemi is the largest hospital in the Nordic countries for involuntary commitment of forensic patients, i.e., individuals that a court has found criminally insane. The hospital also receives so called difficult-to-treat or dangerous psychiatric patients from other Finnish hospitals. Niuvanniemi Hospital is also prominent in forensic psychiatry research, serving as the department of forensic psychiatry of University of Eastern Finland.

Niuvanniemi Hospital was founded in 1885, and is thus the oldest psychiatric hospital still in operation in Finland. Annually, Niuvanniemi Hospital conducts about half of the court-ordered psychiatric assessments in Finland. In 2025, 56% of patients were those whose sentence for a serious crime has been waived due to mental illness; they are committed for 7 years and 11 months on average. Difficult-to-treat patients are committed on average 5 years and 6 months.

Niuvanniemi is not a correctional institution, i.e., all patients are treated as mental health patients, under mental health legislation, not as convicts. Therefore, there are no set time limits for detention. Prisoners with a need for institutional psychiatric services are treated in the psychiatric hospital for prisoners in Turku and Vantaa, under Health Care Services for Prisoners.

== Notable patients ==
- Jean Boldt
- Jammu Siltavuori
- Sanna Sillanpää
