= Joseph Émile Macker =

French entomologist

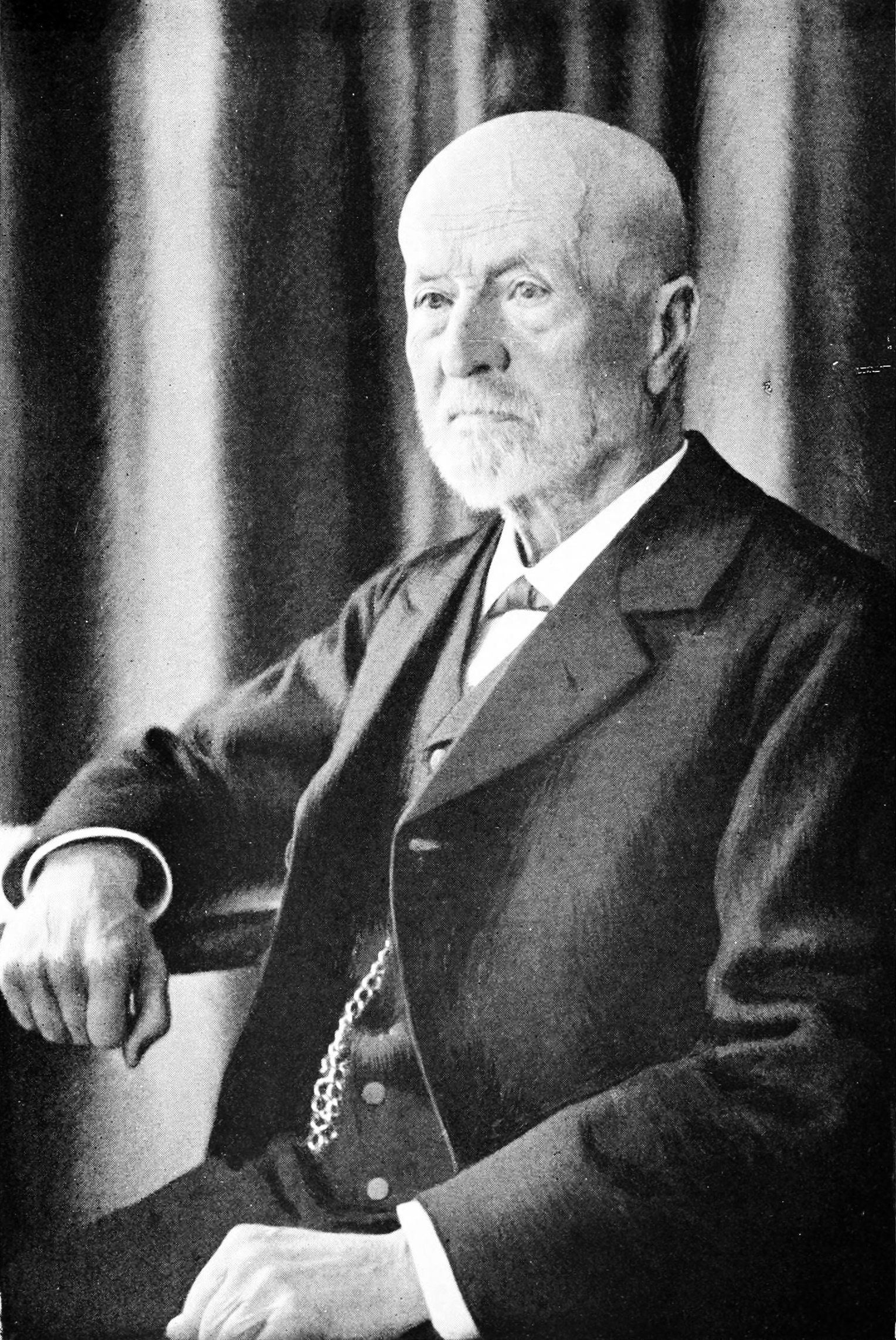
Dr. Joseph Émile Macker

Joseph Émile Macker, also Emile Macker (27 February 1828 – 3 December 1916) was a French entomologist specialising in Lepidoptera.

Émile Macker was a Doctor in Colmar.

== Works ==
Partial list:

- Catalogue des Lépidopteres d'Alsace avec indications des localités, de l'époque d'apparition et de quelques détails propres à en faciliter la recherche. I. Macrolépidopteres revue et coordonnée par M. le Dr. Macker. II. Microlépidoptères revue et coordonnée par M. l'Abbé Fettig.
