= Sanna Sillanpää =

Finnish killer

- Born: Sanna Riitta Liisa Sillanpää; 15 April 1968 (age 58)
- Occupation: IT worker
- Employer: Fujitsu Finland Oy
- Status: Upheld on appeal
- Criminal charges: Manslaughter
- Penalty: Found legally insane

Details
- Locations: Albertinkatu, Helsinki
- Killed: 3
- Injured: 1
- Weapon: 9mm Beretta 92FS semi-automatic pistol

Sanna Riitta Liisa Sillanpää (born 15 April 1968) is a Finnish woman who shot three men to death with a rented 9mm Beretta 92FS semi-automatic pistol on 21 February 1999 in a shooting range in Albertinkatu, Helsinki, and wounded another man, who received lifetime injuries. One man present was not harmed. One of the dead was the shooting club's 23-year-old supervisor.

As Sillanpää was leaving the club, she said: "This is what they taught us at the FBI academy, isn't it?". She then traveled from the Helsinki center to the Helsinki-Vantaa Airport in a city bus, carrying a gun and ammunition. At the airport, she was trying to buy a ticket to "somewhere". Sillanpää was caught after four hours as she was boarding an airplane to London. Before boarding the plane she left the gun in a trash can in the airport terminal. It was discovered by a cleaner.

== Trial ==
At the trials and hearings, Sillanpää did not speak at all. No motive for the act was found. In mental health examinations Sillanpää was found to have schizophrenia, and had a delusion of being the widow of an agent of the Federal Bureau of Investigation, whose death she had to avenge. She appeared to be a fan of The X-Files, and the police investigated the possibility of the series having a plot line similar to Sillanpää's actions, although nothing of the sort was found.

In district court, the state prosecutor Maarit Loimukoski demanded Sillanpää to be imprisoned for three acts of manslaughter without full understanding (partially insane) and two attempted acts of manslaughter, but on 11 October 1999, the district court deemed Sillanpää legally insane.

Loimukoski appealed the decision to the Helsinki Court of Appeal, but the decision was upheld on 11 October 2000. Loimukoski explained that the reason for her demand for punishment was that Sillanpää had acted with premeditation in attempting to flee Finland and hiding the gun after the act. Sillanpää was sent to the Niuvanniemi mental hospital in Kuopio.

Sillanpää, 30 years old at the time, has a Master's degree in computer science and is an IT expert who worked for Fujitsu Finland Oy in Helsinki.

After the incident, the Ministry of the Interior demanded that the security and permissions of commercial shooting ranges should be checked. The rules for first-timer participation on shooting ranges were subsequently made more strict.

== Books ==
- Pohjolan poliisi kertoo 2001 (article: Ampumaratasurmat)
