= Vanha Vaasa Hospital =

Coordinates: 63°04′19″N 021°42′39″E

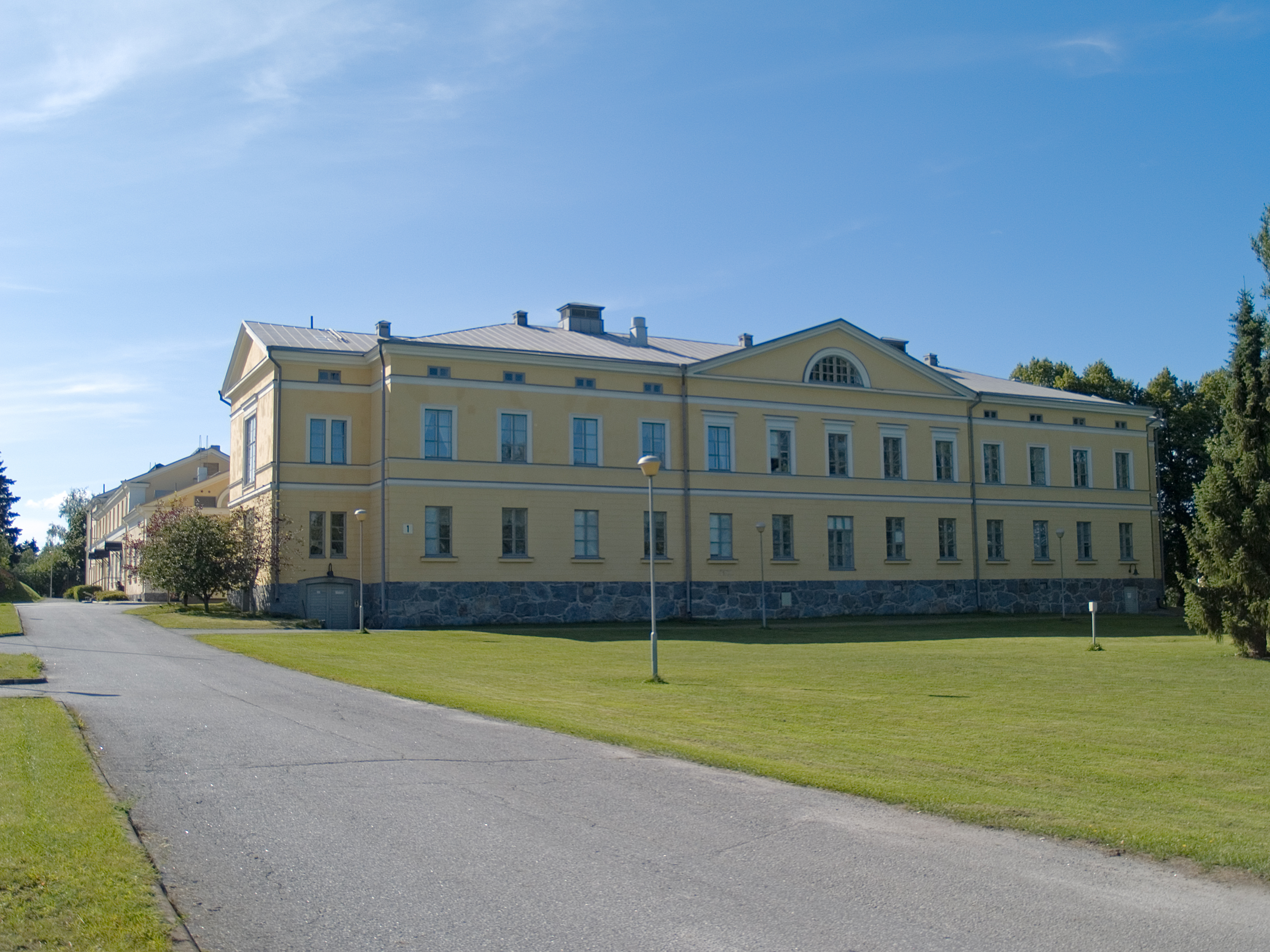
- The main building of the hospital, designed by Carl Ludvig Engel.

Geography
- Location: Vierinkiventie 1, 65380 Vaasa, Finland

Organisation
- Type: Forensic psychiatric hospital

Links
- Website: Official website

Vanha Vaasa Hospital (Finnish: Vanhan Vaasan sairaala) is a state-owned forensic psychiatric hospital located in Vaasa, Finland. It is one of the two state-owned psychiatric hospitals in Finland, alongside Niuvanniemi Hospital in Kuopio. The hospital provides specialized forensic psychiatric services nationwide.

The hospital carries out mental state examinations and treats individuals who have been assessed as not criminally responsible for their actions. In addition, it provides care for patients suffering from severe psychiatric conditions. Approximately half of the hospital’s patients receive forensic psychiatric treatment, while the other half require hospitalization due to the severity of their conditions. Most of the hospital wards are closed and separated by gender, but there is also a mixed ward and an open ward. Treatment at the hospital is typically long-term, often lasting several years.

== History ==
Vanha Vaasa Hospital was originally established in 1768 as a general provincial hospital in rented premises. It received its own building in 1769, and its current main building was completed in 1844. The hospital was known as Mustasaari Hospital until 1988.

The hospital's first physician was Barthold Rudolf Hast, who was also Finland's first district physician under Swedish rule. During his tenure, the number of patients increased from two to 30–50. In 1889, Mustasaari Hospital was converted into a psychiatric hospital. In 1939, it was designated as a forensic psychiatric hospital.

From 1939 to 1963, the hospital's chief physician was Yrjö K. Suominen, who controversially advocated for the euthanasia of mentally ill individuals in a 1945 publication, citing racial hygiene theories. From 1963 to 1992, the hospital director was Eeva Kauppi, who also served as a National Coalition Party MP. The current chief physician is Pirjo Takala.
