= Niuva =

City district in Kuopio, Finland

Coordinates: 62°54′53.3″N 27°37′34.3″E

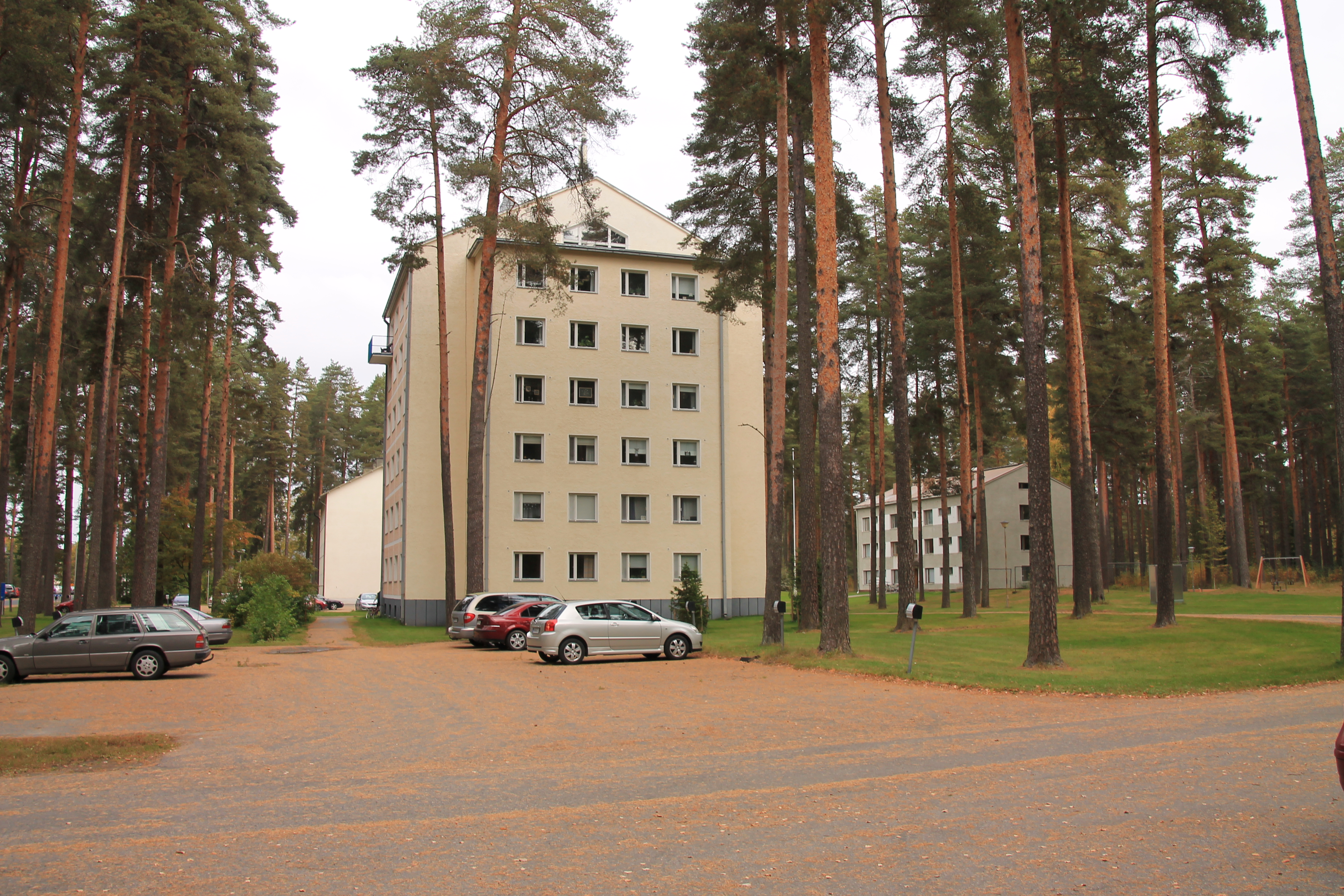
An apartment buildings of Niuvanniemi

Niuva is a district in the western part of the city of Kuopio, Finland. It is well known as the historic Niuvanniemi mental hospital. In terms of land use, Niuva is mainly a field area around the hospital. The district has few settlements and services, located mainly in the hospital area. However, there is a Länsi-Puijo kindergarten along Suurmäentie. There is a beach on the shore of Lake Kallavesi, just south of the Niuva district in Puijonlaakso.
