= Walter Borg =

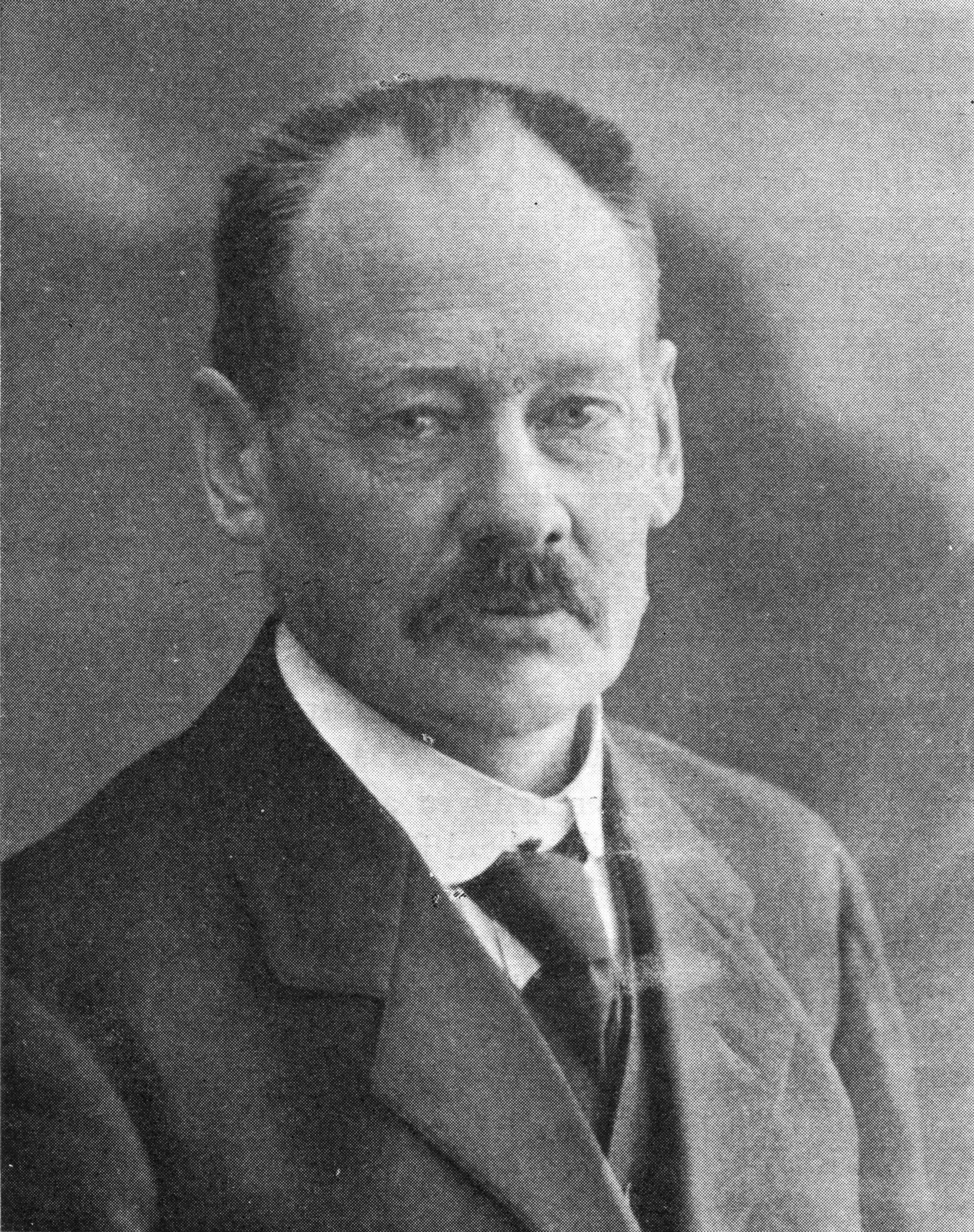
Walter Borg

Walter Johan Borg, born 21 June 1870 in Jakobstad, Finland; died 6 June 1918 in Petrograd, was a Swedish-speaking Finn, a merchant, idealist and socialist.

== Biography ==
The same year Walter Borg was born his father (according to the parish book) escaped to America. At that time this was not uncommon among young men who received call-up orders to the Russian army. In 1881 Walter moved with his mother from Jakobstad to her hometown Vaasa. In 1890, he received a final grade of Raahe Burgher and Trade School, a four-year mercantile institution with a good reputation. In 1894 Borg moved from Vaasa to Hanko, where he was employed as a clerk. There he married Ida Ojala on March 20, 1894. The couple had six sons and two daughters. In 1896 he moved his family to Vaasa. From Vaasa the family moved in 1900 to Tampere and from there to Turku. In Turku, he was employed by the Bore Company as head of its harbor offices. After a few years he resigned and founded in 1898 his own agency in the food industry.

It is not known when Borgs political engagement began, but it was as an activist, he first made his name. Through his employment at the Bore Company he could help many Russian revolutionaries who fled via Finland from Russia, among them Lenin.

The Swedish Workers' Association of Turku was founded in 1903 and Borg became a member of it. However, he never became a prominent figure in the association and let alone any political protagonist. Because of a progressive lung disease his involvement was restricted.

The newspaper Arbetet (The Work), which was founded in 1909, committed Borg strongly. He became the newspaper's driving force and soon he managed the entire magazine. He never undertook the post of responsibility and it was respected, probably for his bad health's sake and for the sake of his own company. His brother in law Janne Ojala who undertook this post did not even serve a year before he was charged with lese-majesty and was serving a six-month prison sentence, the same thing happened to the successor Ivar Hörhammer.

The editing of the magazine fell to Borgs lot while he also was its most hard-working writer. So he continued to edit the magazine for years and years until he could no longer, and he continued to write even longer. The image of Walter Borg lying in bed at 40 degrees fever and dictating his articles for his wife has gone to posterity.

With the strike in November 1917 culminated the events in Finland that had been triggered by the March Revolution in Russia the same year. Walter Borg had already in 1916 for health reasons, resigned as the newspaper's editor. But he still wrote, and when he did, especially in 1917, it was obvious that he was of a revolutionary spark. He had taken sides. The two brothers in law Walter Borg and Janne Ojala had always been a little further out on the left wing than most of the paper's other employees, and that they chose the storm when it arrived, doesn't really surprise.

When the war broke out Walter Borg was, as often before, at Nummela sanatorium, but this time he did not stay for long. The red commander in Turku offered him the post as head of the Turku office of the Bank of Finland - and he accepted.

In early April 1918 the Germans landed in Hanko and Loviisa and began their advance towards Helsinki. When Tampere also shortly afterwards fell, the war was lost for the reds and the retreat eastward began. Refugees fled by train from Turku. On the night of 8 April the first train with refugees left Turku and on it was Walter Borg.

Like many other refugees Walter Borg eventually ended up in Petrograd (now St Petersburg). It was here he wrote his diary. From 22 April the character of the diary changed and was now written in the form of daily letters to his wife Ida. The diary ends abruptly. The reason can be found in the first of two letters Karin Strindberg (also refugees in Petrograd) wrote to Ida Borg.

”It is my unspeakable heavy duty to tell You that our beloved friend and comrade Walter Borg died of pneumonia June 6. On 26 May, he suddenly got an acute haemorrhage, which took much of his strength, the fever rose high and sustained, and on the 30th he was transferred to a very good private hospital where the care was the best.”

— Anna Bondestam: Walter Borg (1870–1918), grosshandlare and revolutionary

Karin Strindberg sent his diary and other belongings to Ida Borg that same summer.

This is a translation of the same article in Swedish Wikipedia.

== Sources ==
- Anna Bondestam: Walter Borg (1870-1918), grosshandlare och revolutionär, i avsnittet Eldsjälar i Arbetet, En tidning i Åbo på 1910-talet och människorna kring den, Svenska Litteratursällskapet i Finland, 1968, pages 161–180.
