= Jean Boldt =

Finnish journalist (1865–1920)

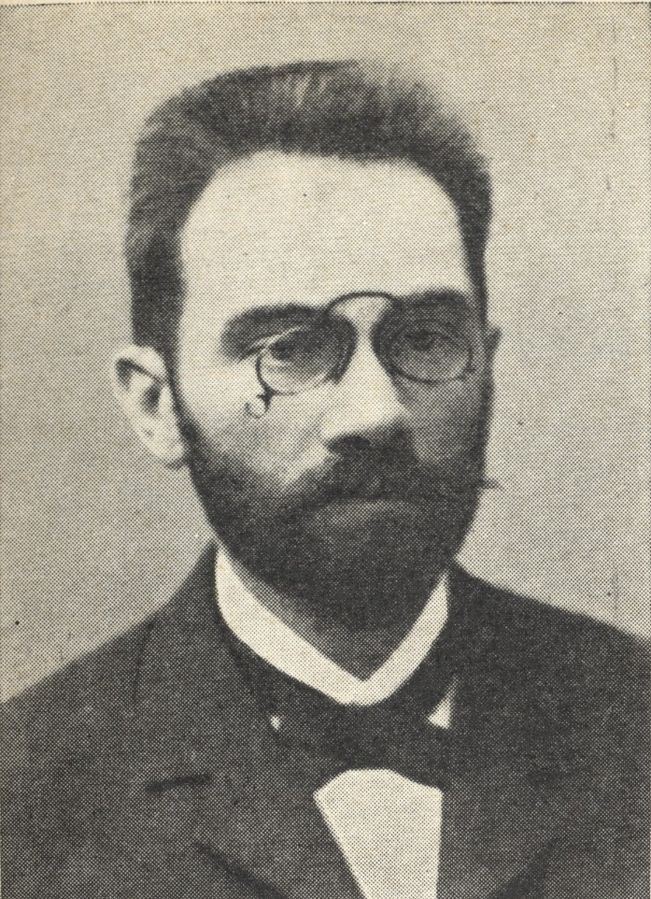
Jean Boldt.

Johan Carl Emil (Jean) Boldt (19 April 1865 – 16 May 1920) was a Finnish lawyer and journalist, who was known as a theosophist and anarchist.

== Life ==
Boldt was born in the Eastern Finnish town of Kuopio. He studied law in the University of Helsinki graduating in 1886. In the 1890s, Boldt became interested in socialism, tolstoyanism and theosophy. In 1896–1898, he was the editor of the pacifist magazine Humanitas. It was disbanded as the founder Matti Kurikka exiled to North America. In 1900, Boldt and Pekka Ervast established the shortly-lived theosophic magazine Uusi Aika (The New Age).

During the first years of the 1900s, Boldt moved from tolstoyanism to socialism, but his views were considered too radical and Boldt was not accepted to the Social Democratic Party. In the 1910s, Boldt became an anarchist. After the 1917 February Revolution he organized demonstrations by Helsinki Cathedral. At the same time, the tolstoyan anarchist Arvid Järnefelt kept meetings in the cathedral as well as several other Helsinki churches. Since the beginning of June, Boldt and his supporters gathered daily. He also tried to set up an armed guard in response to the Social Democrat Red and right-wing White Guards, but this never succeeded.

Finally, in 17 June, a Boldt led a group of anarchists who took over the Helsinki Cathedral. After an 18-hour siege, the militia stormed the church and arrested Boldt, which caused riots at the next Senate Square. According to the newspaper stories, Boldt had 400 supporters. He was taken to the Niuvanniemi mental institution, but his supporters still had demonstrations by the cathedral for several weeks.

Boldt died in the Kulosaari district of Helsinki in 1920 at the age of 55. His literary work includes a collection of Swedish-language poetry and pamphlets on prostitution, militarism and animal protection.

== Family ==
Boldt was born to the family of the general Johan Didrik Boldt and Anna Christina Frosterus, who was the daughter of the bishop of the Diocese of Oulu, Robert Frosterus. His brothers were the local historian Robert Boldt (1861–1923), the author Alexander Boldt (1873–1956) and the philosopher of religion and socialist Georg Boldt (1862–1918).

== Works ==
- Prostitutionens reglementering och läkaresällskapet, 1896.
- Ett upprop mot militarismen, 1901.
- Kors-sånger 1, 1909.
- Det stora dårhuset, 1916.
