= Pekka Ervast =

Finnish writer (1875–1934)

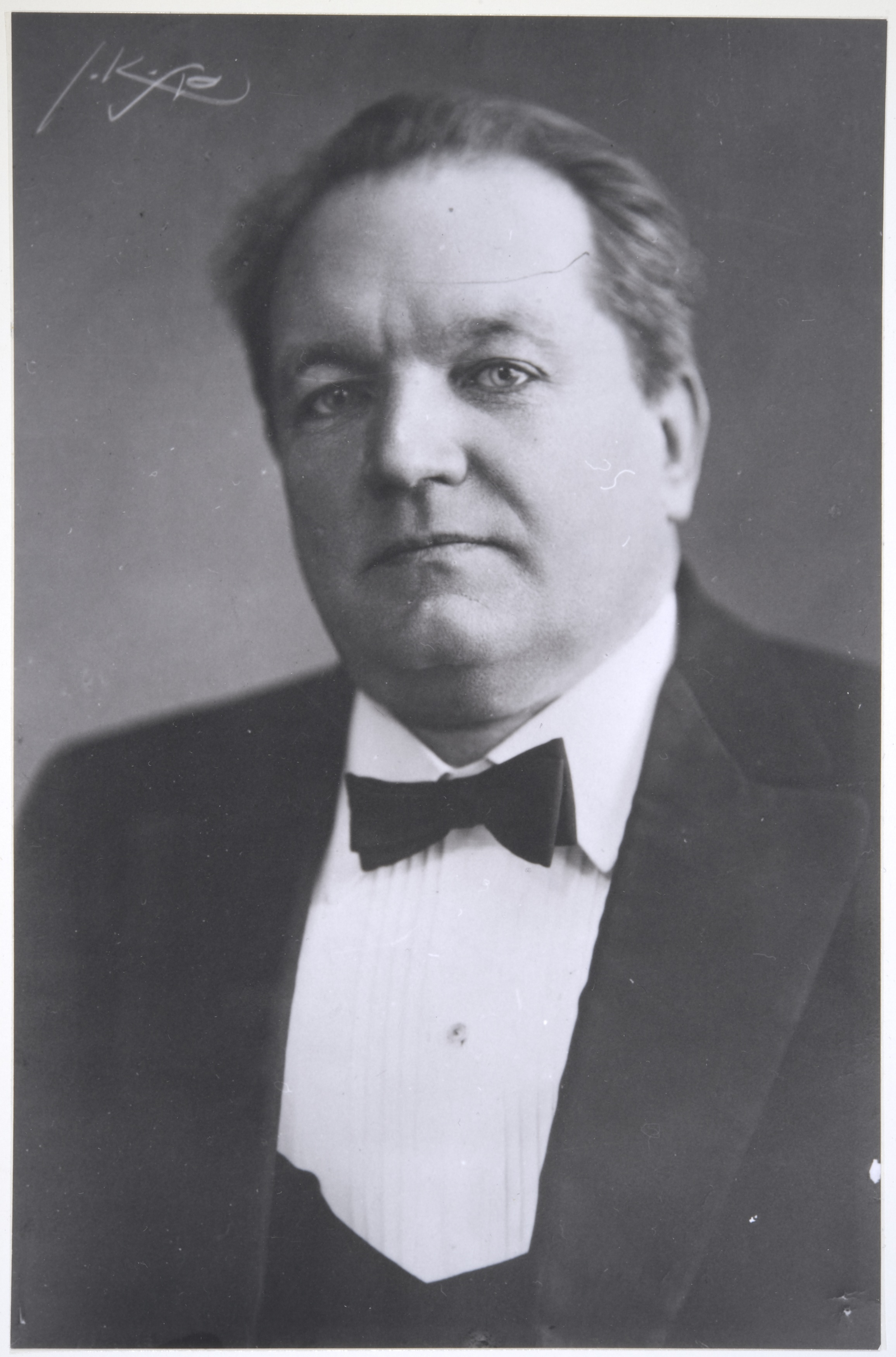
- Ervast in the 1920s
- Born: Pekka Elias Ervast; 26 December 1875; Helsinki, Finland
- Died: 22 May 1934 (aged 58); Helsinki, Finland
- Occupation: Writer

Pekka Elias Ervast (26 December 1875, Helsinki — 22 May 1934, Helsinki) was a Finnish writer.

Ervast joined 1895 the Swedish Theosophical society and started 1907 the Finnish Theosophical society, Suomen Teosofinen Seura. He was chief secretary there 1907–17 and editor for the journals Omatunto 1905–07 and Tietäjä 1908–20. When the society split up 1920 he founded Ruusu-Risti society and the journal Ruusu-Risti. He is buried in the Hietaniemi Cemetery in Helsinki.

Meanwhile, he also joined the International Masonic Order for Men and Women Le Droit Humain.

He got his inspiration from Leo Tolstoy.
