= Prison Court =

Special court in Finland

Prison Court (Finnish: vankilaoikeus) was a special court in Finland with jurisdiction over involuntary commitment of dangerous repeat offenders and sentencing of juvenile offenders into detention centers. The court had a special composition, as it consisted of two permanent judges, a psychiatrist and a scholar with expertise in intoxicant and drug rehabilitation. The institution was closed down in 2006, and was superseded by ordinary administrative courts.
