= Marius Boldt =

Norwegian footballer (born 1989)

Personal information
- Date of birth: 3 February 1989 (age 37)
- Height: 1.85 m (6 ft 1 in)
- Position: Defender

Team information
- Current team: Åssiden
- Number: 3

Youth career
- Åssiden
- Strømsgodset

Senior career*
Years	Team	Apps	(Gls)
2007–2010	Strømsgodset	5	(0)
2010–2011	Notodden	17	(2)
2011–2012	Mjøndalen	13	(0)
2013–	Åssiden		
- * Club domestic league appearances and goals as of 25 March 2010

Marius Boldt (born 3 February 1989) is a Norwegian football defender for Mjøndalen. Boldt is a product of the Strømsgodset youth system, and made his first league start for the first team away at Tromsø in a 2–0 defeat.
