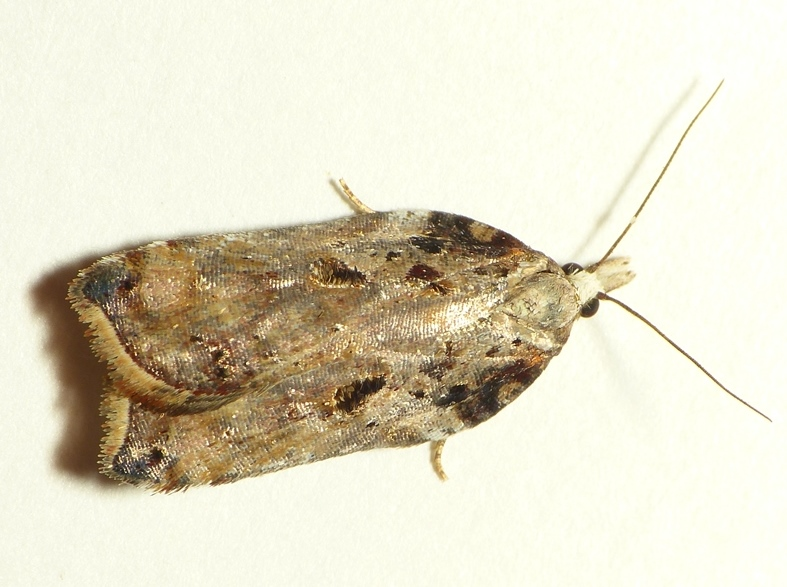

Scientific classification
- Kingdom: Animalia
- Phylum: Arthropoda
- Clade: Pancrustacea
- Class: Insecta
- Order: Lepidoptera
- Family: Tortricidae
- Genus: Acleris
- Species: A. cristana

Binomial name
- Acleris cristana (Denis & Schiffermüller, 1775)

Synonyms
- List: Tortrix cristana [Denis & Schiffermüller], 1775; Peronea cristana f. albicapitana Sheldon, 1930; Teras albicostana Sand, 1879; Peronea albipunctana Stephens, 1829; Peronea (Lopas) albipunctana Stephens, 1834; Peronea alboflammana Curtis, 1834; Peronea alboflavana Curtis, 1834; Peronea cristana ab. albonigrana Clark, 1901; Peronea cristana ab. alboruficostana Clark, 1901; Acleris cristana f. albosericana Fairclough, 1981; Peronea albovittana Stephens, 1829; Peronea (Lopas) albovittana Stephens, 1834; Acleris cristana f. alisana Fairclough, 1981; Peronea cristana f. apiciana Sheldon, 1930; Acalla cristana ab. aquilina Larsen, 1927; Peronea cristana ab. atrana Clark, 1901; Peronea cristana ab. attaliana Clark, 1901; Acleris azumina Yasuda & Kawabe, 1980; Peronea bentleyana Curtis, 1834; Peronea brunneana Stephens, 1829; Peronea (Lopas) brunneana Stephens, 1834; Peronea capucina Capucina, 1842; Peronea chantana Curtis, 1834; Peronea cristana ab. charlottana Clark, 1901; Peronea cristana ab. clarkiana Webb, 1910; Peronea consimilana Stephens, 1829; Peronea (Lopas) consimilana Stephens, 1834; Phalaena cristalana Donovan, [1794]; Peronea capucina var. curtisana Desvignes, 1845; Pyralis desfontainana Fabricius, 1794; Acleris cristana f. dualana Fairclough, 1981; Pyralis ephippiana Fabricius, 1798; Peronea cristana ab. flammeana Webb, 1911; Peronea flavana Capucina, 1842; Peronea cristana ab. flavana Sheldon, 1921; Peronea cristana ab. flavostriana Webb, 1911; Acleris cristana f. fordana Fairclough, 1981; Peronea cristana ab. fulvana Sheldon, 1921; Peronea fulvocristana Stephens, 1829; Peronea (Lopas) fulvocristana Stephens, 1834; Peronea cristana ab. fulvopunctana Sheldon, 1921; Acleris cristana f. fulvopurdeyana Fairclough, 1981; Acleris cristana f. fulvosericana Fairclough, 1981; Peronea striana var. fulvostriana Desvignes, 1845; Peronea fulvovittana Stephens, 1829; Peronea (Lopas) fulvovittana Stephens, 1834; Peronea cristana ab. fuscana Clark, 1901; Teras gibbosana Treitschke, 1835; Peronea cristana ab. gumpiana Clark, 1901; Peronea gumpinana Capucina, 1842; Acleris cristana f. inornana Fairclough, 1981; Peronea insulana Curtis, 1834; Peronea cristana ab. intermediana Clark, 1901; Acleris cristana f. janetana Fairclough, 1993; Peronea jansoniana Webb, 1910; Peronea cristana ab. larseni Strand, 1918; Peronea lefebvriana Duponchel, in Godart, 1835; Peronea lichenana Curtis, 1834; Acleris cristana f. manleyana Fairclough, 1981; Peronea cristana ab. masoniana Clark, 1901; Peronea cristana ab. merlana Clark, 1901; Peronea cristana ab. nigrana Clark, 1901; Acleris cristana f. nigrocapitana Fairclough, 1981; Peronea cristana ab. nigrocostana Clark, 1901; Peronea cristana ab. nigrocristana Clark, 1901; Acleris cristana f. nigrofulvana Fairclough, 1981; Peronea cristana ab. nigropunctana Clark, 1901; Acleris cristana f. nigropurdeyana Fairclough, 1993; Peronea cristana ab. nigroruficostana Webb, 1910; Acleris cristana f. nigrosubcristalana Fairclough, 1981; Acleris cristana f. nigrosubpurdeyana Fairclough, 1993; Peronea cristana ab. nigrosubvittana Clark, 1901; Acleris cristana f. obscurana Fairclough, 1981; Acleris cristana f. ochreafulvana Fairclough, 1981; Peronea cristana ab. ochreana Sheldon, 1918; Peronea cristana ab. ochreapunctana Clark, 1901; Acleris cristana f. palistriana Fairclough, 1981; Acleris cristana f. parvana Fairclough, 1993; Peronea cristana ab. procapucina Huggins, 1949; Peronea cristana ab. prochantana Clark, 1901; Peronea cristana ab. procristalana Webb, 1911; Pyralis profanana Fabricius, 1794; Acleris cristana f. proinsulana Fairclough, 1981; Acleris cristana f. prosequana Fairclough, 1993; Peronea cristana ab. prostriana Clark, 1901; Acleris cristana f. prosubchantana Fairclough, 1981; Peronea profana var. provittana Desvignes, 1845; Peronea cristana ab. proxanthovittana Clark, 1901; Peronea cristana ab. punctana Clark, 1901; Peronea cristana ab. purdeyana Webb, 1910; Pyralis rossiana Fabricius, 1794; Peronea ruficostana Curtis, 1834; Peronea cristana ab. ruficristana Webb, 1910; Peronea cristana ab. rufinigrana Clark, 1901; Peronea semiustana var. semistriana Desvignes, 1845; Peronea semiustana Curtis, 1834; Peronea cristana ab. sepiana Sheldon, 1917; Peronea sequana Curtis, 1834; Tortrix sericana Hubner, [1796-1799]; Peronea cristana ab. sheldoniana Huggins, 1949; Peronea cristana ab. southiana Sheldon, 1921; Tortrix spadiceana Haworth, [1811]; Peronea (Lopas) spadiceana Stephens, 1834; Tortrix striana Haworth, [1811]; Peronea cristana ab. subalboflammana Clark, 1901; Peronea capucina var. subcapucina Desvignes, 1845; Peronea cristana ab. subchantana Clark, 1901; Peronea subcristalana Curtis, 1834; Peronea cristana ab. subfulvovittana Clark, 1901; Peronea cristana ab. subnigrana Image, 1917; Acleris cristana f. subochreanigrana Fairclough, 1981; Peronea substriana Stephens, 1829; Peronea (Lopas) substriana Stephens, 1834; Peronea cristana ab. subunicolorana Clark, 1901; Acleris cristana f. subxanthovittana Fairclough, 1981; Peronea desfontainana var. tolana Desvignes, 1845; Peronea cristana ab. transversana Clark, 1901; Peronea cristana ab. ulotana Clark, 1901; Peronea unicolorana Desvignes, 1845; Peronea cristana ab. ustulana Sheldon, 1921; Peronea cristana ab. vaughaniana Webb, 1911; Peronea vittana Stephens, 1829; Peronea (Lopas) vittana Stephens, 1834; Peronea cristana ab. webbiana Sheldon, 1921; Peronea xanthovittana var. xanthovittana Desvignes, 1845

= Acleris cristana =

Species of moth

Acleris cristana, the rufous-margined button moth, is a moth of the family Tortricidae and is found from Europe through the Caucasus and Ussuri to Japan.

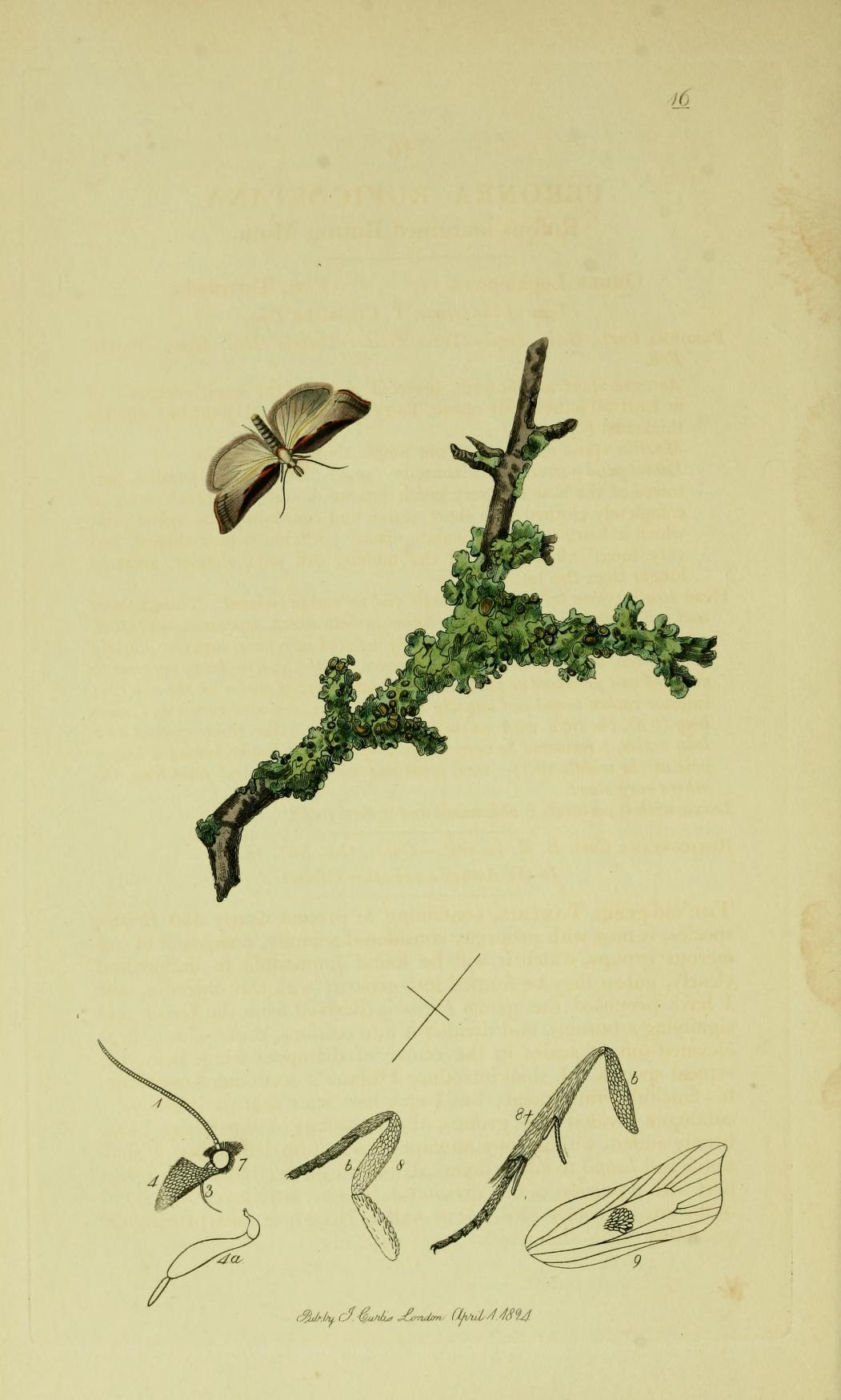
Illustration from John Curtis's British Entomology Volume 6

The wingspan is 18–22 mm. Thorax with strong longitudinal crest. Forewings reddish-ochreous to dark brown, sometimes bicolorous; a very large sometimes white scale-tuft in middle of disc; sometimes a white or pale ochreous dorsal streak, or an orange central longitudinal streak; sometimes two fascia-like whitish streaks from costa converging to middle of disc. The hindwings grey, apex darker. It shows a wide variation in appearance and has 137 named forms as well as numerous synonyms. Forms look different but are the same species and can breed together. Julius von Kennel provides a full description.

Adults are on wing from August to November and again from March to May after hibernation.

The larvae feed between spun leaves on various rosaceous trees and bushes, including Prunus spinosa and Crataegus species (e.g. Crataegus maximowiczi). Other recorded food plants include Carpinus betulus, Ulmus campestris, Rosa, Malus species (including Malus pumila), Salix caprea, Sorbus sambucifolia, Cerasus sachalinensis, Prunus salicina and Zelkova serrata.
