= Ivar Hörhammer =

Finnish politician, journalist and art dealer (1884–1953)

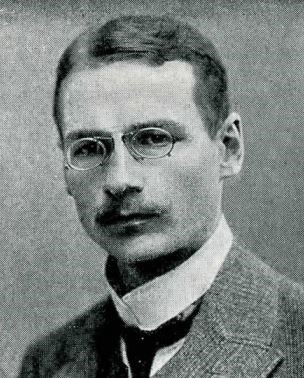
- Ivar Hörhammer in 1909

Member of the Finnish Parliament for Uusimaa constituency
- In office 1 June 1909 – 31 January 1911

Personal details
- Born: 11 February 1884 Örebro, Sweden
- Died: 3 February 1953 (aged 68) Helsinki, Finland
- Party: Social Democratic Party of Finland

Ivar Gabriel Hörhammer (11 February 1884 – 3 February 1953) was a Finnish art dealer, journalist and politician. He was a member of the Parliament of Finland 1909–1911 for the Social Democratic Party. After his political career Hörhammer was one of the leading art gallerists in Finland.

== Life ==
Hörhammer was the son of Bavarian brewmaster Karl Ludwig Hörhammer (1835–1913) and Norwegian-Danish Josefine Charlotte von Wildenrath (born 1843). As Hörhammer was born, the family moved to Turku, Finland. Since the age of 16, he worked as an office clerk in Helsinki.

Hörhammer joined the labour movement after the 1905 general strike. He worked at the Swedish-language newspapers Arbetaren, Social-Demokraten and Arbetet and published the monthly Folktribunen. In 1910–1912, he was the editor of Arbetet. In the 1909 parliamentary election, Hörhammer was elected to the Parliament of Finland. He was a member of the Finnish delegation in the Second International 1910 congress in Copenhagen. In 1915, Hörhammer was sentenced for six months of lèse-majesté for an article published in Arbetaren in November 1910.

After his prison term, Hörhammer left politics and became an art dealer. In September 1918, he founded the Galerie Hörhammer which was active in Helsinki until 2016. During the 1920s, Hörhammer became one of the prominent art gallerists and patrons of Finland. Hörhammer was also a talented chess player. He was the chairman of Finnish Chess Federation and FIDE awarded arbiter.
