= François Josephe Fettig =

French entomologist (1824–1906)

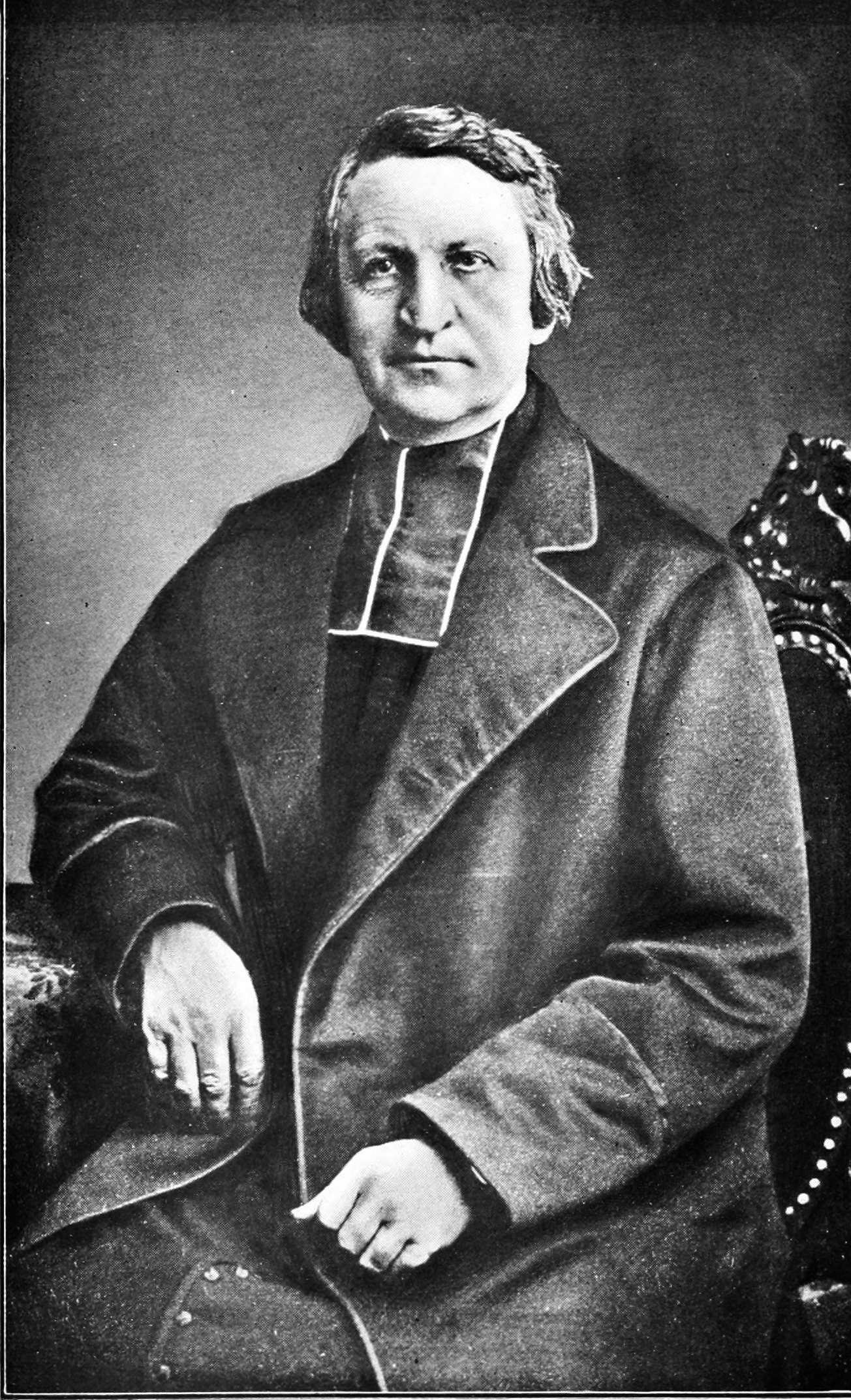
Abbé Fettig

Abbé François Joseph Fettig (10 July 1824, Mothern near Wissembourg – 5 May 1906, Matzenheim) was a French entomologist specialising in Lepidoptera and Coleoptera.

His collections are shared between Muséum national d'histoire naturelle (Coleoptera), Museum Colmar (Microlepidoptera and larvae, destroyed or badly damaged) and Zoological Museum, Strasbourg (Macrolepidoptera).

== Works ==
partial list

- Catalogue des Lépidopteres d'Alsace avec indications des localités, de l'époque d'apparition et de quelques détails propres à en faciliter la recherche. I. Macrolépidopteres revue et coordonnée par M. le Dr. Macker. II. Microlépidopteres revue et coordonnée par M. l'Abbé Fettig.
