= Löyly =

Bar and restaurant in Hernesaari, Helsinki

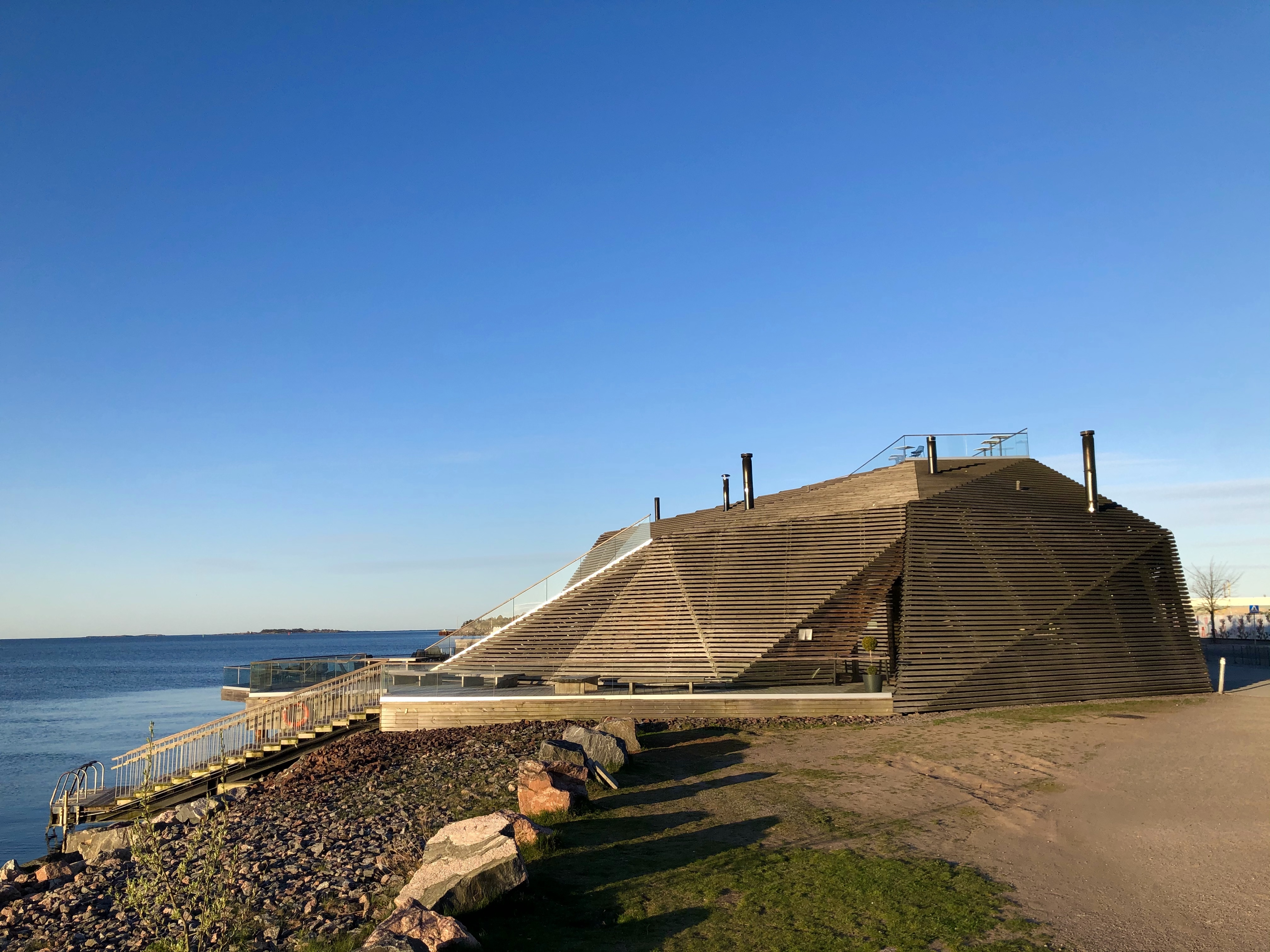
- Löyly in May 2020
- Interactive map of Löyly
- Address: Hernesaarenranta 4
- Location: Hernesaari, Helsinki, Finland
- Coordinates: 60.151917°N 24.930111°E
- Owner: Jasper Pääkkönen
- Type: public sauna, restaurant, bar

Construction
- Opened: 2016

Website
- www.loylyhelsinki.fi/en/front-page/

Löyly (Finnish: [ˈløy̯ly]) is a public sauna, restaurant and bar in Hernesaari, Helsinki, Finland, and it opened in 2016.

Löyly's owner is actor Jasper Pääkkönen. The building is designed by Avanto Architects Ltd. Hernesaari is a former industrial area on the Helsinki sea shore that is planning to become a residential area. New use is developed for the area already now while waiting for the future change. As the site is part of Helsinki Park following the capital's coastline, the sauna was designed to blend into the landscape. The whole building forms also a huge outdoor auditorium, and visitors can climb on the roof terrace and even on the lookout to see the views. Löyly offers foreign visitors a public all year round sauna experience.

The building has become one of Helsinki main tourist attractions. Löyly is published in many leading magazines and newspapers. Time magazine included Löyly in its 2018 list of the World's 100 Greatest Places. CNN′s Richard Quest called Löyly "chic" in March 2019 and also Vogue highlighted Löyly in their 2017 coverage.

The building's unique architecture has won numerous prizes including: Chicago Athenaeum international architecture award 2018, Architizer A+ Awards Jury + Popular Vote Winner 2017, Iconic best of best 2017, IOC IAKS Award Silver medal 2017, Build architecture award 2017, Helsinki City building control quality award "Rose for Building" 2016, WAN Wood in Architecture 2016. The project got an honorary mention in International Space Design Award Idea tops 2016. The project was finalist in following competitions: Prix International d’Architecture Bois 2018, Nordic Architecture Fair Award 2017. Löyly was nominated for Mies van der Rohe –prize 2017, Finlandia prize for Architecture 2016, Philippe Rotthier European Prize for Architecture 2017 (was selected in the catalog), Finnish Interior Architecture Journalists’ Prize 2017, and both for Finnish Wood, Concrete and Steel prizes in 2016.

== See also ==
- Finnish sauna
- Kotiharjun Sauna – another public sauna in Helsinki
