= Kotiharjun Sauna =

Public sauna in Helsinki, Finland

Coordinates: 60.1865°N 24.9572°E

Entrance of the sauna

Kotiharjun Sauna is a public sauna located in the Kallio district's Torkkelinmäki neighborhood in Helsinki, Finland. It is Helsinki's oldest public sauna still in operation, having been established in 1928, and at the same time, Helsinki's only remaining traditional wood-heated neighborhood sauna.

The Finnish Heritage Agency submitted a proposal to grant heritage protection to the interiors of Kotiharjun Sauna, and in December 2023, the Uusimaa Centre for Economic Development, Transport and the Environment (ELY Centre) issued a decision requiring the preservation of the sauna's ground-floor interiors and their fixed fixtures. The second floor was not granted protection, as the ELY Centre determined that doing so could result in unreasonably high costs for the housing company that owns the sauna.

== See also ==
- Löyly – another public sauna in Helsinki
- Rajaportin sauna – the oldest public sauna of Finland, located in Tampere

== Sources ==
=== Further reading ===
- Siponen, Satu. Kotiharjun sauna 1928-1998 (in Finnish). Kotiharjun saunayhdistys.
