= World Sauna Championships =

Discontinued Finnish endurance contest

- Sport: Sauna bathing
- Founded: 1999
- First season: 1999
- Folded: 2010
- Last champions: (Finland) Ilkka Pöyhiä (men) (Germany) Michaela Butz (women) (2010)
- Most titles: (Finland) Timo Kaukonen (men) (Finland) Leila Kulin / (Belarus) Natallia Tryfanava (women)

The World Sauna Championships were an annual endurance contest held in Heinola, Finland, from 1999 to 2010. They originated from unofficial sauna-sitting competitions that resulted in a ban from a swimming hall in Heinola. The Championships were first held in 1999 and grew to feature contestants from over 20 countries. Sauna bathing at extreme conditions is a severe health risk: all competitors competed at their own risk, and had to sign a form agreeing not to take legal action against the organizers. Notably, the Finnish Sauna Society strongly opposed the event.

After the death of one finalist and near-death of another during the 2010 championship, the organizers announced that they would not hold another event. This followed an announcement by prosecutors in March that the organizing committee would not be charged for negligence, as their investigation revealed that the contestant who died may have used painkillers and ointments that were forbidden by the organizers.

== Format ==
The championships began with preliminary rounds and ended in the finals, where the best six men and women would see who could sit in the sauna the longest. The starting temperature in the men's competition was 110 °C (230 °F). Half a litre of water was poured on the stove every 30 seconds. The winner was the last person to stay in the sauna and walk out without outside help. The host country usually dominated the event, as only one foreign competitor ever made it into the finals in the men's competition. The first non-Finnish winner in the women's competition was Natallia Tryfanava from Belarus in 2003. Timo Kaukonen was a five-time mens champion, winning every year from 2005 to 2009. There were no prizes except for "some small things," according to organizer. One year, Timo Kaukonen received special speakers designed for home saunas.

=== Rules ===
- The starting temperature is 110 degrees Celsius. Half a litre of water will be poured on the stove every 30 seconds.
- Use of alcohol is prohibited prior to and during the competition.
- Competitors must wash themselves beforehand, and remove any creams and lotions.
- Competitor must sit erect, their buttocks and thighs on the bench.
- Ordinary swimsuits must be used. Pant legs in men's swimsuits may be up to 20 centimetres long, and women's shoulder straps may be up to 5 centimetres wide.
- Hair that reaches the shoulders must be tied into a ponytail.
- Touching the skin and brushing is prohibited.
- Competitors must not disturb each other.
- At the request of the judges, competitors must show that they are in their senses with a thumbs up.
- Competitors must be able to leave the sauna unaided to qualify.
- A breach of the rules results in a warning. Another one results in disqualification.
- The last person leaving the sauna unaided is the winner.

== TV broadcasting and other media ==
In 2004, Nippon Television filmed a documentary about the World Sauna Championships. The program had an audience of about 40 million in Japan. The network did a similar documentary again in 2007, when they filmed a whole week in Heinola and in Lahti. This time Kazumi Morohoshi (former singer in a popular boy band Hikaru Genji) was with them and also took part in the competition. He ended in the first round, with a time of 5:41. Also in 2007, American sportswriter Rick Reilly (who described it as "quite possibly the world's dumbest sport") was also in Heinola. His time in the first round was 3:10, and he was eliminated from the second round.

== 2010 incident ==
On 7 August 2010, two competitors were removed from the sauna and brought to the hospital in critical condition after six minutes of 110 °C (230 °F) heat, both suffering from serious burns and trauma. Russian finalist and former third-place finisher Vladimir Ladyzhensky, an amateur wrestler, was dragged out, suffering from convulsions, burns, and blisters. Ladyzhensky died despite resuscitation. Finnish five-time champion Timo Kaukonen was, according to a spectator, able to leave the sauna with assistance. He was reported to suffer from extreme burn injuries and his condition was described as critical but stable. Kaukonen's preparation included hydrating meticulously and growing his hair long enough to cover the tips of his ears, making them less likely to burn. Just a few minutes before the finals, Kaukonen told the Norwegian newspaper Verdens Gang that the saunas used for the 2010 championship were a lot more extreme than the saunas used for previous competitions. As Kaukonen and Ladyzhensky were disqualified for not leaving the sauna unaided, Ilkka Pöyhiä became the winner.

The organizer, Ossi Arvela, said that there will probably never be another sauna competition. Two days later the City of Heinola noted that there are no official decisions about the future of the event, and the decisions would be made after the incident has been examined. Arvela later reported that Finnish police had decided not to file charges in connection with the tragedy, but were continuing to investigate. Kaukonen woke up from a medically induced coma six weeks after the event. His respiratory system was scorched, 70% of his skin was burnt and eventually his kidneys failed as well. In late October, Kaukonen was reported to be recovering quickly. He did not blame the organizers for his injuries.

Ladyzhensky's autopsy concluded that he had died of third-degree burns. His death was aided by his use of strong painkillers and local anesthetic grease on his skin, which was against the rules. Kaukonen was competing according to the rules.

On 20 April 2011, the City of Heinola announced that they would no longer organize the event, noting that "If the city was to organize the World Sauna Championships in the future, the original playful and joyous characteristics of the event should be reintroduced. No ways to achieve this have been found."

== Champions ==
Year	Men	Women
1999	(Finland) Ahti Merivirta	(Finland) Katri Kämäräinen
2000	(Finland) Leo Pusa	(Finland) Katri Kämäräinen
2001	(Finland) Leo Pusa	(Finland) Annikki Peltonen
2002	(Finland) Leo Pusa	(Finland) Annikki Peltonen
2003	(Finland) Timo Kaukonen	(Belarus) Natallia Tryfanava
2004	(Finland) Leo Pusa	(Belarus) Natallia Tryfanava
2005	(Finland) Timo Kaukonen	(Belarus) Natallia Tryfanava
2006	(Finland) Timo Kaukonen	(Finland) Leila Kulin
2007	(Finland) Timo Kaukonen	(Finland) Leila Kulin
2008	(Finland) Bjarne Hermansson	(Finland) Leila Kulin
2009	(Finland) Timo Kaukonen	(Russia) Tatyana Arkhipenko
2010	(Finland) Ilkka Pöyhiä	(Germany) Michaela Butz

== See also ==
- Finnish sauna
