= Finnicism =

Borrowings from Finnic languages

A finnicism or fennicism is a word or grammatical feature borrowed from Finnic languages into a non-Finnic one. Most often they occur in the contacting languages: Indo-European (Slavic, Germanic and Baltic), other Ugric languages, as well as Turkic (Chuvash, Tatar).

A well-known Finnicism in many languages is "sauna".

A few of them exist in Lithuanian, e.g., burė, sail (cf. Estonian and Finnish purje), laivas, ship (cf. Finnish laiva), etc.

Marta Rudzīte reports that there are about 500 finnicisms in Latvian. In particular, there was an influence of Livonian (and vice versa).

An early record of Finnicisms in East Slavic manuscripts was reported in 1893 by Izmail Sreznevsky in his book Материалы для словаря древнерусского языка по письменным памятникам. In Russian language there are many Finnic toponyms. The old Slavic word пъре, from Finnish purje, "sail", is used in the old Primary Chronicle. There are many Finnicisms in the dialects of Russian North.

There was a considerable influence of Finnish on Estonian. During the Soviet era the flow of Finnicisms into Estonian was restricted, and the used Finnish loanwords mostly came before that time.

In Swedish, Finnicisms are most common in Finland Swedish. In studies of the culture of Finland Swedes, a broader category, Finlandisms is considered, which, in addition to Finnicisms, includes other features peculiar to Finland Swedish, e.g., Swedish words with meanings or morphology not found in standard Swedish. The use of Finlandisms is generally discouraged, with the exception of words referring to specifically Finnish phenomena.
