= Oukup =

Among the Karo people of North Sumatra, Indonesia, the oukup is a traditional form of sauna in which the bather is wrapped in blankets with spice-scented steam coming from a boiling cauldron. The modern oukup is now done using steam piped into a small room. A similar bath, known as mar-tup was practised by the Batak Toba people. Both tribes traditionally performed the bath after childbirth, but it is now used as a general restorative or for relaxation, and oukup parlours typically also offer massage services.

Many modern oukup parlours can be found in Medan and other cities in North Sumatra, since the opening of the first modern oukup parlour in 1992 in Medan. The bath is scented using fresh ginger, turmeric, pepper, star anise, temu kunci, coriander, celery leaves, kencur, and many other spices and herbs. Oukup parlours can now also be found in other parts of Indonesia, such as Jakarta.
