= Rajaportin sauna =

Public sauna in Tampere, oldest in Finland

Coordinates: 61°30′08″N 23°43′11″E

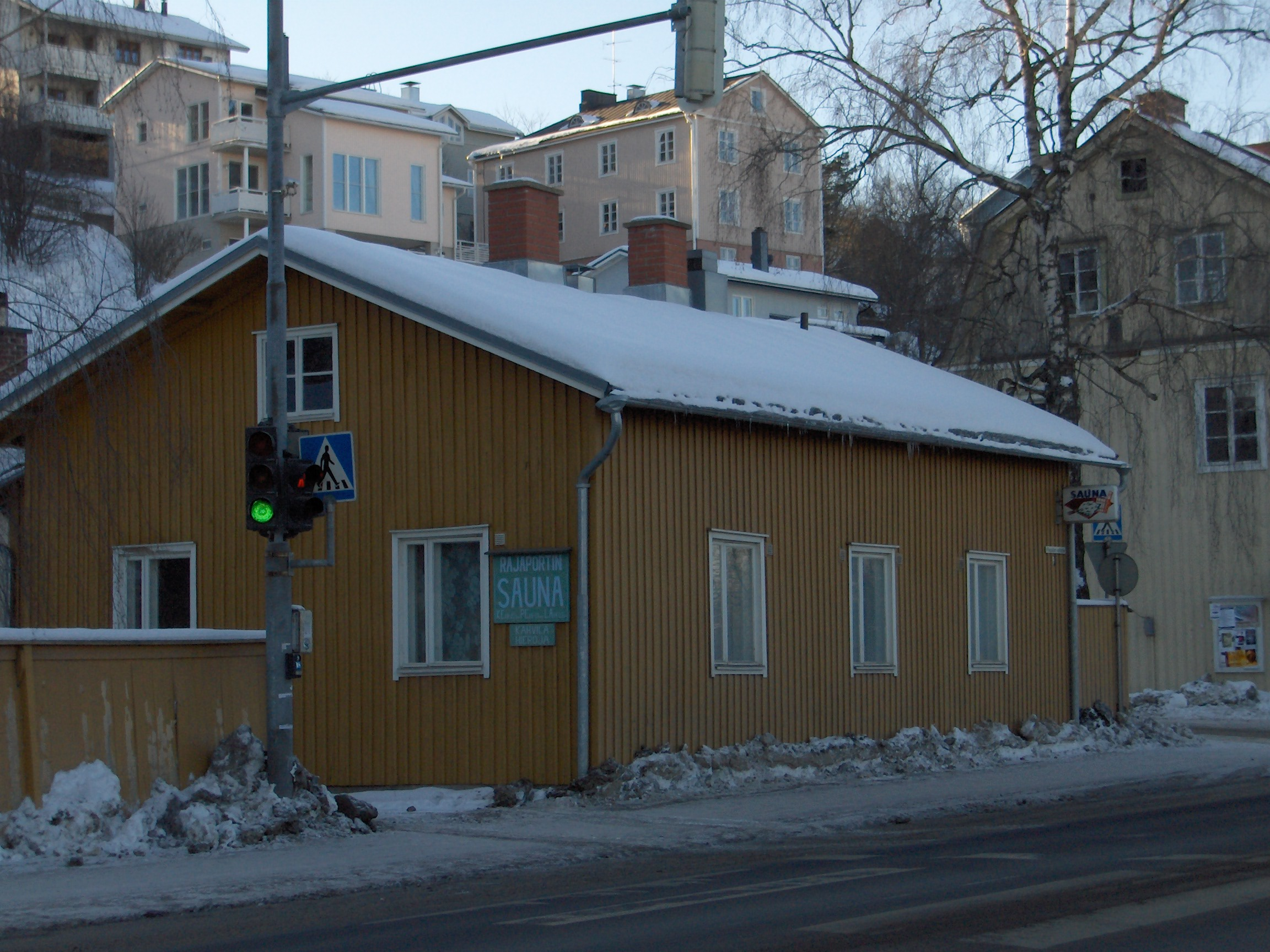
Rajaportin sauna.

Rajaportin sauna is Finland's oldest working public sauna. The sauna was founded in 1906 in Pispala in Tampere.

Rajaportin Sauna is owned by Tampere city and run by the Pispalan saunayhdistys ry.
