= Sauna =

Type of bathhouse

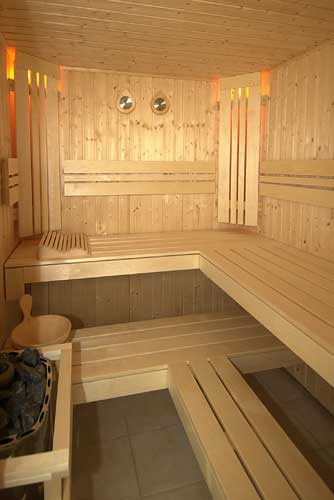
A modern Finnish sauna

A sauna (/ˈsɔːnə, ˈsaʊnə/, Finnish: [ˈsɑu̯nɑ]) is a room or building designed as a place to experience dry or wet heat sessions or an establishment with one or more of these facilities. The steam and high heat make the bathers perspire. A thermometer in a sauna is used to measure temperature; a hygrometer can be used to measure levels of humidity or steam.

== Etymology ==
The word sauna is an ancient Finnish word referring to both the traditional Finnish bath and to the bathhouse itself. In Finnic languages other than Finnish and Estonian, sauna and cognates do not necessarily mean a building or space built for bathing. It can also mean a small cabin or cottage, such as a cabin for a fisherman. The word is the best known Finnicism in many languages.

Petri Kallio has proposed a Germanic etymology, a hypothesis which has gained some scholarly support. In this account, the word is derived from Proto-Germanic *stakka- or its earlier Palaeo-Germanic form. The Germanic word is cognate with English stack and originally denoted a pile or heap, interpreted here as referring to an early sauna oven consisting of a pile of stones. The loan word would have developed into Proto-Finnic *sakna, from which the Finnish sauna later evolved.

== History ==
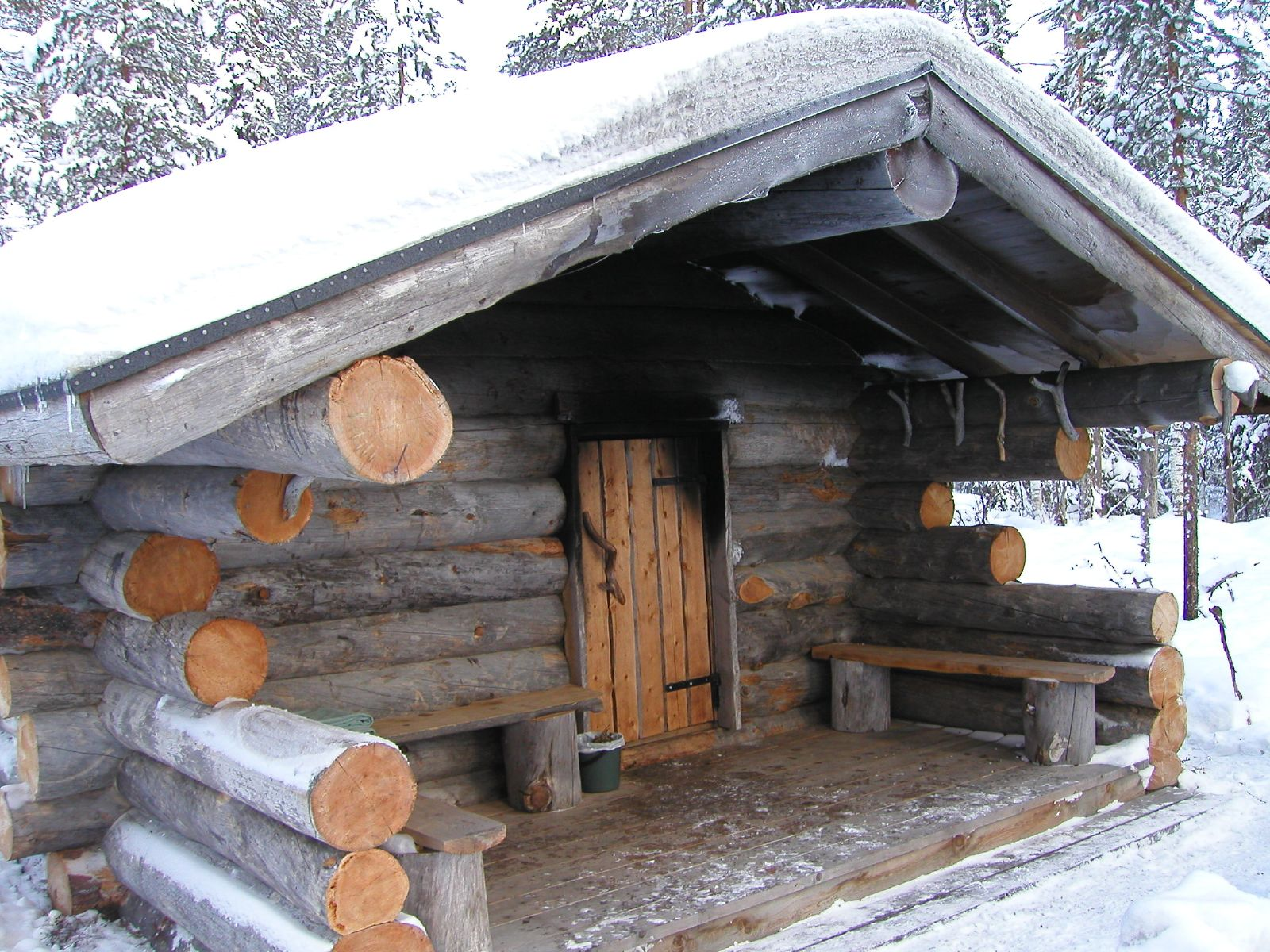
A Finnish smoke sauna

Areas such as the rocky Orkney islands of Scotland have many ancient stone structures for normal habitation, some of which include dedicated areas for fire and bathing. It is possible some of these structures also incorporated the use of steam in a way similar to the sauna, but this remains speculative. The sites are from the Neolithic age, dating to approximately 4000 BCE. Archaeological sites in Greenland and Newfoundland have uncovered structures very similar to traditional Scandinavian farm saunas, some with bathing platforms and "enormous quantities of badly scorched stones".

The traditional Korean sauna, called the hanjeungmak, is a domed structure constructed of stone that was first mentioned in the Sejong Sillok of the Annals of the Joseon Dynasty in the 15th century. Supported by Sejong the Great, the hanjeungmak was touted for its health benefits and used to treat illnesses. In the early 15th century, Buddhist monks maintained hanjeungmak clinics, called hanjeungso, to treat sick poor people; these clinics operated separate facilities for men and women due to high demand. Korean sauna culture and kiln saunas are still popular today, and Korean saunas are ubiquitous.

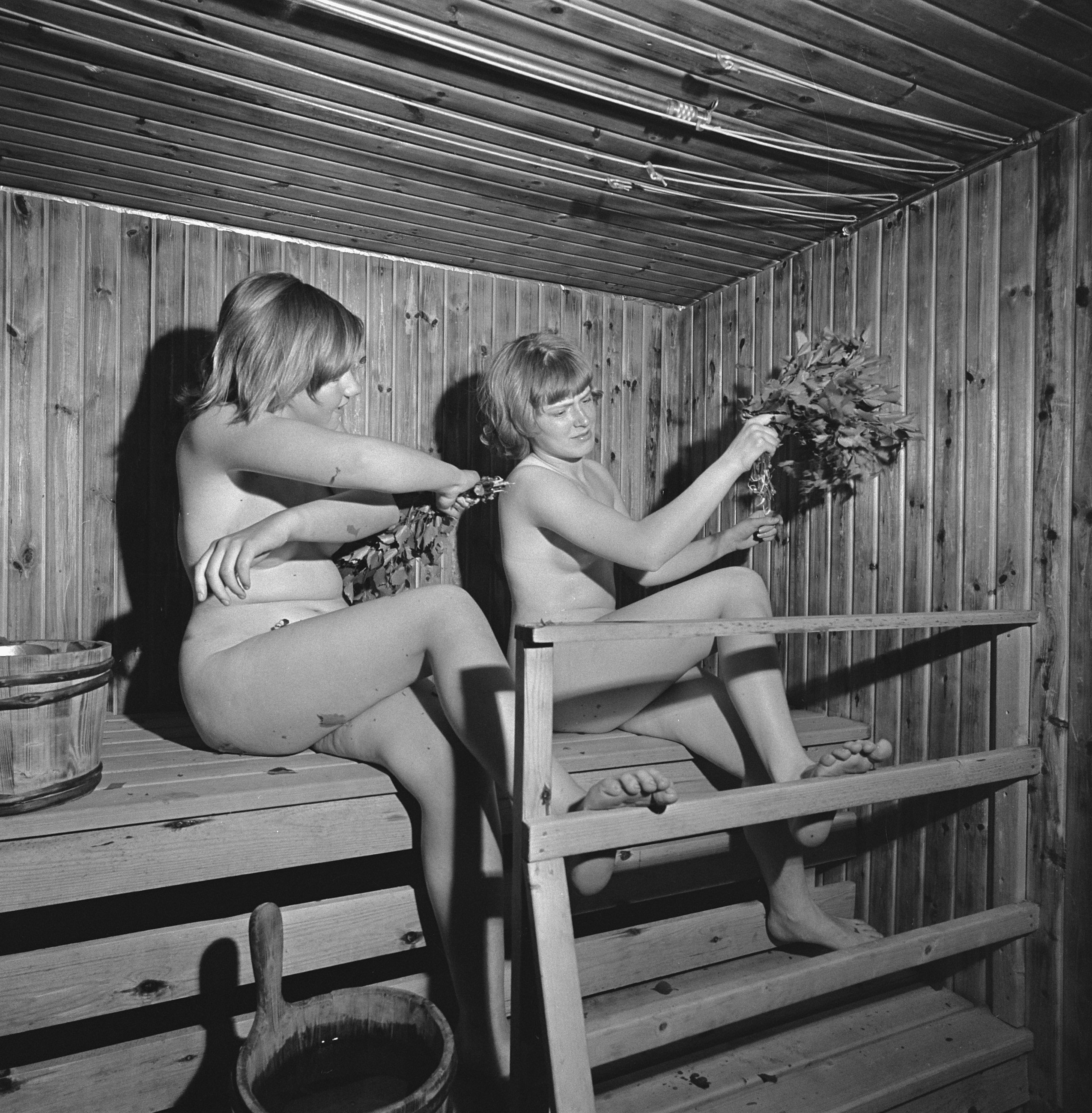
Women in sauna with vihtas in mid-20th century Finland

Western saunas originated in Finland where the oldest known saunas were made from pits dug in a slope in the ground and primarily used as dwellings in winter. The sauna featured a fireplace where stones were heated to a high temperature. Water was thrown on the hot stones to produce steam and to give a sensation of increased heat. This would raise the apparent temperature so high that people could take off their clothes. The first Finnish saunas were always of a type now called savusauna; "smoke sauna". These differed from present-day saunas in that they were operated by heating a pile of rocks called a kiuas by burning large amounts of wood for about 6 to 8 hours and then letting out the smoke before enjoying the löyly, a Finnish term meaning, collectively, both the steam and the heat of a sauna (in the closely related Estonian, the equivalent term is leil). A properly heated "savusauna" yields heat for up to 12 hours.

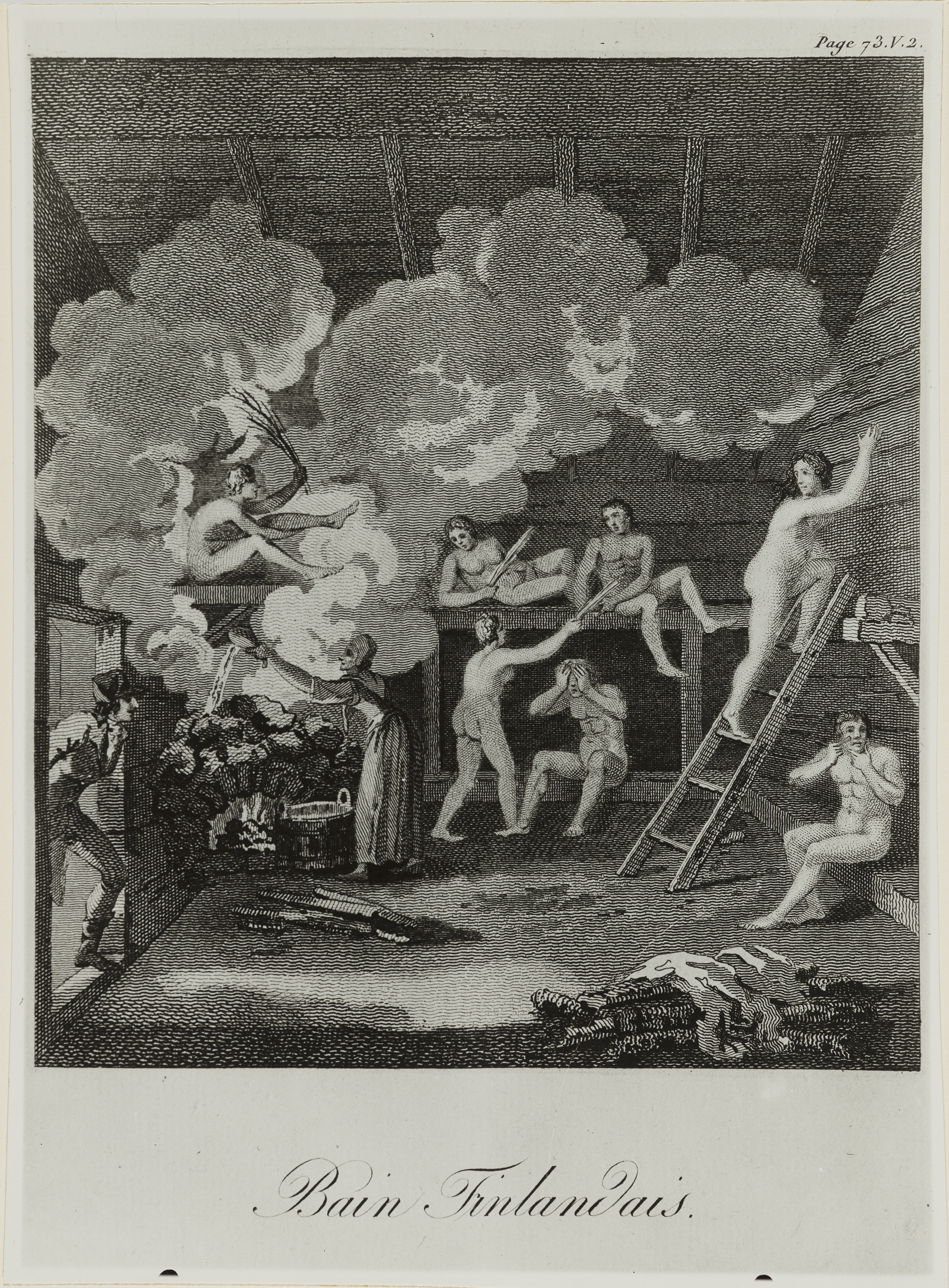
Bain Finlandais. Illustration of a Finnish sauna in 1804 by Giuseppe Acerbi.

As a result of the Industrial Revolution, the sauna evolved to use a wood-burning metal stove with rocks on top, kiuas, with a chimney. Air temperatures averaged around 75–100 °C (167–212 °F) but sometimes exceeded 110 °C (230 °F) in a traditional Finnish sauna. As the Finns migrated to other areas of the globe, they brought their sauna designs and traditions with them. This led to a further evolution of the sauna, including the electric sauna stove, which was introduced in 1938 by Metos Ltd in Vaasa. Although sauna culture is more or less related publicly and internationally to Finnish and Estonian culture, the evolution of the sauna took place around the same time in Finland, Estonia and lesser extent Latvia and Lithuania. Some Finno-Ugric language speaking minorities in Russia can be also included; they all have valued the sauna, its customs and traditions until the present day.

Finnish state and society have helped to boost the image of Finnish sauna across the world. Promotion of finnish sauna was also done during 1936 Summer Olympics in Berlin, when Finnish sauna was set up in Finnish olympic village and it did become one of the top places of interest during the games. The results were big as Germans introduced in German language new word called "die Sauna" and queries how to build saunas or how to use them came from people who were visiting Olympics across the world. 1941 in Finland was published book called "Sauna book" (In Finnish: Sauna kirja), written by Hillari Johannes Viherjuuri, a 323 pages long. German version speaking version called "Finnische Sauna" was shorter and published 1943. Finnish research showed at that time that Sauna must be few thousand years old. Estonians, who have their own sauna culture, did investigate and Estonian daily Postimees in 21.04.1944 called the Sauna book "The high point in the research and propaganda of the Finnish sauna so far". Estonian article also asked a question of what is difference between Finnish sauna and Russian sauna. The reply from Viherjuuri was, that there is no difference when it comes down to small farm one family saunas. Difference comes from the public saunas that were called Russian sauna and spread all over Europe early 20th century as there water vapour made the breathing hard but Finnish sauna has mostly dry air.

The sauna became very popular especially in Scandinavia and the German-speaking regions of Europe after the Second World War: German soldiers had experienced Finnish saunas when the two nations fought together against the Soviet Union (see Continuation War). Saunas were so important to Finnish soldiers that they built them not only in mobile tents but even in bunkers. After the war, the German soldiers brought the custom back to Germany and Austria, where it became popular in the second half of the 20th century. The German sauna culture also became popular in neighbouring countries such as Switzerland, Belgium, the Netherlands, and Luxembourg.

Sauna culture has been registered in the Representative List of the Intangible Cultural Heritage of Humanity under two entries: "Smoke sauna tradition in Võromaa" in 2014 and "Sauna culture in Finland" in 2020.

=== Modern saunas ===
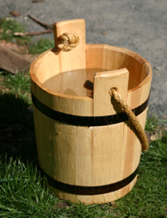
Wooden buckets (kiulu) are used in the sauna.

The sauna known in the Western world today originates from Northern Europe. In Finland, there are built-in saunas in almost every house, including communal saunas in the older apartment buildings; since the 80s, private saunas have often been built into the bathrooms of typical Finnish flats in apartment buildings, sometimes even in student housing. There are also many public saunas in Finland, including Rajaportin Sauna, a sauna located in Tampere, that was first established in 1906 by Hermanni and Maria Lahtinen. Helsinki has a sauna built into one of the gondolas of a Ferris wheel, SkyWheel Helsinki. Unlike in many other countries, Finnish people usually prefer to bathe naked instead of wearing a swimsuit, towel, or any other kind of clothing.

Under many circumstances, temperatures approaching and exceeding 100 °C (212 °F) would be completely intolerable and possibly fatal to a person exposed to them for long periods. Saunas overcome this problem by controlling the humidity. The hottest Finnish saunas have relatively low humidity levels in which steam is generated by pouring water on the hot stones. This allows air temperatures that could evaporate water to be tolerated and even enjoyed for longer periods. Steam baths, such as the hammam, where the humidity approaches 100%, will be set to a much lower temperature of around 50 °C (122 °F) to compensate. The "wet heat" would cause scalding if the temperature were set much higher.

In a typical Finnish sauna, the temperature of the air, the room, and the benches are above the dew point even when water is thrown on the hot stones and vaporized. Thus, they remain dry. In contrast, the sauna bathers are at about 60–80 °C (140–176 °F), which is below the dew point, so that water is condensed on the bathers' skin. This process releases heat and makes the steam feel hot.

Finer control over the perceived temperature can be achieved by choosing a higher-level bench for those wishing for a hotter experience, or a lower-level bench for a more moderate temperature. A good sauna has a relatively small temperature gradient between the various seating levels. Doors need to be kept closed and used quickly to maintain the temperature and to keep the steam inside.

Some North American, Western European, Japanese, Russian, and South African public sport center and gyms include sauna facilities. They may also be present at public and private swimming pools. As an additional facility, a sauna may have one or more jacuzzi. In some spa centers, there are the so-called special "snow rooms," also known as cold saunas or cryotherapy. Operating at a temperature of −110 °C (−166 °F), the user is in the sauna for only about three minutes.

According to the Guinness Book of World Records, the world's largest sauna is the Koi Sauna in the Thermen & Badewelt Sinsheim, Germany. It measures 166 square meters, holds 150 people, and sports a koi aquarium. The title may now belong to Cape East Spa in Haparanda, Sweden, which also holds 150 people but is more spacious.

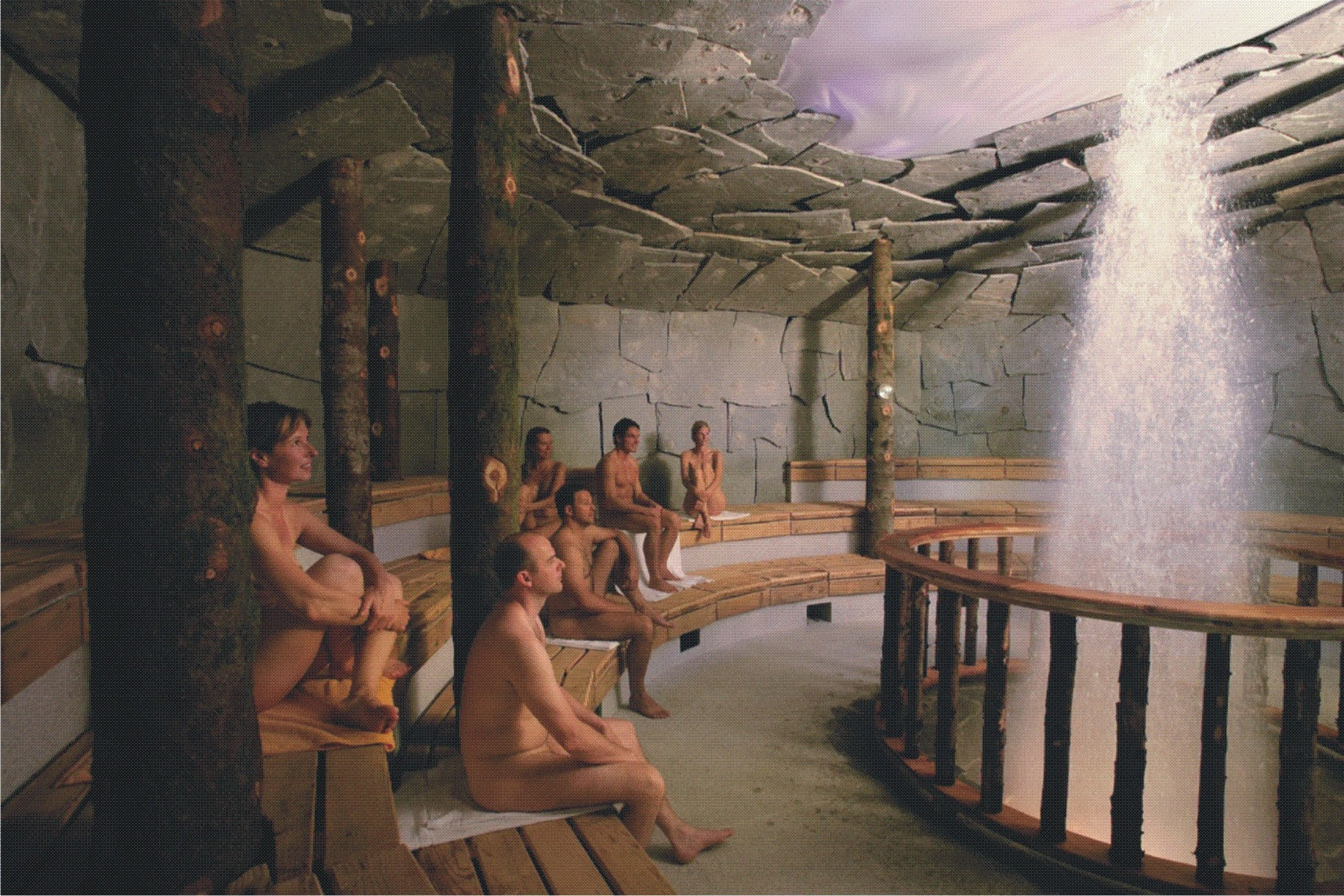
Sauna with geyser at Therme Erding

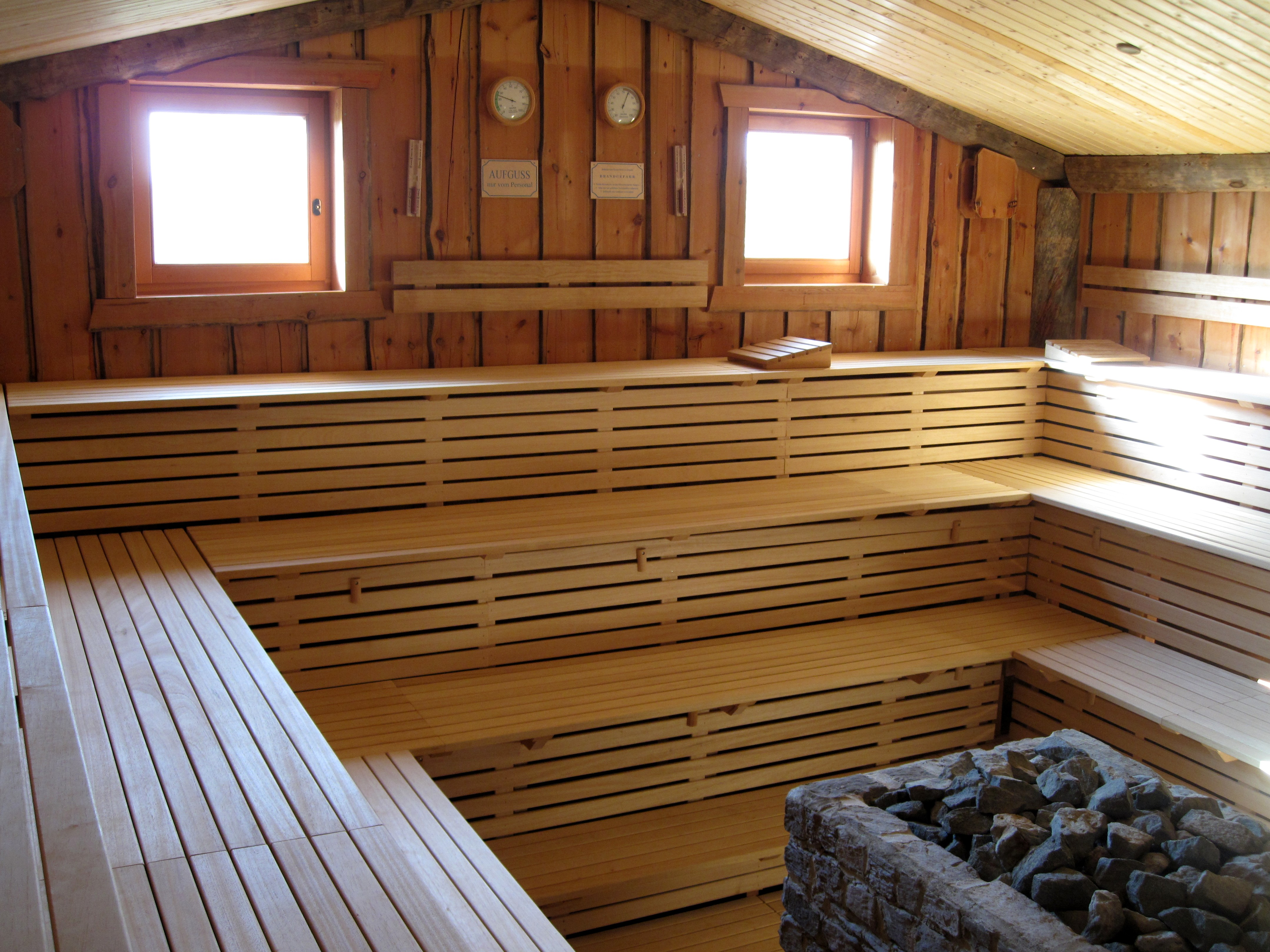
Modern sauna in Templin, Germany

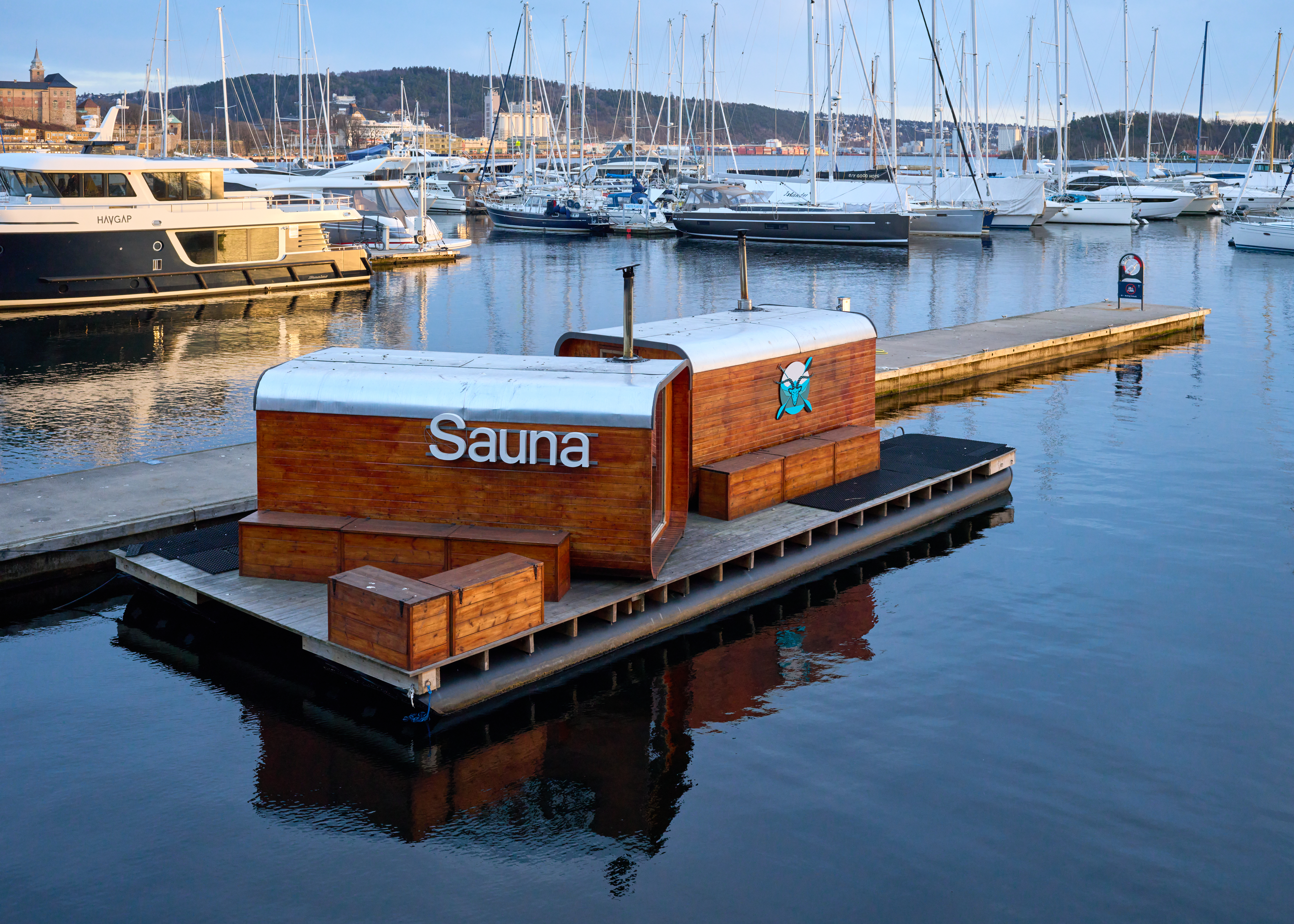
A sauna on a dock in the Tjuvholmen marina of Oslo, Norway

== Use ==
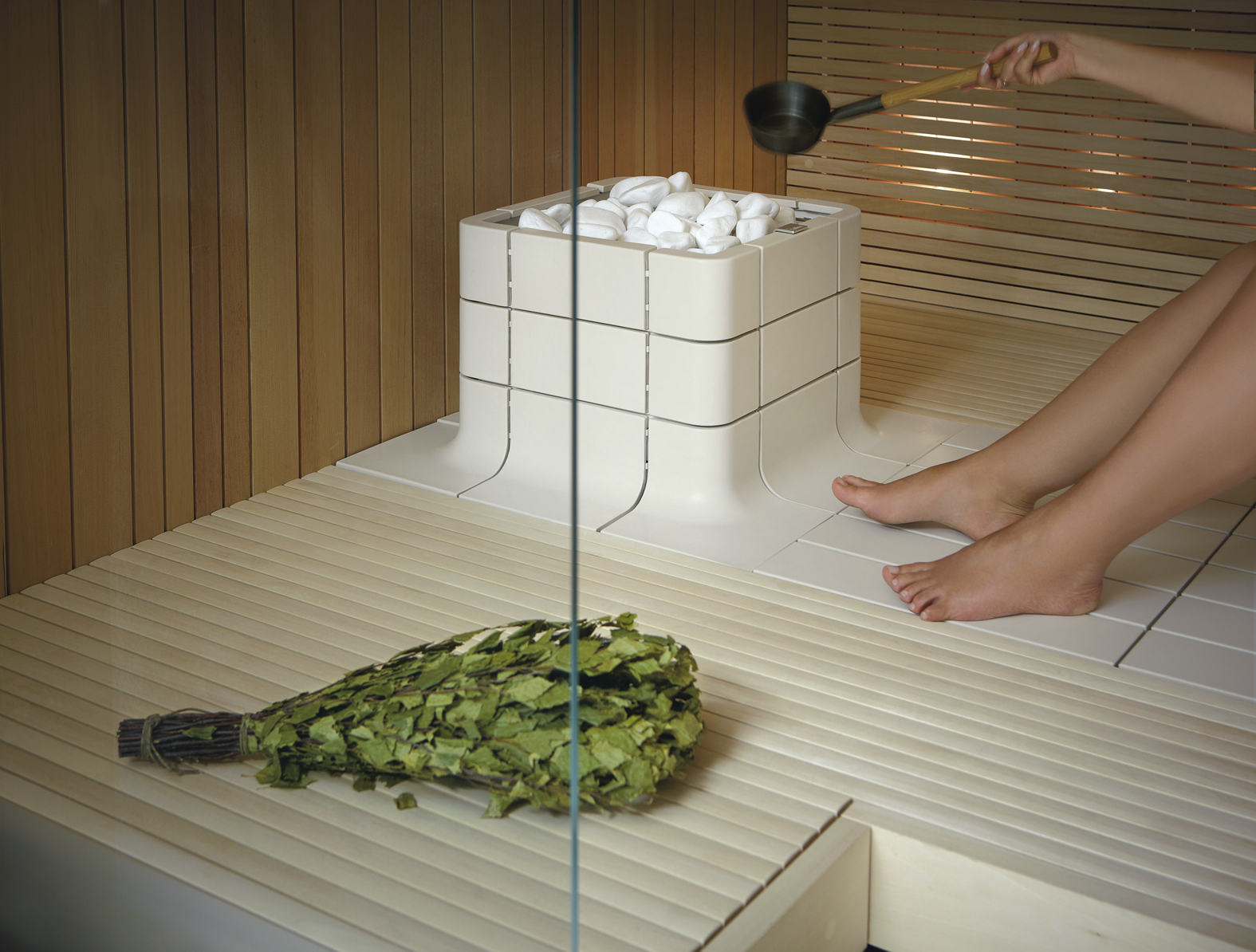
Interior of a modern home sauna in Finland

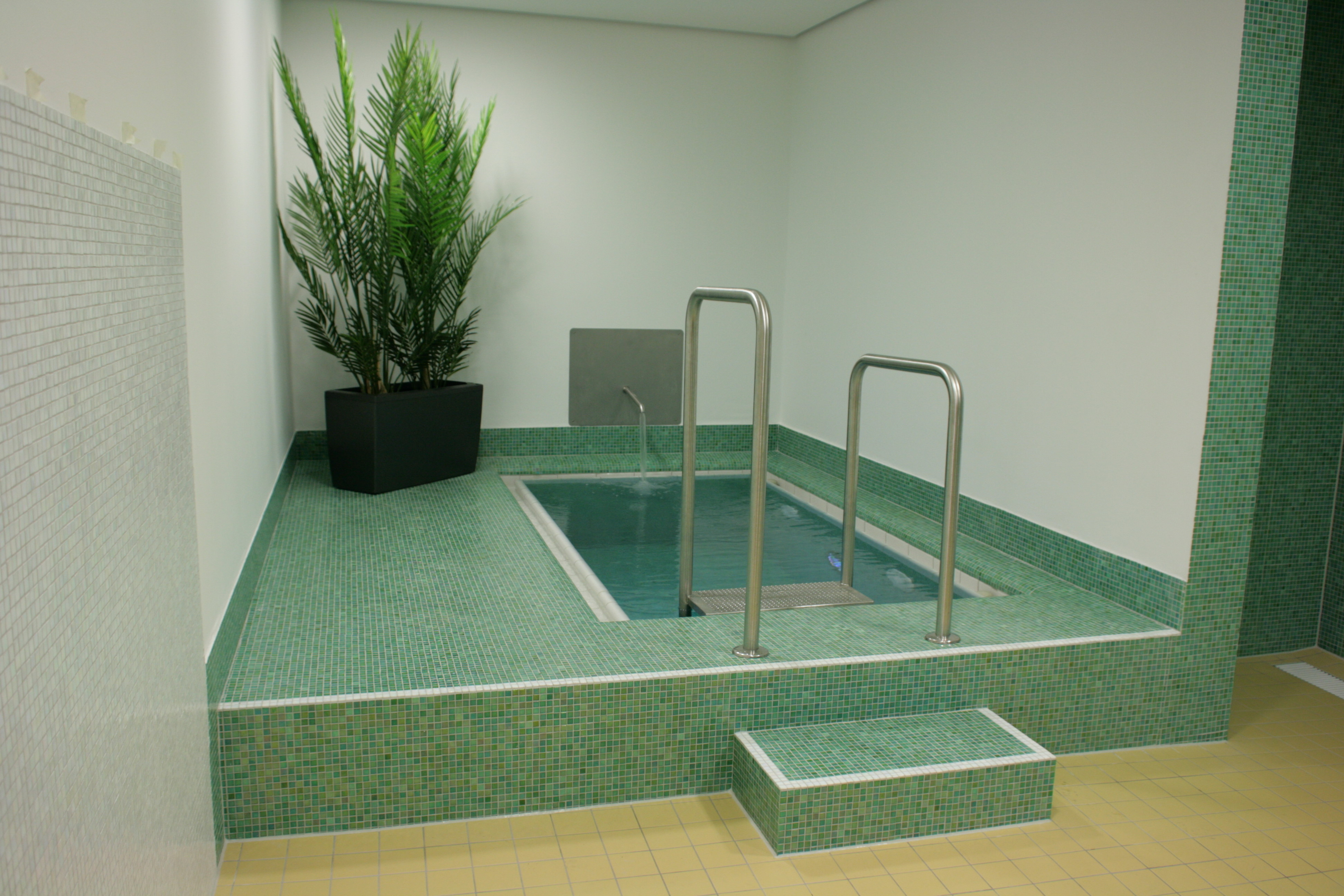
A small pool for cooling down; usually filled with cold water

A modern sauna with an electric stove usually takes about 15–30 minutes to heat up. Some users prefer taking a shower beforehand to speed up perspiration in the sauna. When in the sauna, people often sit on a towel for hygiene and put a towel over their heads if the face feels too hot but the body feels comfortable. In Russia, a felt "banya hat" may be worn to shield the head from the heat; this allows the wearer to increase the heat on the rest of the body. The temperature of one's bath can be controlled via:

- the amount of water thrown on the stove: this increases humidity so that sauna bathers perspire more copiously
- the length of one's stay in the sauna
- positioning: the higher benches are hotter, whereas the lower benches are cooler. Children often sit on the lower benches.

The heat is greatest closest to the stove. Heating from the air is cooler on the lower benches as the hot air rises. The heat given by the steam can be very different in different parts of the sauna. As the steam rises directly upwards, it spreads across the roof and travels out towards the corners, where it is then forced downwards. Consequently, the heat of fresh steam may sometimes be felt most strongly in the furthest corners of the sauna. Users increase the duration and the heat gradually over time as they adapt to the sauna. When pouring water onto the stove, it cools down the rocks, but carries more heat into the air via advection, making the sauna warmer.

Perspiration is the result of autonomic responses trying to cool the body. Users are advised to leave the sauna if the heat becomes unbearable, or if they feel faint or ill. Some saunas have a thermostat to adjust the temperature, but the owner of the sauna and the other bathers expect to be consulted before changes are made. The sauna stove and rocks are very hot—one must stay well clear of them to avoid burns, particularly when water is thrown on the rocks, which creates an immediate blast of steam. Combustibles on, or near the stove have been known to cause fires. Contact lenses dry out in the heat. Jewelry or anything metallic, including glasses, will get hot in the sauna and can cause discomfort or burning.

The temperature on different parts of the body can be adjusted by shielding one's body with a towel. Shielding the face with a towel has been found to reduce the perception of heat. Some may wish to put an additional towel or a special cap over the head to avoid dryness. Few people can sit directly in front of the stove without feeling too hot from the radiant heat, but this may not be reflected in their overall body temperature. As the person's body is often the coolest object in a sauna room, steam will condense into water on the skin; this can be confused with perspiration.

Cooling down by immersing oneself in water (in a shower, lake, or pool) is a part of the sauna cycle and is as important as the heating. However, healthy people and heart patients alike should take some precautions if plunging into very cold water straight after coming from the hot room, as the rapid cooling of the body produces considerable circulatory stress. It is considered good practice to take a few moments after exiting a sauna before entering a cold plunge and to enter a plunge pool or a lake by stepping into it gradually, rather than immediately immersing oneself fully. In summer, a session is often started with a cool shower.

In some countries, the closest and most convenient access to a sauna is at a gymnasium. Some public pools, major sports centers, and resorts also contain a sauna. Therapeutic sauna sessions are often carried out in conjunction with physiotherapy or hydrotherapy; these are gentle exercises that do not exacerbate symptoms.

=== Temperature ===
Depending on the purpose or reason for using the sauna, temperatures can differ dramatically in both dry and wet saunas. At competition or world-record level, 110 °C (230 °F) is seen as the upper limit. In 2003, the five-time world champion Timo Kaukonen lasted 16 minutes at the World Sauna Championships, setting a world record in the process. The World Sauna Championships were stopped in 2010 after two competitors collapsed, with Vladimir Ladyzhensky later dying in hospital. These temperatures are seen as extreme and likely be detrimental to health, but Finnish organisers suggested these extreme heat levels weren't uncommon in their country.

There have been studies to try and find the optimal temperature for sauna use, but very few studies vary temperature to measure health outcomes. For pregnant women and those with health complications, lower temperatures or no use at all is advised. For comfort, for example a spa setting, temperatures are often range from 70–80 °C (158–176 °F). Health benefits are often reached towards the top end of the advisory range of temperatures, around 90 °C (194 °F) or slightly above. One such study by Bryan Johnson suggested the most important metric isn't how hot the sauna is, but the core body temperature the person reaches during a sauna session. The reasoning behind this is the body's increase in heat shock proteins at high temperatures, which are said to have numerous benefits on a cellular level.

== Health effects ==
=== Potential health benefits ===
There has been widespread research into the health benefits and risks that come from sauna usage; most studies have focused on the Finnish sauna specifically. Sauna bathing leads to mild heat stress, which activates heat shock proteins responsible for repairing misfolded proteins, promoting longevity as well as protection against muscle atrophy and chronic illness.

There is evidence that long-term exposure to Finnish-style sauna is correlated with a reduced risk of sudden cardiac death; and that risk reduction increases with duration and frequency of use; this reduction is more pronounced when sauna bathing is combined with exercise, compared with either of these practices alone. Tentative evidence supports that the heat stress from saunas is associated with reduced blood pressure and arterial stiffness, and therefore also decrease the risk of cardiovascular disease. These benefits are more pronounced in persons with low cardiovascular function. Evidence exists for the benefit of sauna on people with heart failure. Frequent Finnish-style sauna usage (4–7 times per week) is associated with a decreased risk of neurovascular diseases, including Alzheimer's disease and stroke, relative to those individuals who used sauna once per week. Individuals suffering from musculoskeletal disorders could have symptomatic improvement from sauna, and it could be beneficial for glaucoma. It also is associated with a reduced risk and symptom relief from respiratory illness. Weight loss in obese people and improvement of appetite loss present with normal body weight can also be achievable with sauna bathing.

Evidence for the use of sauna for depression or skin disorders is insufficient, but the frequency of sauna sessions is correlated with a diminished risk of developing psychosis, and it might be beneficial for psoriasis. Current evidence has suggested that sweating out microplastics is not possible, and therefore until recently the sauna was not seen as a potential way to reduce microplastic concentration in the body. Research from Bryan Johnson however recorded extensive drops in microplastics in both blood and semen measurements during a period of extensive sauna testing, showing a drop of 85% in microplastics during that period.

=== Potential health risks ===
Sauna bathing coupled with alcohol consumption or dehydration increases the risk of sudden death; the use of narcotic drugs, such as cocaine, also increases the risk. Being severely obese, having high blood pressure, or being diabetic all serve as reasons to decrease the duration of sauna sessions. Individuals prone to postural hypotension or severe valvular heart disease should use a sauna cautiously to reduce the risk of a drop in blood pressure. In people with cardiovascular disease, sauna usage is generally safe, as long as their condition is stable. However, sauna bathing is contraindicated in persons with unstable angina and severe aortic stenosis. A one-year study in Finland showed that only 67 (2.6%) of sudden deaths in saunas were non-accidental, mostly due to coronary heart disease.

Pregnant women can use saunas as long as their core temperature does not exceed 39.0 °C (102.2 °F), as this may be teratogenic.

One study has found that genital heat stress from frequent sauna sessions could cause male infertility. (Note: Minna Hannuksela and Samer Ellahham state the opposite, namely that sauna bathing does not affect fertility.) Biohackers have started to use ice packs on their testicles while in the sauna as a way of minimizing this risk factor.

== Technologies ==
Today there is a wide variety of sauna options. Heat sources include wood, electricity, gas, and other unconventional methods such as solar power. There are wet saunas, dry saunas, infrared saunas, smoke saunas, and steam saunas. There are two main types of stoves: continuous heating and heat storage type. Continuously heating stoves have a small heat capacity and can be heated up on a fast on-demand basis, whereas a heat storage stove has a large heat (stone) capacity and can take much longer to heat.

=== Heat storage-type ===
==== Smoke sauna ====
Smoke sauna (Finnish savusauna, Estonian suitsusaun, Võro savvusann) is one of the earliest forms of the sauna. It is simply a room containing a pile of rocks but without a chimney. A fire is lit directly under the rocks and after a while, the fire is extinguished. The heat is retained in the rocks, and the earlier fire becomes the main source for heating the sauna. Following this process, the ashes and embers are removed from the hearth, the benches and floor are cleaned, and the room is allowed to air out and freshen for some time. The smoke deposits a layer of soot on every surface, so if the benches and back-rests can be removed while the fire is alight the amount of cleaning necessary is reduced. Depending on the size of the stove and the airing time, the temperature may be low, about 60 °C (140 °F), while the humidity is relatively high. The tradition almost died out in Finland but was revived by enthusiasts in the 1980s. These are still used in present-day Finland by some enthusiasts, but usually only on special occasions such as Christmas, New Year's, Easter, and juhannus (Midsummer). Smoke saunas are popular in the southern Estonia and smoke sauna tradition in Võrumaa was added into UNESCO Intangible Cultural Heritage Lists in 2014.

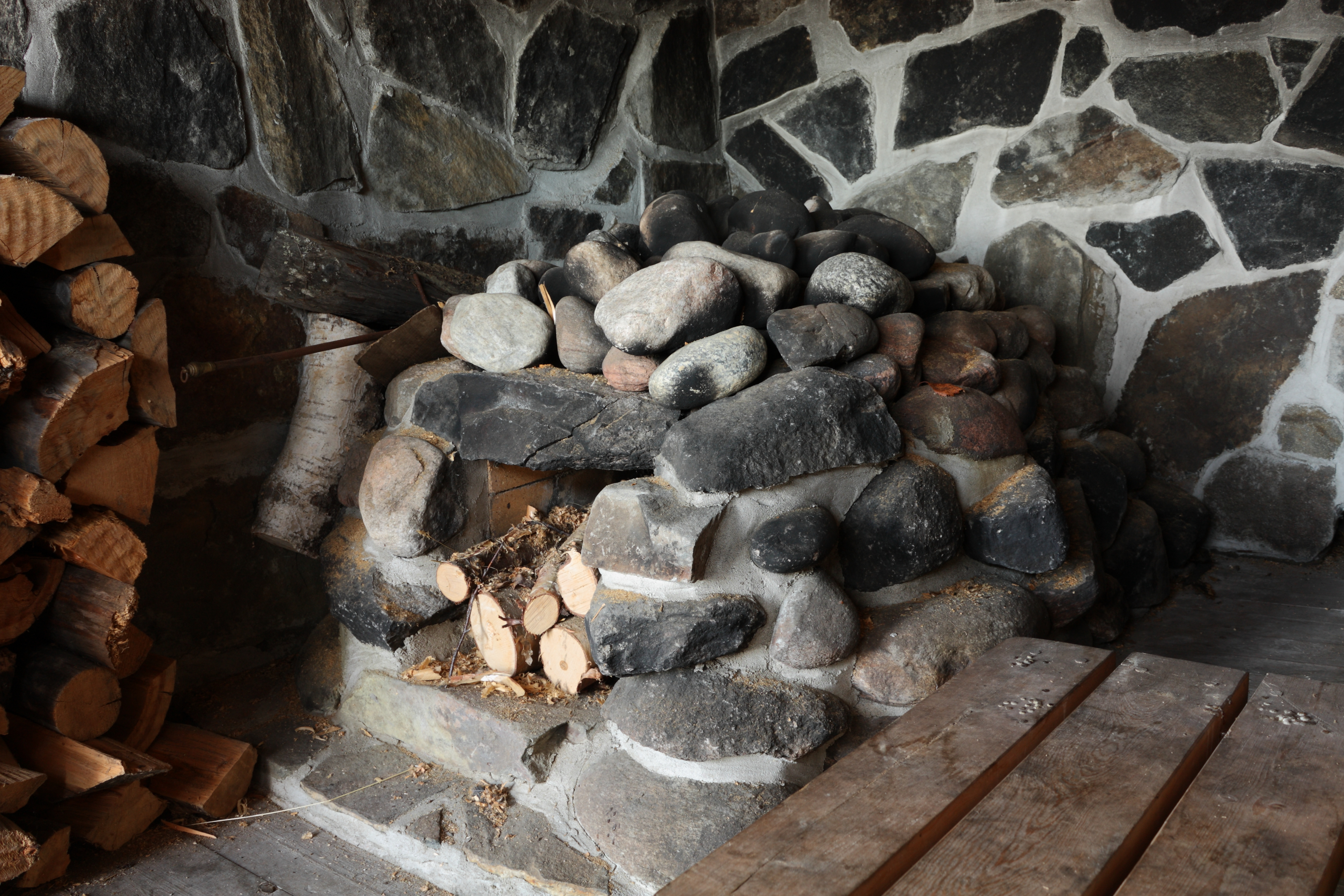
Smoke sauna stove

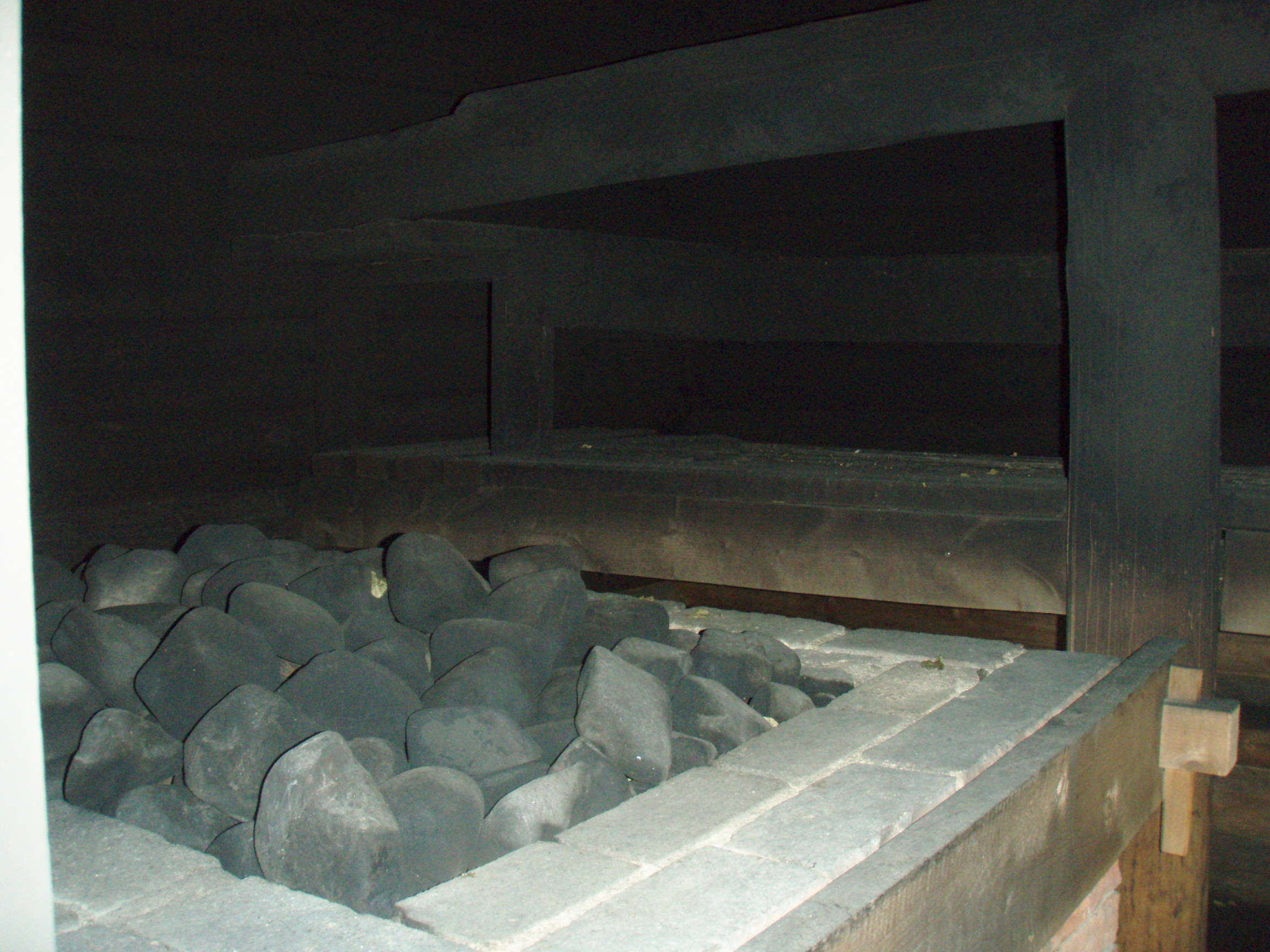
Smoke sauna stones

==== Heat storage-sauna ====
The smoke-sauna stove is also used with a sealed stone compartment and chimney (a heat storage stove) which eliminates the smoke odor and eye irritation of the smoke sauna. A heat storage stove does not give up much heat in the sauna before bathing since the stone compartment has an insulated lid. When the sauna bath is started and the löyly shutter opens a soft warmth flows into the otherwise relatively cold (60 °C; 140 °F) sauna. This heat is soft and clean because, thanks to combustion, the stove stones glow red, even white-hot, and are free of dust at the same time. When bathing the heat-storage sauna will become as hot as a continuous fire-type sauna (80–110 °C; 176–230 °F) but more humid. The stones are usually durable heatproof and heat-retaining peridotite. The upper part of the stove is often insulated with rock wool and firebricks. Heat-storing stoves are also found with electric heating, with similar service but no need to maintain a fire.

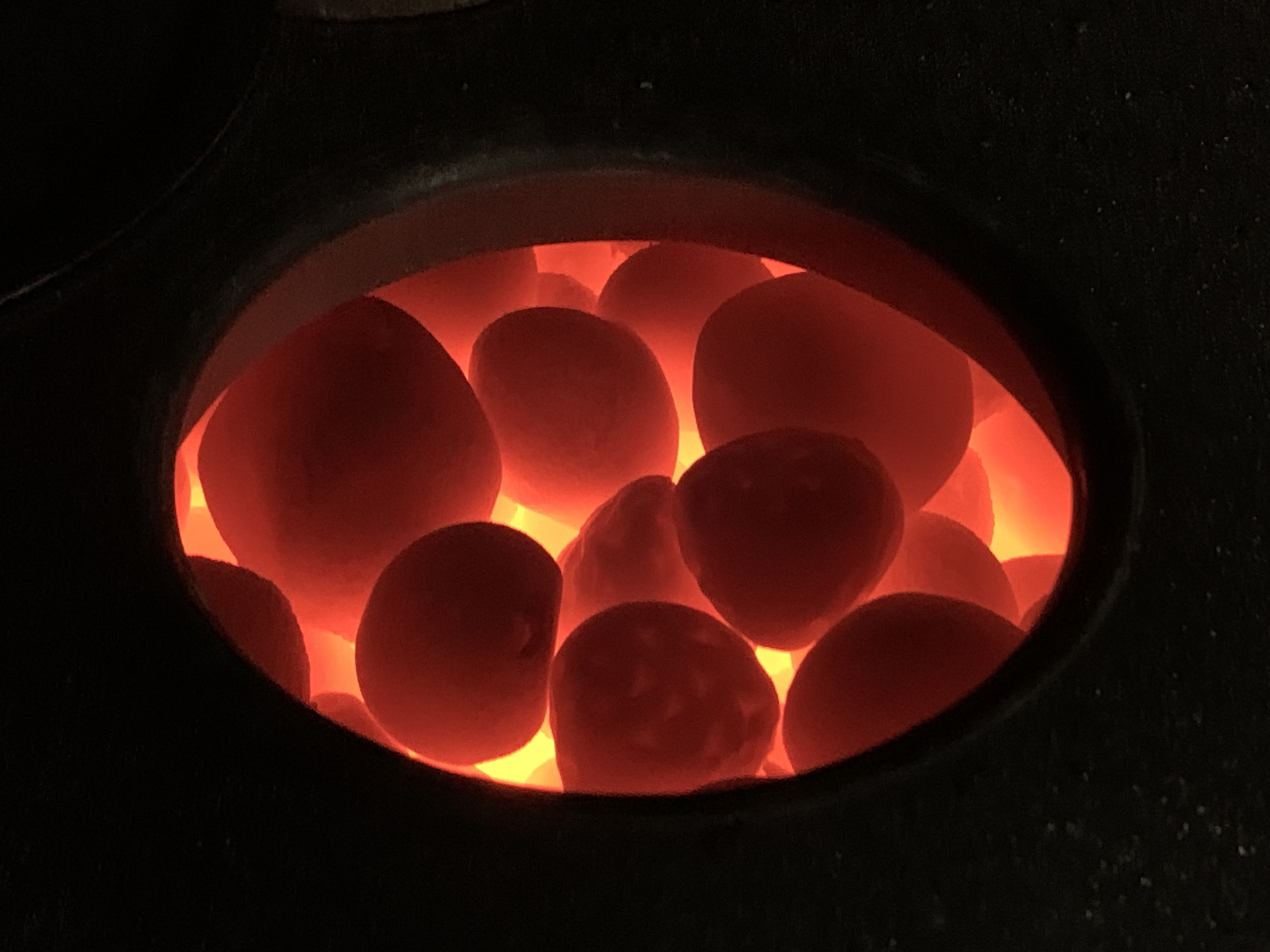
Heat storage type sauna stove stone compartment

=== Continuous heat-type ===
==== Continuous fire sauna ====
A continuous fire stove, instead of stored heat, is a relatively recent invention. There is a firebox and a smokestack, and stones are placed in a compartment directly above the firebox. It takes a shorter time to heat than the heat-storage sauna, about one hour. A fire-heated sauna requires manual labor in the form of maintaining the fire during bathing; the fire can also be seen as a hazard.

Fire-heated saunas are common in cottages, where the extra work of maintaining the fire is not a problem.

==== Electric stove sauna ====
The most common modern sauna types are those with electric stoves. The stones are heated up and kept on temperature using electric heating elements. There is a thermostat and a timer (typically with eight hours' maximum delay time, followed by one hour's continuous heating time) on the stove. This type of heating is generally used only in urban saunas.

== Other sweat bathing facilities ==
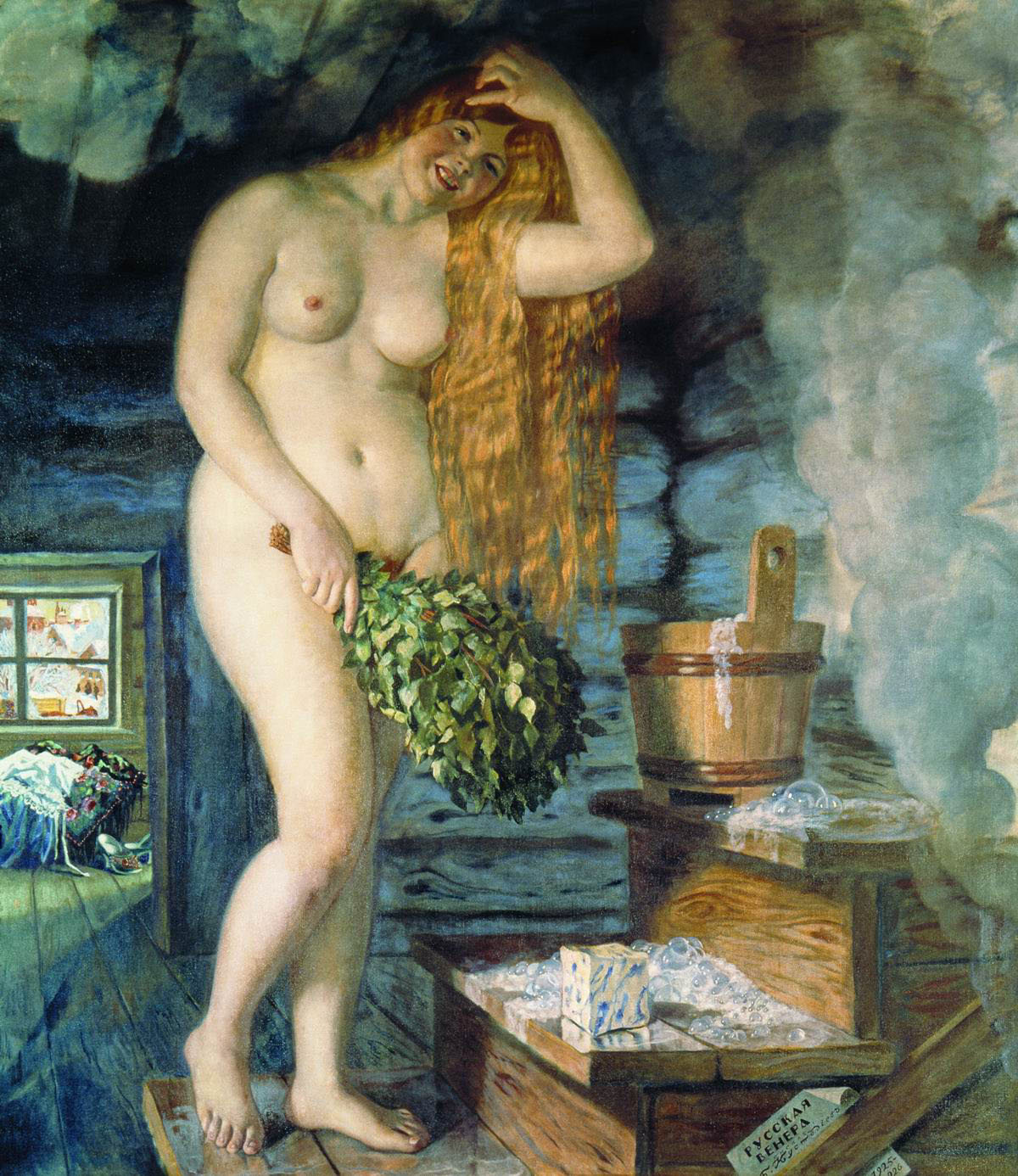
Depiction in the mid-1920s of a rural banya by Russian artist Boris Kustodiev: Russian Venus (armed with birch besom)

Many cultures have sweat baths, though some have more spiritual uses while others are purely secular. In Ancient Rome there was the thermae or balneae (from Greek βαλανεῖον balaneîon), traits of which survive in the "Turkish" or Islamic hammam and in the Victorian Turkish bath (which uses only hot dry air). In the Americas there is the Nahuatl (Aztec) temāzcalli Nahuatl pronunciation: [temaːsˈkalːi], Maya zumpul-ché, and the Mixtec Ñihi; in Canada and the United States, a number of First Nations and Native American cultures have various kinds of spiritual sweat lodges (Lakota: inipi, Anishinaabemowin madoodiswan). In Europe we find the Estonian saun (almost identical to the Finnish sauna), Russian banya, Latvian pirts, the European Jews' shvitz, and the Swedish bastu. In Asia the Japanese Mushi-Buro and the Korean jjimjilbang. The Karo people of Indonesia have the oukup. In some parts of Africa, there is the sifutu.

== Around the world ==
Although cultures in all corners of the world have imported and adapted the sauna, many of the traditional customs have not survived the journey. Today, public perception of saunas, sauna "etiquette" and sauna customs vary hugely from country to country. In many countries sauna going is a recent fashion and attitudes towards saunas are changing, while in others traditions have survived over generations.

=== Asia ===
In Iran, most gyms, hotels, and almost all public swimming pools have indoor saunas. It is very common for swimming pools to have two saunas which are known in Persian as سونای خشک "dry sauna" and سونای بخار "steam sauna", with the dry type customarily boasting a higher temperature. A cold-water pool (and/or more recently a cold Jacuzzi) is almost always accompanied and towels are usually provided. Adding therapeutic or relaxing essential oils to the rocks is common. In Iran, unlike Finland, sitting in a sauna is mostly seen as part of the spa/club culture, rather than a bathing ritual. It is most usually perceived as a means for relaxation or detoxification (through perspiration). Having a sauna room on private property is considered a luxury rather than a necessity. Public saunas are segregated and nudity is prohibited.

In Japan, many saunas exist at sports centers and public bathhouses (sentō). The saunas are almost always gender separated, often required by law, and nudity is a required part of proper sauna etiquette. While right after World War II, public bathhouses were commonplace in Japan, the number of customers dwindled as more people were able to afford houses and apartments equipped with their own private baths as the nation became wealthier. As a result, many sentōs have added more features such as saunas to survive.

In Korea, saunas are essentially public bathhouses. Various names are used to describe them, such as the smaller mogyoktang, outdoor oncheon, and the elaborate jjimjilbang. The word "sauna" is used a lot for its 'English appeal'; however, it does not strictly refer to the original Fennoscandian steam rooms that have become popular throughout the world. The konglish word sauna (사우나) usually refers to bathhouses with Jacuzzis, hot tubs, showers, steam rooms, and related facilities.

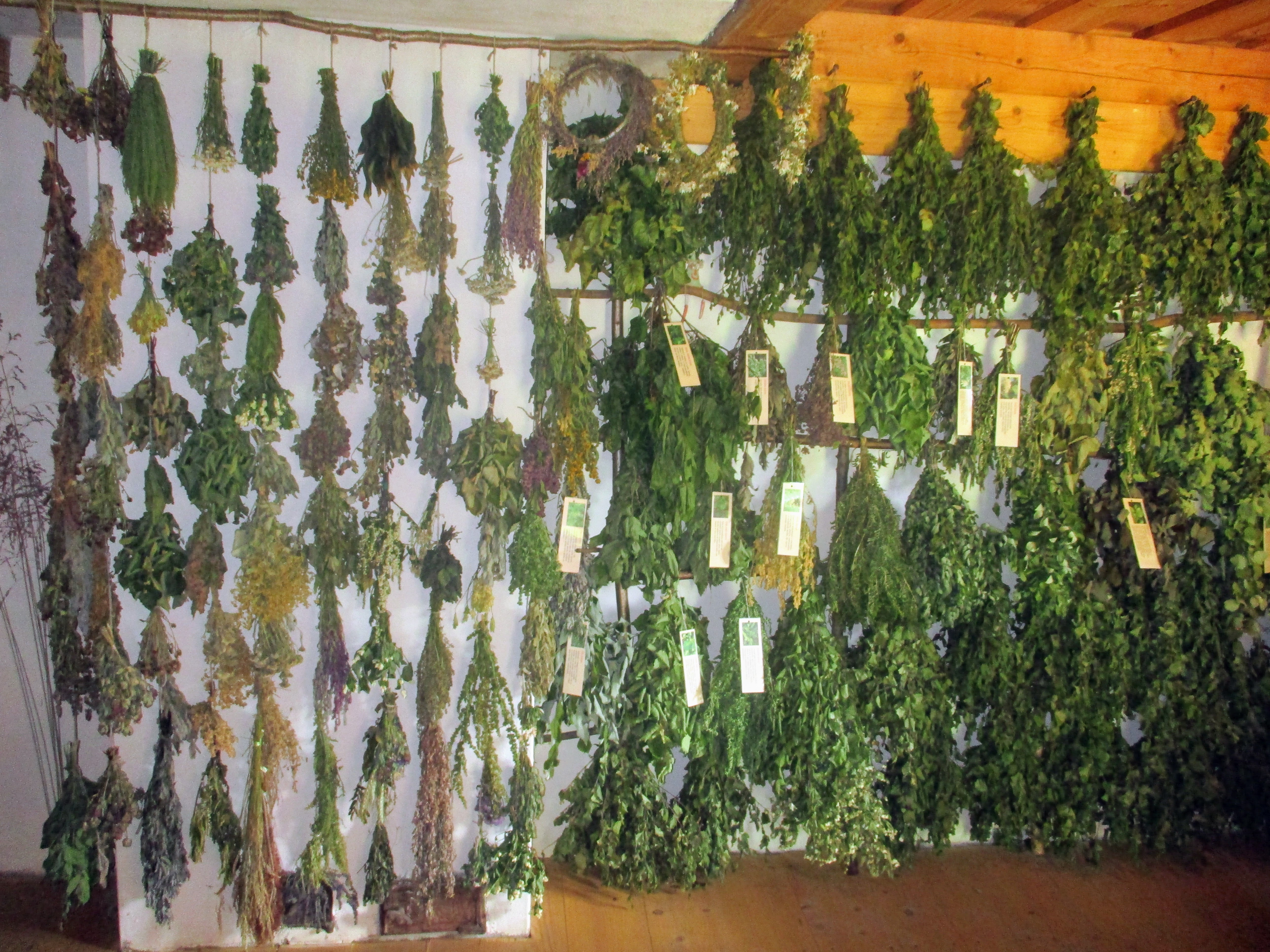
Sauna whisks and herbal teas

In Laos, herbal steam sauna or hom yaa in Lao, is very popular, especially with women and is available in every village. Many women apply yogurt or a paste blend based on tamarind on their skin as a beauty treatment. The sauna is always heated by wood fire and herbs are added either directly to the boiling water or steam jet in the room. The sitting lounge is mixed gender but the steam rooms are gender separated. Bael fruit tea known in lao as muktam tea is usually served.

=== Australia and Canada ===
In Australia and Canada, saunas are found mainly in hotels, swimming pools, and health clubs and if used by both men and women, nudity is often forbidden, even if implicitly. In gyms or health clubs with separate male and female change rooms, nudity is permitted; however, members are usually asked to shower before using the sauna and to sit on a towel.

In Canada, saunas have increasingly become a fixture of cottage culture, which shares many similarities with its Finnish counterpart (mökki).

=== Europe ===
==== Nordic and Baltic ====
===== Finland and Estonia =====
A sauna session can be a social affair in which the participants disrobe and sit or recline in temperatures typically between 70 and 100 °C (158 and 212 °F). This induces relaxation and promotes sweating. People use a bundle of birch twigs with fresh leaves (Finnish: vihta or vasta; Estonian: viht), to slap the skin and create further stimulation of the pores and cells.

In Finland and Estonia, the sauna is an important part of daily life, and families bathe together in the home sauna. There are at least 2 million saunas in Finland according to official registers. The Finnish Sauna Society believes the number can be as high as 3.2 million saunas (population 5.5 million). Many Finns take at least one a week, and much more when they visit their summer cottage in the countryside. Here the pattern of life tends to revolve around the sauna, and a nearby lake used for cooling off.

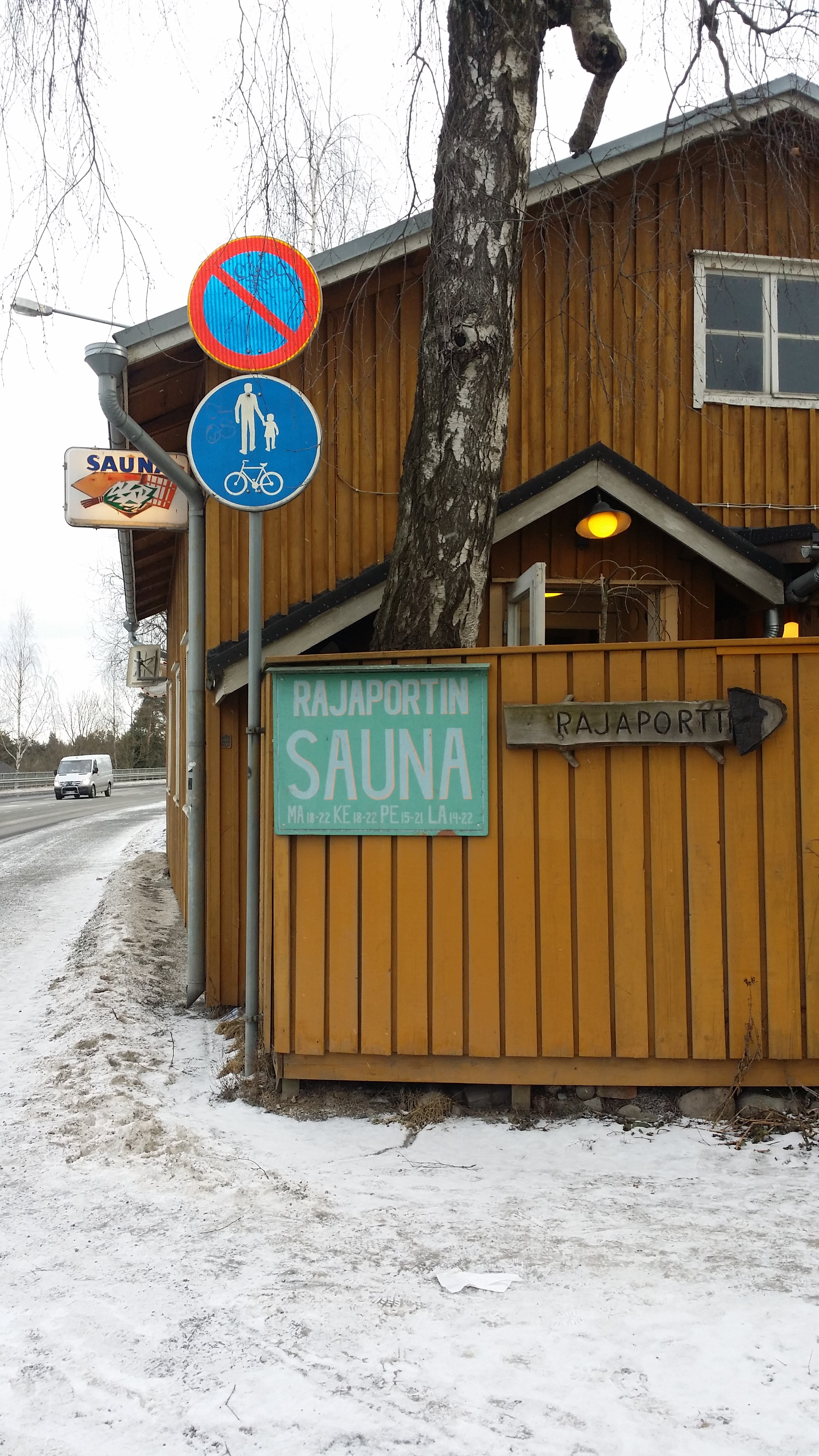
Rajaportin sauna in Tampere, the oldest working public sauna in Finland

Kotiharjun sauna, the oldest working public sauna of Helsinki

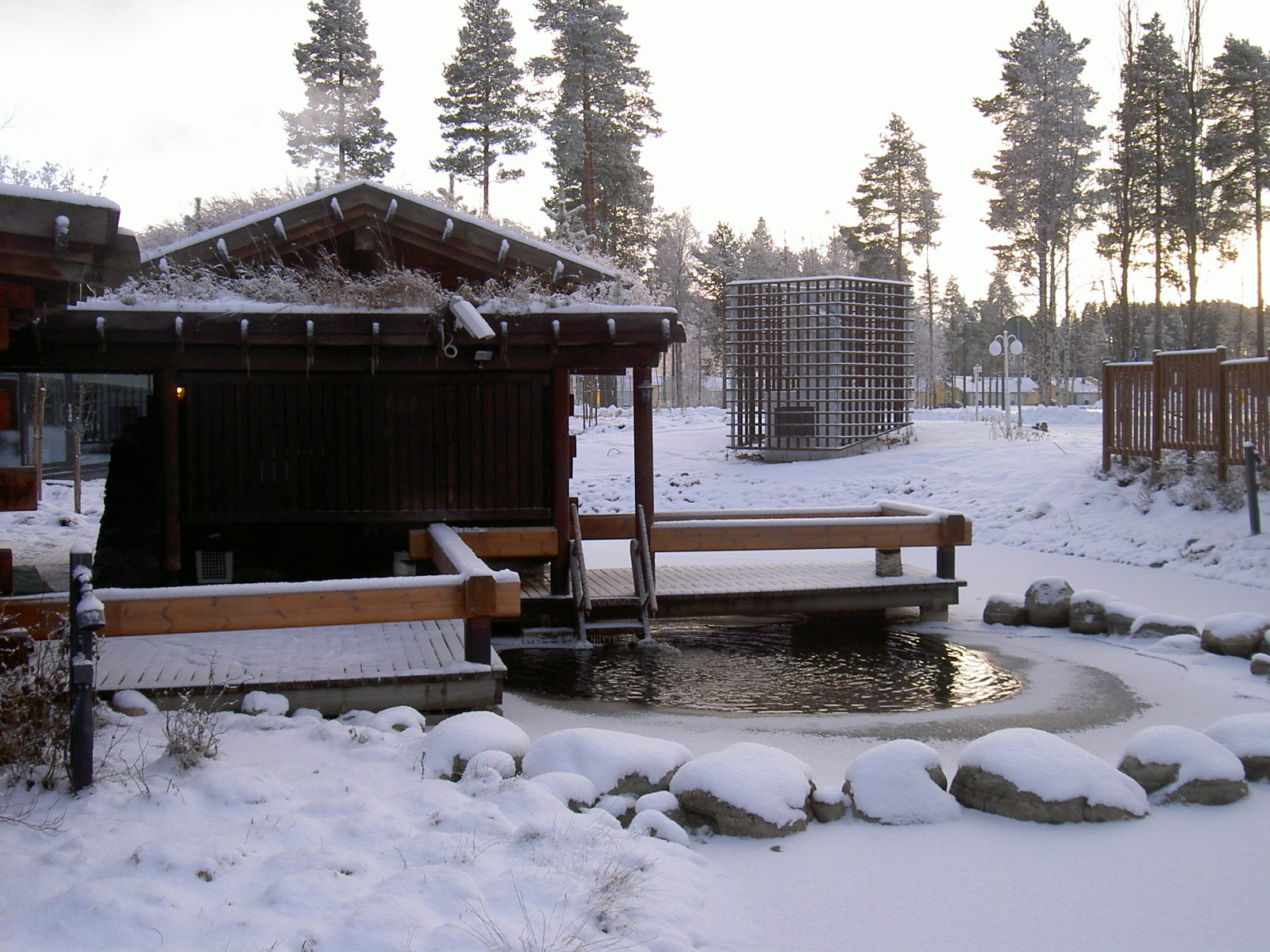
A modern sauna in Finland

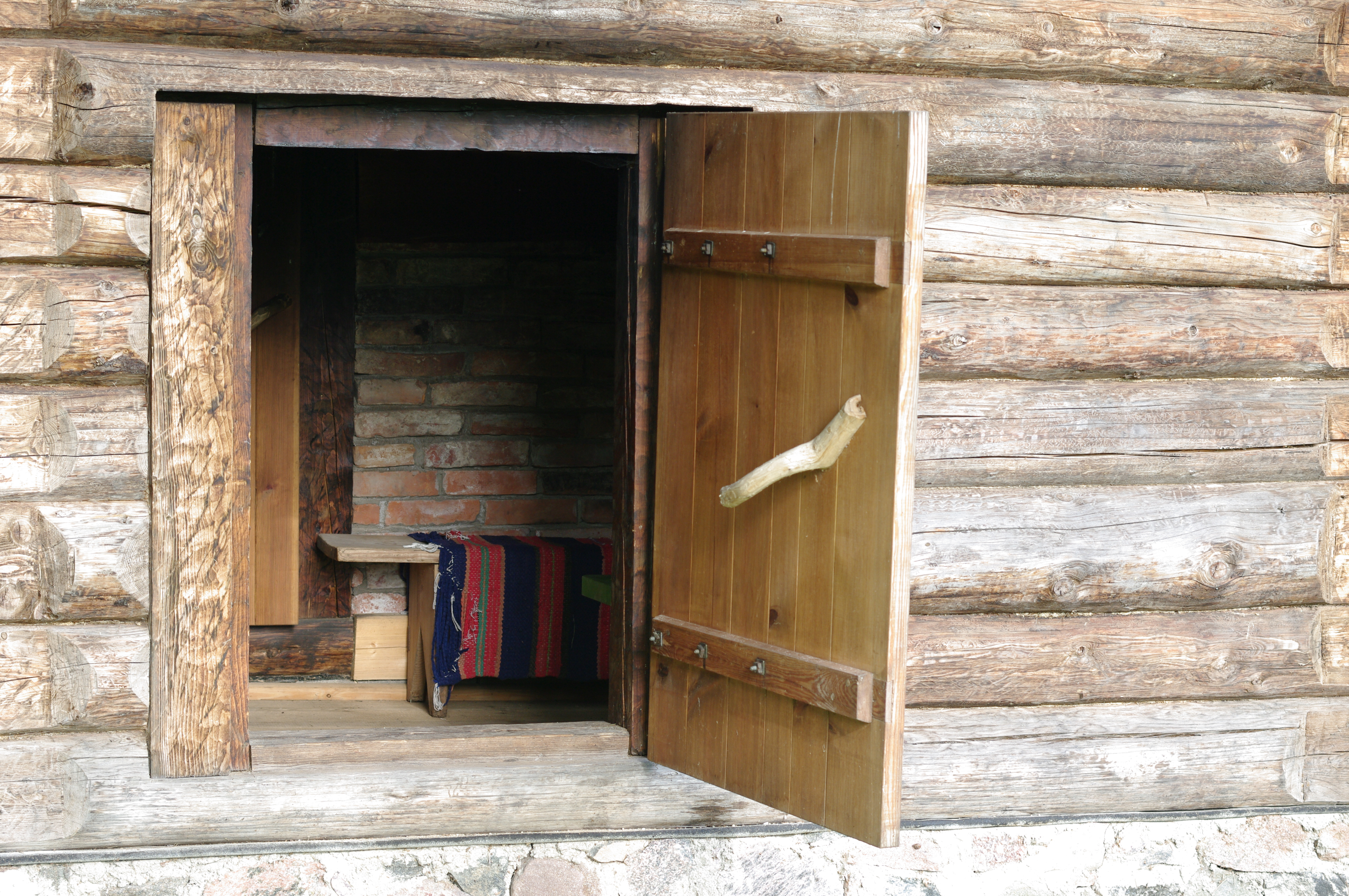
A sauna in Estonia

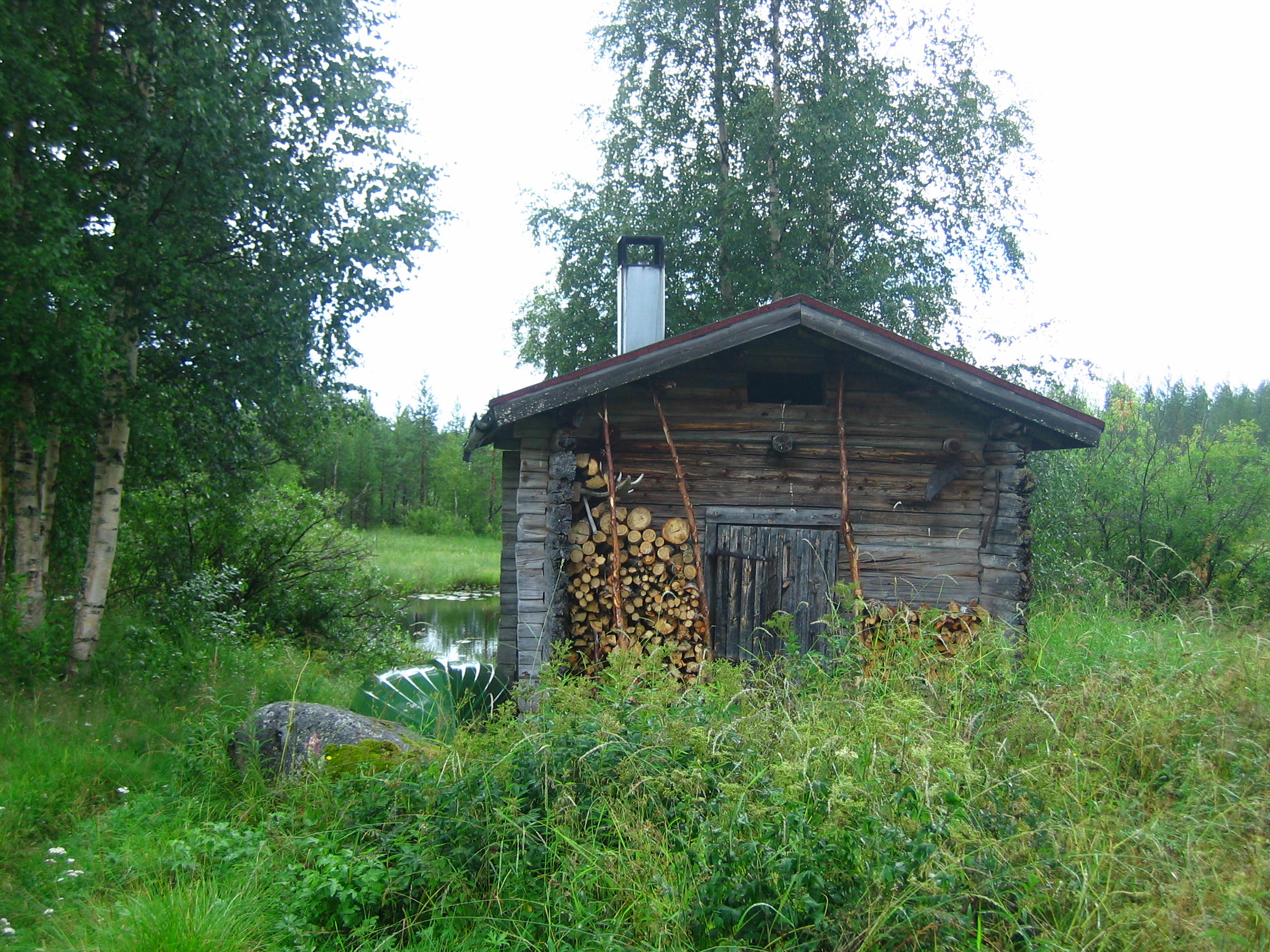
Sauna building in Finland

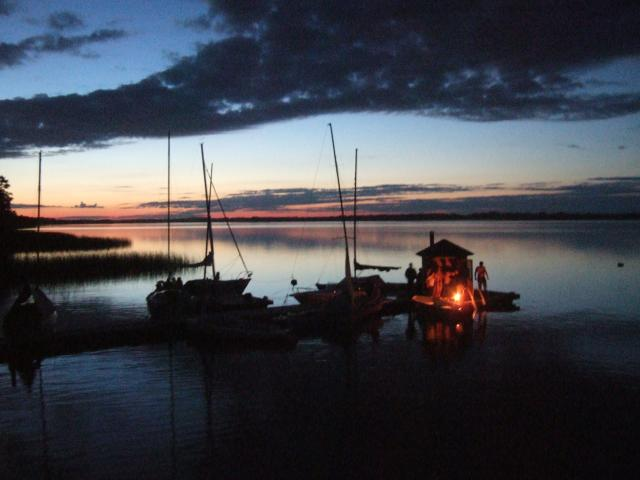
Estonian sauna on a lake

Sauna traditions in Estonia are almost identical to Finland as saunas have traditionally held a central role in the life of an individual. Ancient Estonians believed saunas were inhabited by spirits. In folk tradition, the sauna was not only the place where one washed but also used as the place where brides were ceremoniously washed, where women gave birth, and the place where the dying made their final bed. The folk tradition related to the Estonian sauna is mostly identical to that surrounding the Finnish sauna. On New Year's Eve, a sauna would be held before midnight to cleanse the body and spirit for the upcoming year.

===== Latvia and Lithuania =====
In Lithuanian, bathhouse or sauna is pirtis; in Latvian, it is pirts. Both countries have long bathhouse traditions, dating back to the pagan times.

The 13th-century bathhouses in the Grand Duchy of Lithuania were mentioned in the Hypatian Codex and Chronicon terrae Prussiae, as they were practised by the Lithuanian dukes. Livonian Chronicle of Henry describes a bathhouse built around 1196 near the pier on the bank of Daugava river. The chronicle also mentions the year 1215 baths of the Latgalian ruler Tālivaldis which were built in Trikāta. These baths are also mentioned in the Livonian Rhymed Chronicle. Sauna had a considerable role in the pagan traditions of the Baltic people. In the 17th century, Matthäus Prätorius described various rituals the Baltic people practiced in the sauna. For example, sauna was a primary place for women to give birth and rites would be performed for the Baltic goddess Laima. At that time, sauna traditions were similar in Aukštaitija, Samogitia, Latgale, Semigallia as well as some West Slavic lands. In 1536, Vilnius gained a royal privilege to build public bathhouses, and by the end of the 16th century, the city already had 60 of them with a countless number of private ones. In Latvian lands, bathhouses became particularly popular in the 19th century.

The contemporary Baltic sauna is similar to others in the north-eastern part of Europe: it varies according to personal preference but is typically around 55–70 °C (131–158 °F), humidity 60–90%, with steam being generated by pouring water on the hot stones. Traditionally, birch twigs (Lithuanian: vanta; Latvian: slota) are the most common, but oak or linden are used too. Sauna enthusiasts also make twigs from other trees and plants, including nettle and juniper. Dry air sauna of 80–110 °C (176–230 °F) and very low humidity became popular relatively recently; despite being a misconception, it is sometimes locally described as Finnish-type.

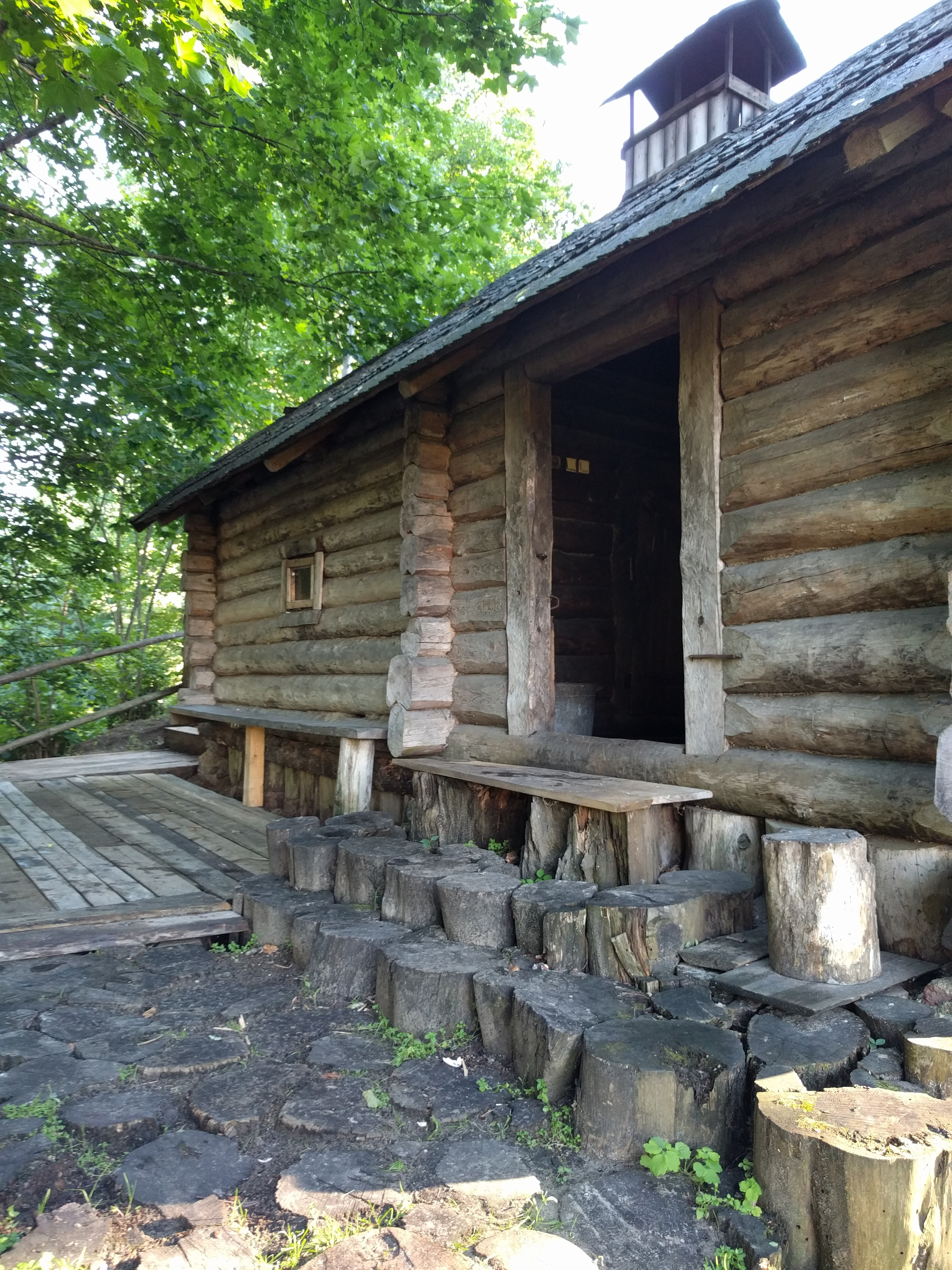
Traditional Lithuanian sauna in Zervynos, Dzūkija region

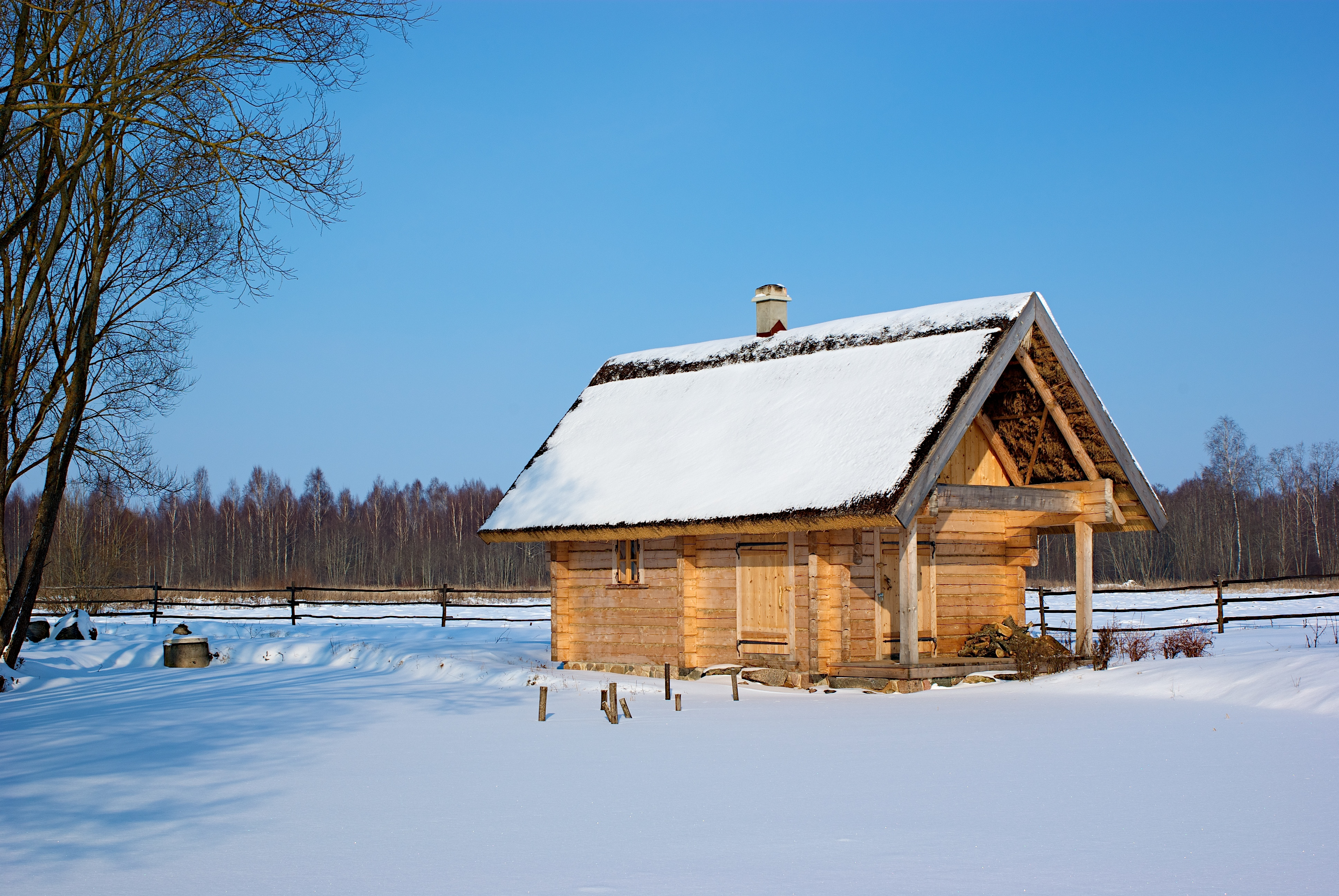
Latvian sauna covered in snow

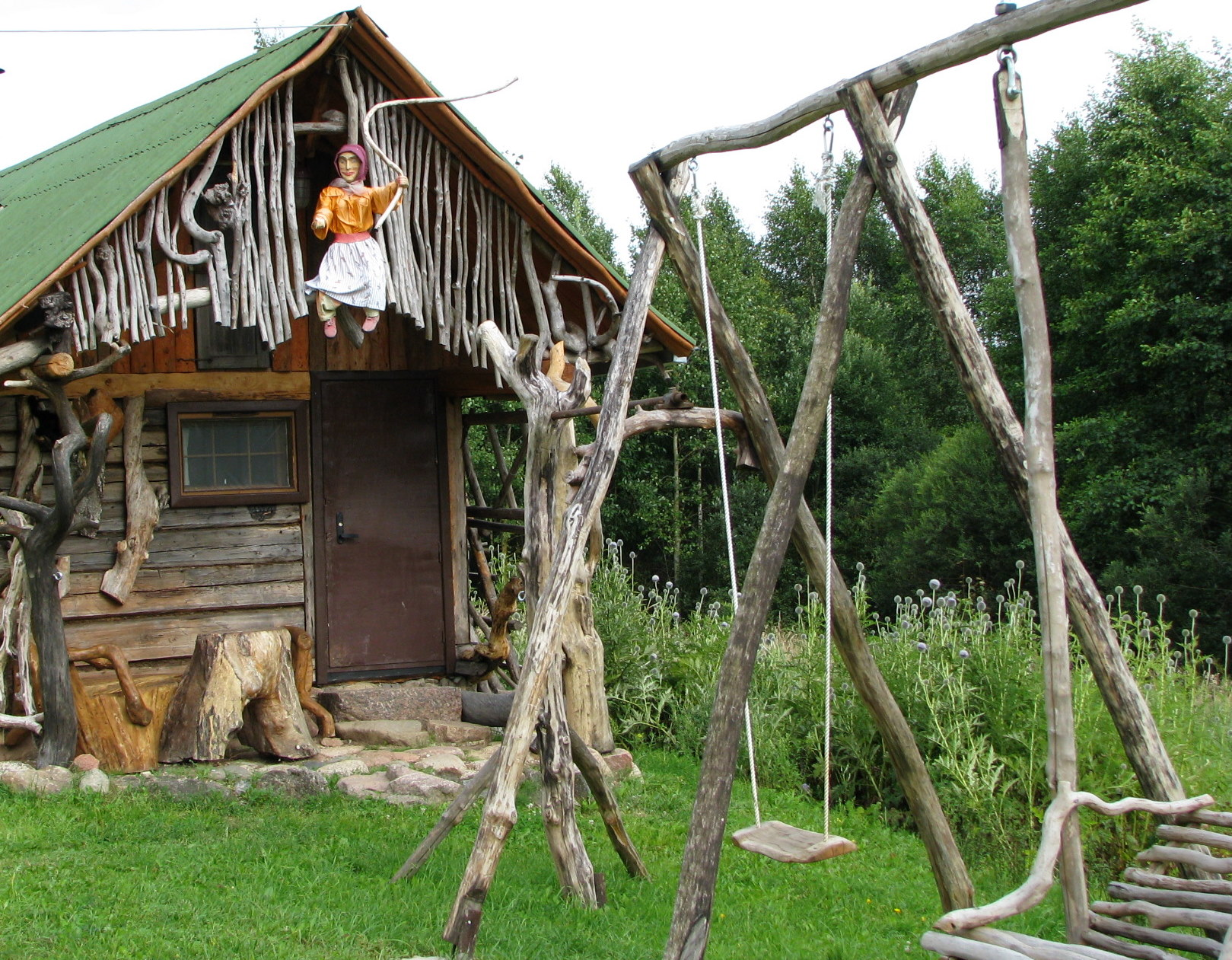
Lithuanian sauna with the mythological decorations of witches

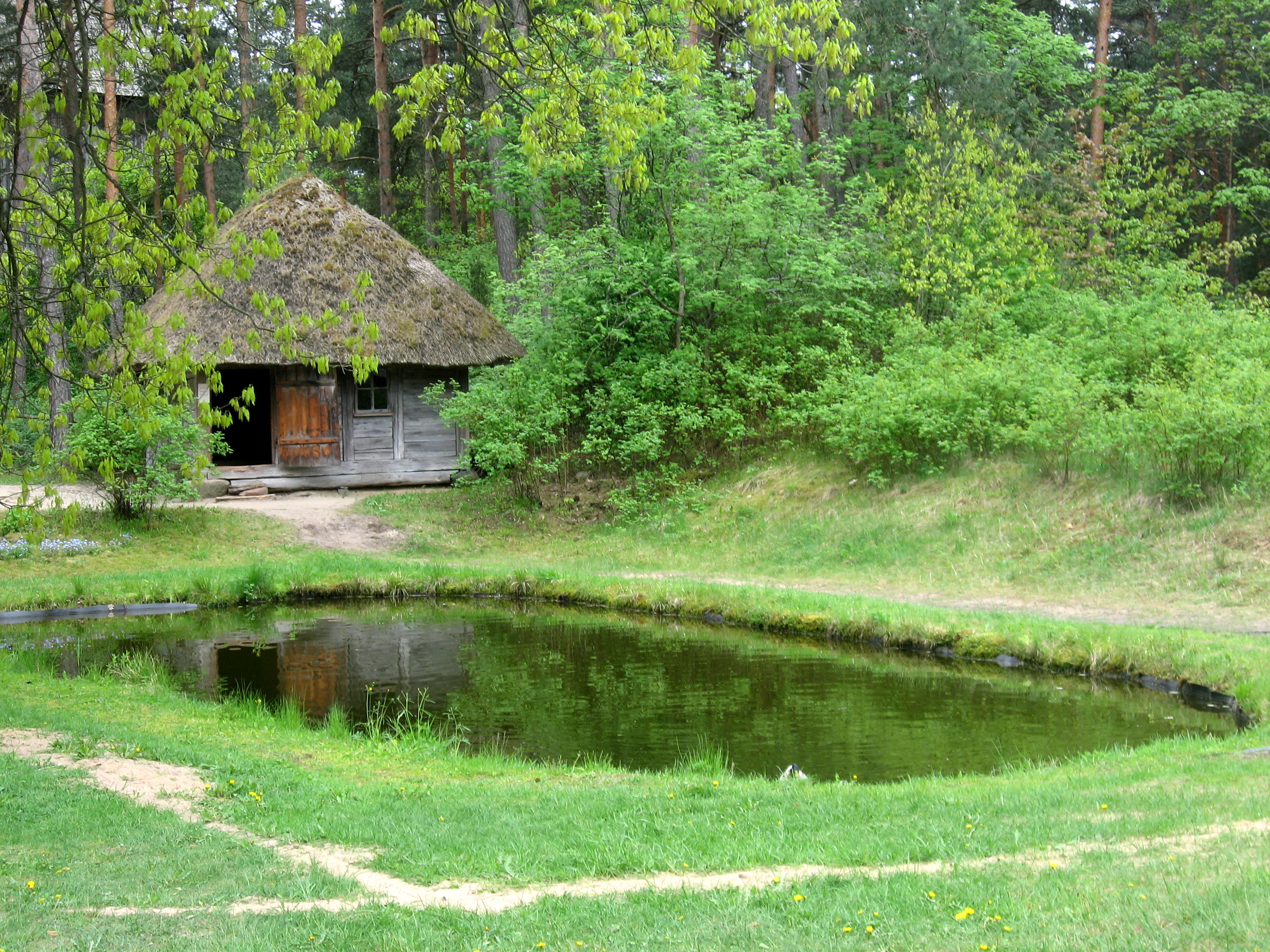
Latvian bathhouse with a pond built in 1862 in Kurzeme, The Ethnographic Open-Air Museum of Latvia

===== Norway and Sweden =====
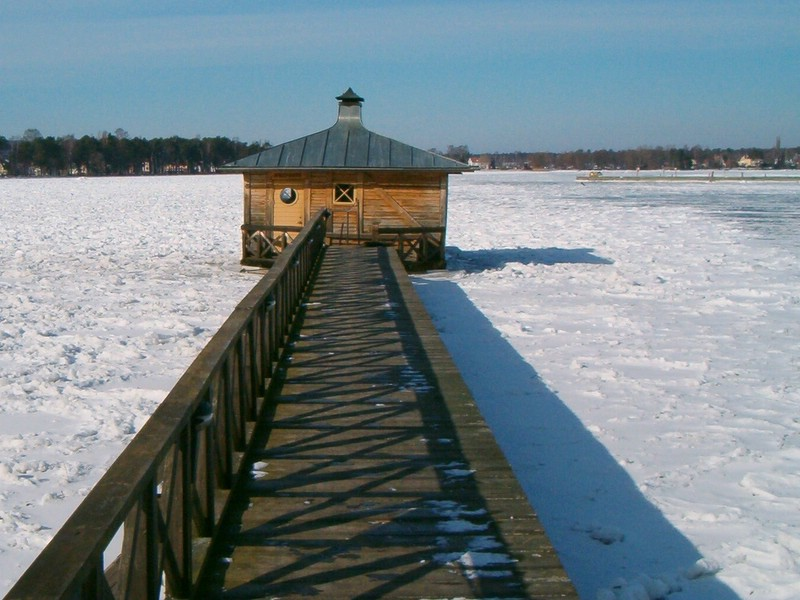
Swedish sauna house on the lake

In Norway and Sweden saunas are found in many places and are known as 'badstu' or 'bastu' (from 'badstuga' "bath cabin, bath house"). In Norway and Sweden, saunas are common in public swimming pools and gyms. Public saunas are generally single-sex. Rules for swimwear and towels for sitting on or covering one's body differ between saunas. Removing body hair in the sauna, staring at other's nudity, or spreading odors is considered impolite.

==== Dutch-speaking regions ====
Public saunas can be found throughout the Netherlands and Flanders, both in major cities and in smaller municipalities, mixed-sex nudity is the generally accepted rule. Some saunas might offer women-only (or "bathing suit only") times for people who are less comfortable with mixed-sex nudity; Algemeen Dagblad reported in 2008 that women-only, bathing suit-required times are drawing Muslim women in the Netherlands to the sauna.

==== United Kingdom, Atlantic and Mediterranean Europe ====
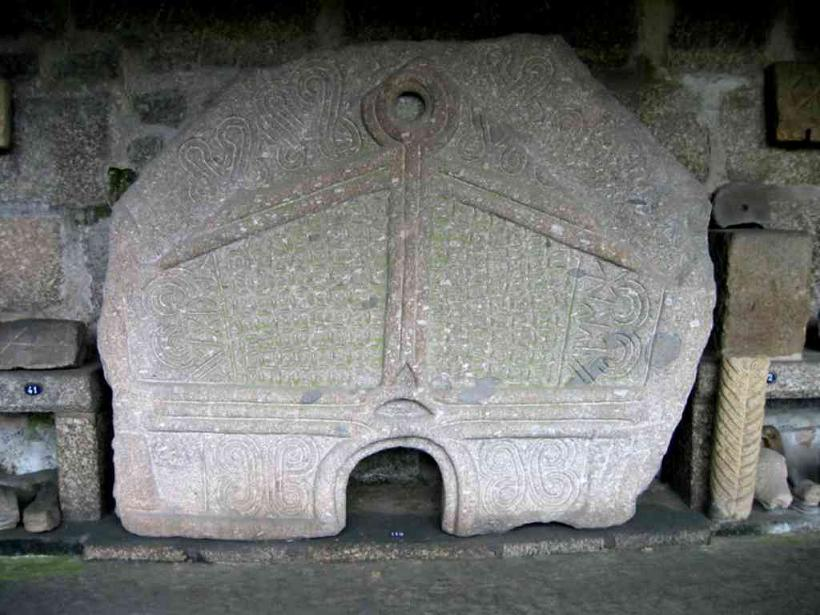
Pedra formosa-lusitanian sauna front stone

In the United Kingdom and much of Southern Europe, single-gender saunas are the most common type. Nudity is expected in the segregated saunas but is usually forbidden in the mixed saunas. Sauna sessions tend to be shorter, and cold showers are shunned by most. In the United Kingdom, where public saunas are becoming increasingly fashionable, the practice of alternating between the sauna and the jacuzzi in short seatings (considered a faux pas in Northern Europe) has emerged.

There is a fast-growing British sauna culture around bodies of water. These range from pop-up sauna events using unconventional containers to fully developed permanent establishments.

In Portugal, the steam baths were commonly used by the Castrejos people, before the arrival of the Romans in the western part of the Iberian Peninsula. The historian Strabo spoke of Lusitans traditions that consisted of having steam bath sessions followed by cold water baths. Pedra Formosa is the original name given to the central piece of the steam bath in pre-Roman times.

==== German-speaking countries ====
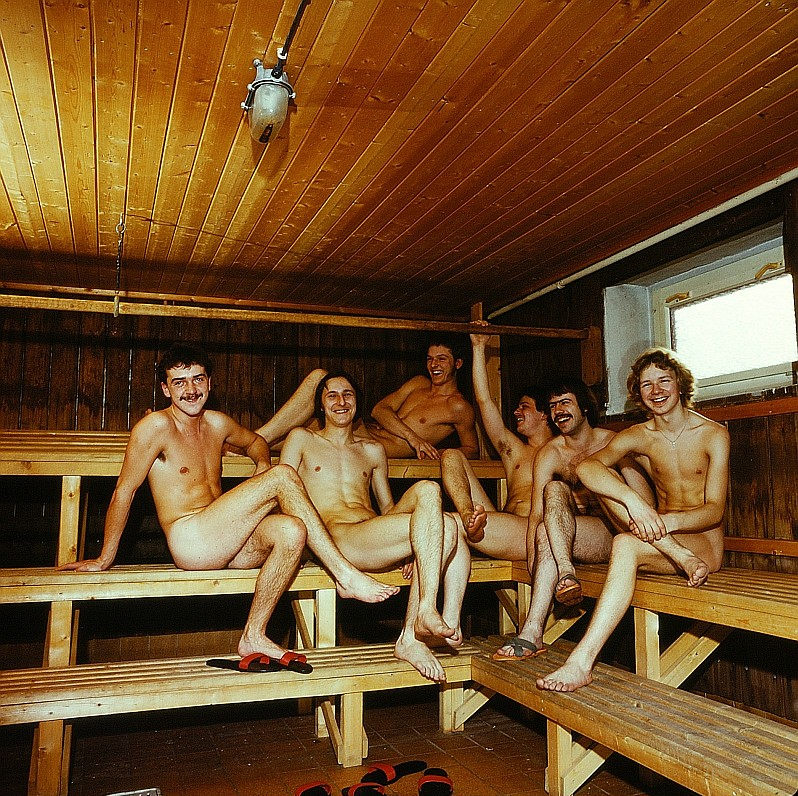
Sauna in Freiberg, Germany

In Germany, Austria, Luxembourg, South Tyrol and Liechtenstein, most public swimming pool complexes have sauna areas; in these locales, nudity is the generally accepted rule, and benches are expected to be covered by people's towels. These rules are strictly enforced in some public saunas. Separate single-sex saunas for both genders are rare, most places offer women-only and mixed-gender saunas or organize women-only days for the sauna once a week. Loud conversation is not usual as the sauna is seen as a place of healing rather than socializing. Contrary to Russia and Nordic countries, pouring water on hot stones to increase humidity (Aufguss, lit: "Onpouring") is not normally done by the sauna visitors themselves; larger sauna areas have a person in charge (the Saunameister) for that, either an employee of the sauna complex or a volunteer. Aufguss sessions can take up to 10 minutes, and take place according to a schedule. During an Aufguss session, the Saunameister uses a large towel to circulate the hot air through the sauna, intensifying sweating and the perception of heat. Once the Aufguss session has started it is not considered good manners to enter the sauna, as opening the door would cause loss of heat (Sauna guests are expected to enter the sauna just in time before the Aufguss. Leaving the session is allowed, and is advised when feeling too hot or otherwise uncomfortable). Aufguss sessions are usually announced by a schedule on the sauna door. An Aufguss session in progress might be indicated by a light or sign hung above the sauna entrance. Cold showers or baths shortly after a sauna, as well as exposure to fresh air in a special balcony, garden, or open-air room (Frischluftraum) are considered a must.

In German-speaking Switzerland, customs are generally the same as in Germany and Austria, although you tend to see more families (parents with their children) and young people. Also concerning socializing in the sauna, the Swiss tend more to be like the Finns, Scandinavians, or Russians. Also in German-speaking countries, there are many facilities for washing after using the sauna, with 'dunking pools' (pools of very cold water in which a person dips themselves after using the sauna) or showers. In some saunas and steam rooms, scented salts are given out which can be rubbed into the skin for extra aroma and cleaning effects.

==== Hungary ====
Hungarians see the sauna as part of a wider spa culture. Most commonly, mixed genders use the sauna together and wear swimsuits. Single-sex saunas are rare, as well as those that impose nudity although the practice is growing and several spas have a towel-only policy on designated days. The most common types of saunas are the very hot and dry Finnish sauna (finn szauna), the steam room (gőzkabin), and the infrared sauna (infraszauna). In many larger spas, you can find a separate sauna section that can only be used with a separate entrance ticket. These units are often called sauna world (szaunavilág) and have additional services, for example, a cold plunge pool, resting areas, jacuzzi, showers, and crushed ice bucket. Aufguss sessions, led by a qualified sauna master, are becoming popular.

==== Czech Republic and Slovakia ====
In the Czech Republic and Slovakia, saunas have a long tradition and are often found as part of recreational facilities, as well as public swimming pools. Many people are regular goers, while many never go. Saunas became more popular after about the year 2000 when large aquaparks and wellness centers began to include them. Nudity is increasingly tolerated, and many places prohibit the use of swimsuits; however, most people cover themselves with a towel. Showers are typically semi-private. Having men and women-only days was the norm in the past, but today, men-only facilities are rare, while women-only hours are sometimes provided.

==== Russia ====
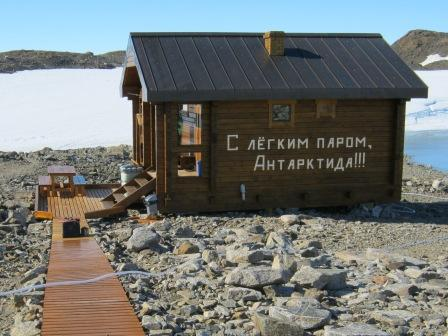
Russian banya in Antarctica

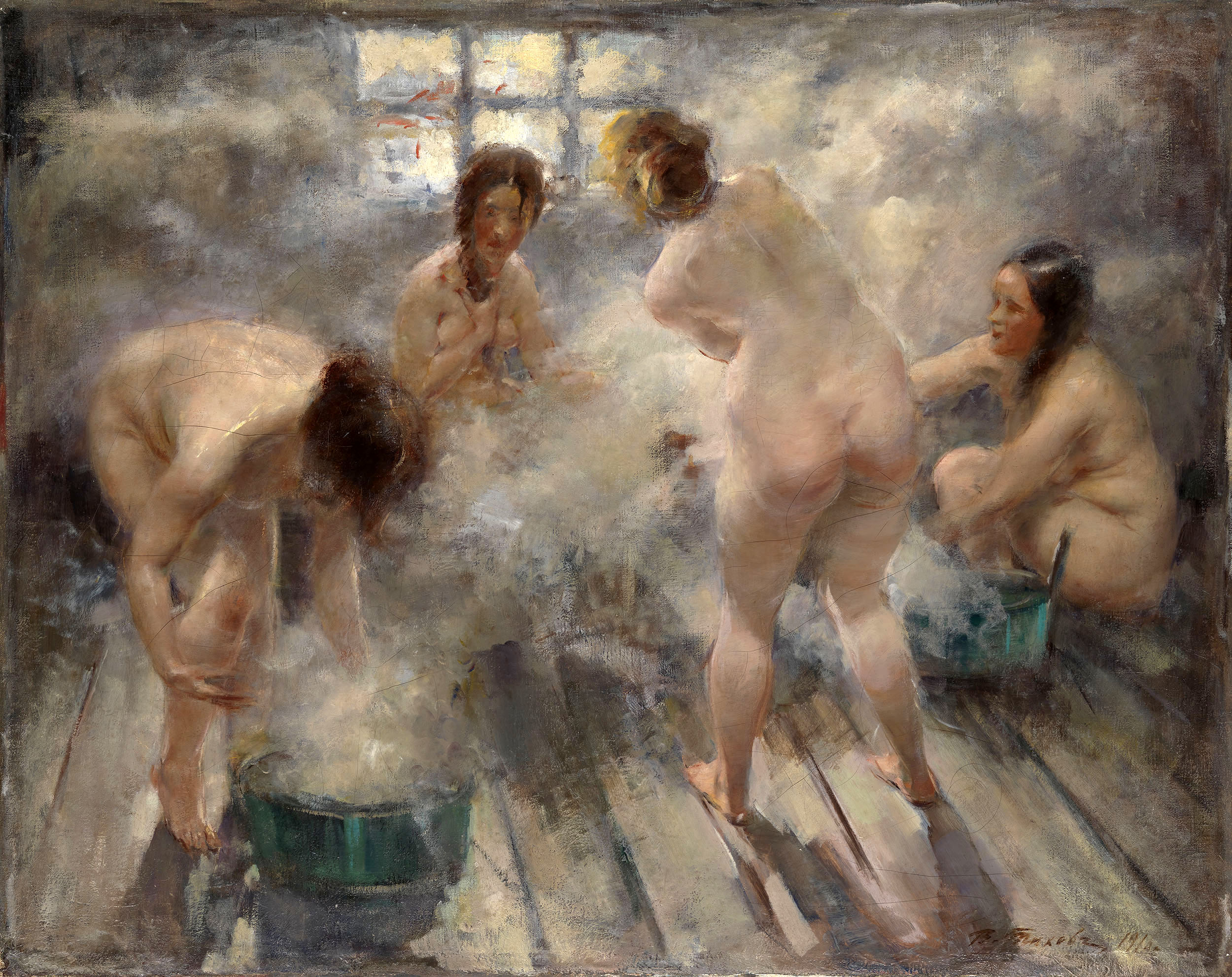
In a Russian Banya (1916), by Vitaly Tikhov

In many regions of Russia, sauna-going plays a central social role. These countries also have the tradition of massaging fellow sauna-goers with leafy, wet birch bunches, called venik (веник) in Russian. In Russian-speaking communities, the word banya (Russian: Баня) is widely used also when referring to a public bath. In Russia, public banya baths are strictly single-sex. During wintertime, sauna-goers often run outdoors for either ice swimming or, in the absence of lake, just to roll around in the snow naked and then go back inside. Russian traditional banya is quite similar to the Finnish sauna, despite the popular misconception that the Finnish sauna is very dry.

=== North America and Central America ===
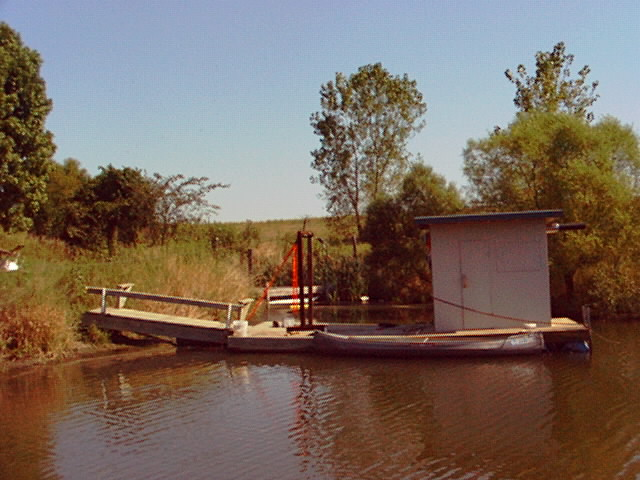
Wood-heated floating sauna on Iowa farm pond

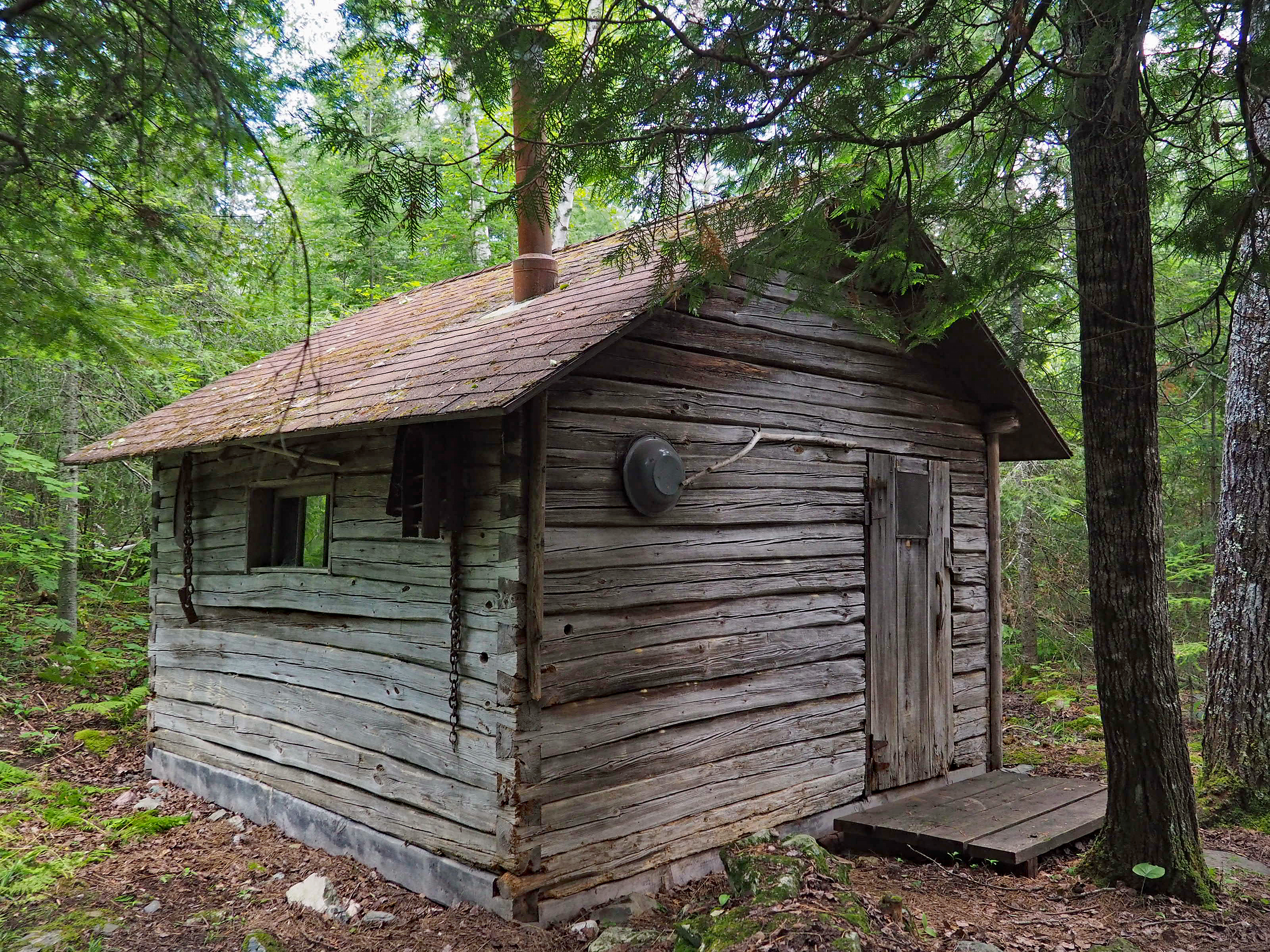
An old sauna of Listening Point on the shores of Burntside Lake in Morse Township, Minnesota

In the United States, the earliest saunas that arrived with the colonists were Swedish bastus in the colony of New Sweden around the Delaware River. The Swedish governor at the time had a bathhouse on Tinicum Island. Today sauna culture enjoys its greatest popularity in the Lake Superior Region, specifically the Upper Peninsula of Michigan, especially the Keweenaw Peninsula, and parts of Minnesota, Wisconsin, and Iowa, which are home to large populations of Swedish and particularly Finnish Americans. Duluth, Minnesota, at its peak, had as many as 14 public saunas. Indeed, among Finnish farms in Great Lakes "sauna country", the cultural geographer Matti Kaups, found that 90% had sauna structures - more even than the farms in Finland. Elsewhere, sauna facilities are normally provided at health clubs and hotels, but there is no tradition or ritual to their use. To avoid liability, many saunas operate at only moderate temperatures and do not allow pouring water on the rocks. A wider range of sauna etiquette is usually acceptable in the United States compared to other countries, with the exception that most mixed-sex saunas usually require some clothing such as a bathing suit to be worn. These are uncommon, however, as most saunas are either in small private rooms or in the changing rooms of health clubs or gyms. There are few restrictions and their use is casual; bathers may enter and exit the sauna as they please, be it nude, with a towel, dripping wet in swimsuits, or even in workout clothes (the latter being very unusual). Like many aspects of US culture, there are few prescribed conventions and the bather should remain astute to "read" the specific family or community's expectations. Besides the Finnish Americans, the older generation of Korean Americans still uses the saunas as it is available to them. Sauna societies are beginning to emerge in colleges across America, with the first one being formed at Gustavus Adolphus College.

A cultural legacy of Eastern European Jews in America is the culture of 'shvitz', which used to be widespread on the East Coast and occasionally on the Pacific West Coast.

The sweat lodge, used by several Native American and First Nations traditional ceremonial cultures, is a location for a spiritual ceremony. The focus is on the ceremony, and the sweating is only secondary. Unlike sauna traditions, and most forcefully in the case of the Inipi, the sweat lodge ceremonies have been robustly defended as an exclusively Native expression of spirituality rather than a recreational activity.

== Traditions and old beliefs ==
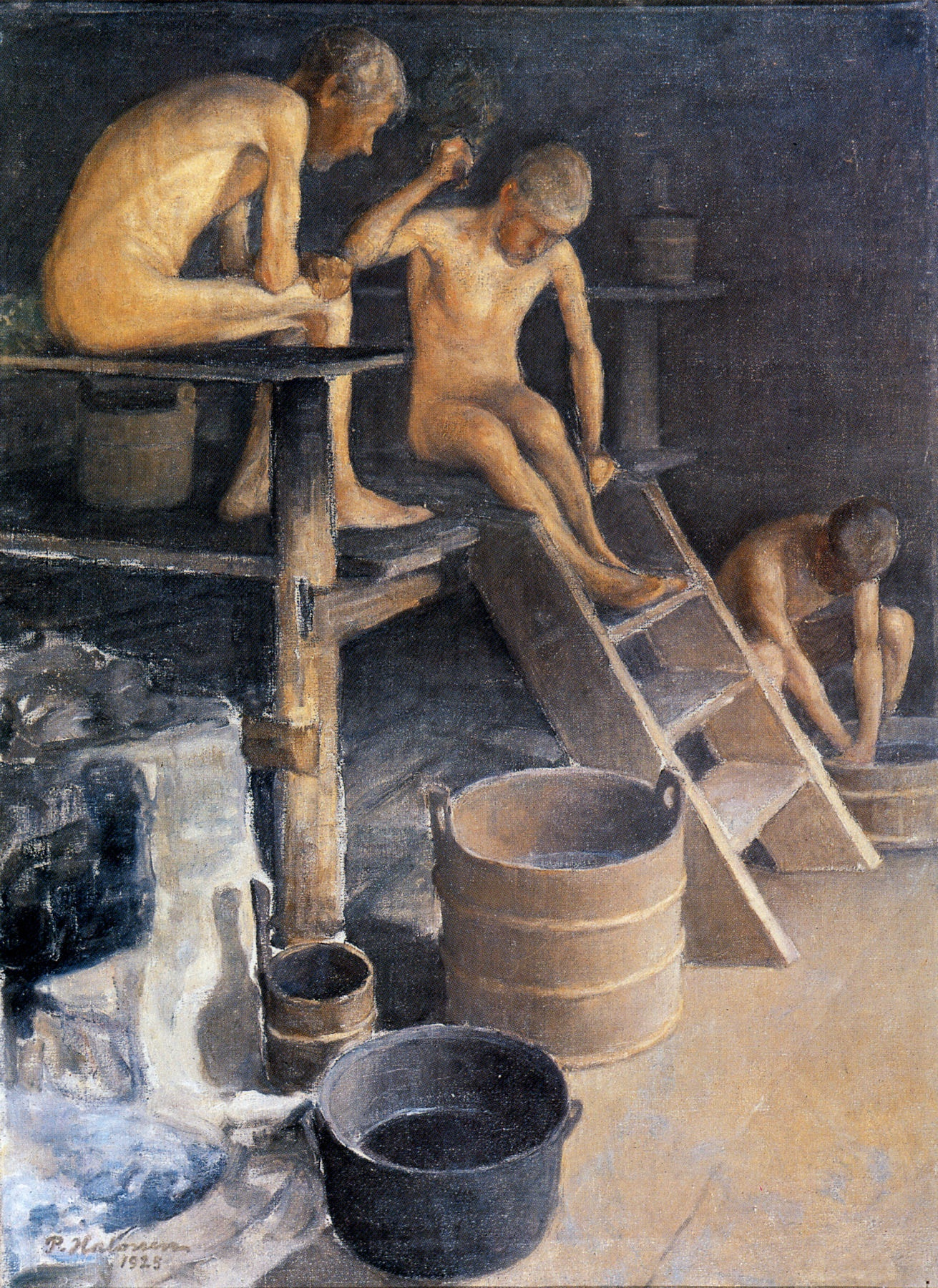
In the sauna (1925), by Pekka Halonen

The Finnish word löyly [ˈløyly] is strictly connected to the sauna. It can be translated as "sauna steam" and refers to the steam vapour created by splashing water on the heated rocks. In many languages related to Finnish, there is a word corresponding to löyly. The same approximate meaning is used across the Finnic languages such as in Estonian leil. Originally this word meant "spirit" or "life", as in e. g. Hungarian lélek and Khanty lil, which both mean "soul", referring to the sauna's old, spiritual essence. The same dual meaning of both "spirit" and "(sauna) steam" is also preserved in the Latvian word gars. There is an old Finnish saying, "saunassa ollaan kuin kirkossa",—one should behave in the sauna as in church.

Saunatonttu, literally translated as "sauna elf", is a little gnome or tutelary spirit that was believed to live in the sauna. He was always treated with respect, otherwise, he might have caused much trouble for people. It was customary to warm up the sauna just for the tonttu every now and then, or to leave some food outside for him. It is said that he warned the people if a fire was threatening the sauna or punished people who behaved improperly in it—for example, slept, played games, argued, were generally noisy, or behaved otherwise immorally there. Such creatures are believed to exist in different cultures. The Russian banya has an entirely corresponding character called a bannik.

== See also ==
- Aræotic
- Balneotherapy
- "Bara bada bastu"
- Bathtub
- Day spa
- Destination spa
- Hot spring
- Mud bath
- Onsen
- Purification Rundown
- Spa town
- Steambath
- Sudatorium
- Svedana
- Taiwanese hot springs
- World Sauna Championships
