= List of firsts in Finland =

This is a list of firsts in Finland.

== Education and academia ==
- First director of the first Finnish research institute in applied psychology: Ester Hjelt
- First Finnish-speaking teacher training college: University of Jyväskylä
- First state schools for females in Finland: Svenska fruntimmersskolan i Åbo (English: Swedish Women's School of Åbo) and Svenska fruntimmersskolan i Helsingfors (English: Swedish Women's School of Helsingfors) (1844)

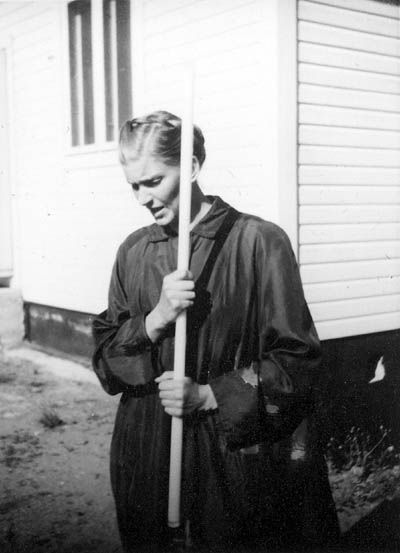
Liisi Oterma, the first woman in Finland to receive a Ph.D. degree in Astronomy.

=== First women ===
- Dissertations
  - First dissertation by a Finnish woman (chemistry, University of Zurich): Lydia Sesemann (1874)
  - First dissertation by a Finnish woman in Finland (Doctor of Medicine and Surgery): Karolina Eskelin (1895)
  - First female opponent at a dissertation (Faculty of Medicine): Elsa Ryti (1927)
  - First dissertation by a Finnish woman in Physics: Eugenie Lisitzin (1938)
  - First dissertation by a Finnish woman in Finnish language studies: Eeva Lindén (1942)
  - First dissertation by a Finnish woman in Astronomy: Liisi Oterma (1955)
  - First dissertation by a Finnish woman in Economics: Vieno Rajaoja (1958)
- Doctors
  - First female doctor of philosophy: Tekla Hultin (1896)
  - First female doctor of agriculture: Synnöve von Hausen (1936)
  - First female doctor of laws (justice) in Finland: Inkeri Anttila (1946)
  - First female doctor of theology: Eira Paunu (1952)
  - First female doctor in social sciences: Elina Haavio-Mannila (1958)
- Professorships
  - First female professor in Finland (Personal Extraordinary Professor, Åbo Akademi): Alma Söderhjelm (1927)
  - First female professor of medicine and holder of a permanent chair (Obstetrics and Gynaecology): Laimi Leidenius (1930)
  - First female professor of chemistry: Salli Eskola (1947)
  - First female professor in physical and natural sciences (assistant professor in chemistry): Salli Eskola
  - First female professor of pedagogy: Inkeri Vikainen (1959)
  - First female professor of law in Finland: Inkeri Anttila (1961)
  - First female professor of sociology: Faina Jyrkilä (1964)
  - First female professor of philosophy in Finland and in Scandinavia: Raili Kauppi (1969)
  - First female professor of women's studies: Päivi Setälä (1991)
- Members of the Finnish Society of Sciences and Letters (Founded 1838)
  - First female member of the Math and Physics division: Eugenie Lisitzin (1960)
- Other
  - First female academic in Finland: Sara Wacklin
  - First female folklorist in Finland to complete a doctoral degree: Elsa Enäjärvi-Haavio
  - First female in Finland to earn a doctorate in the field of philosophy: Raili Kauppi
  - First female licentiate of medicine (without being officially enrolled at a university): Rosina Heikel (1878)
  - First female magister of philosophy: Emma Irene Åström
  - First female minister of justice in Finland: Inkeri Anttila
  - First female rector of a university (University of Jyväskylä): Aino Sallinen (1992)
  - First female to attend a university in Finland: Maria Tschetschulin (1870)
  - First female to defend a doctoral degree in Finland: Karolina Eskelin
  - First female to practice medicine in Finland and within all the Nordic countries: Rosina Heikel
  - First female to receive a Ph.D. degree in astronomy in Finland: Liisi Oterma
  - First female veterinary surgeon in Europe and Finland: Agnes Sjöberg
  - First Finnish woman to be appointed docent at a university: Alma Söderhjelm
  - First Finnish woman to complete a doctorate: Lydia Sesemann
  - First Finnish woman to take the matriculation examination: Maria Tschetschulin
  - First Finnish woman to teach: Alma Söderhjelm

== Literature ==
- First book in the world and Finland written solely in text messages: Viimeiset viestit (English: Last Messages) by Hannu Luntiala (2007)
- First female writer in Finland: Sara Wacklin
- First Finnish language encyclopedia: Tietosanakirja (1909–1922)
- First Finnish language grammar book published: 1649
- First novel published in Finnish: Seven Brothers (Finnish: Seitsemän veljestä) (1870)

== Media ==
=== Film ===
- First active feature film company: Lyyra-Filmi
- First Finnish computer-animated feature film: The Emperor's Secret (Finnish: Keisarin salaisuus) (2006)
- First Finnish feature film and first fictional film: The Moonshiners (Finnish: Salaviinanpolttajat) (1907)
- First full-length Finnish feature film: Sylvi
- First full-length sound film with song and talk: Say It in Finnish (1931)
- First Finnish film: Novelty from Helsinki: School youth at break (1904)
- First Finnish film company: Atelier Apollo (1906)
- First Finnish film distributed widely abroad: When Father Has Toothache (1923)
- First Finnish film released on Blu-ray: Ganes (2007)
- First Finnish film with a soundtrack: Dressed Like Adam and a Bit Like Eve Too (1931)
- First public screening: 1896

=== Other ===
- First Finnish album to certify gold based on downloads and streams: AMK Dropout (2014)
- First Finnish publisher to sell manga: Sangatsu Manga (2003)
- First Finnish video included in MTV Nordic's daily video-rotation: U Drive Me Crazy

== Military ==
- First Finnish Air Force base established: Utti (1918)

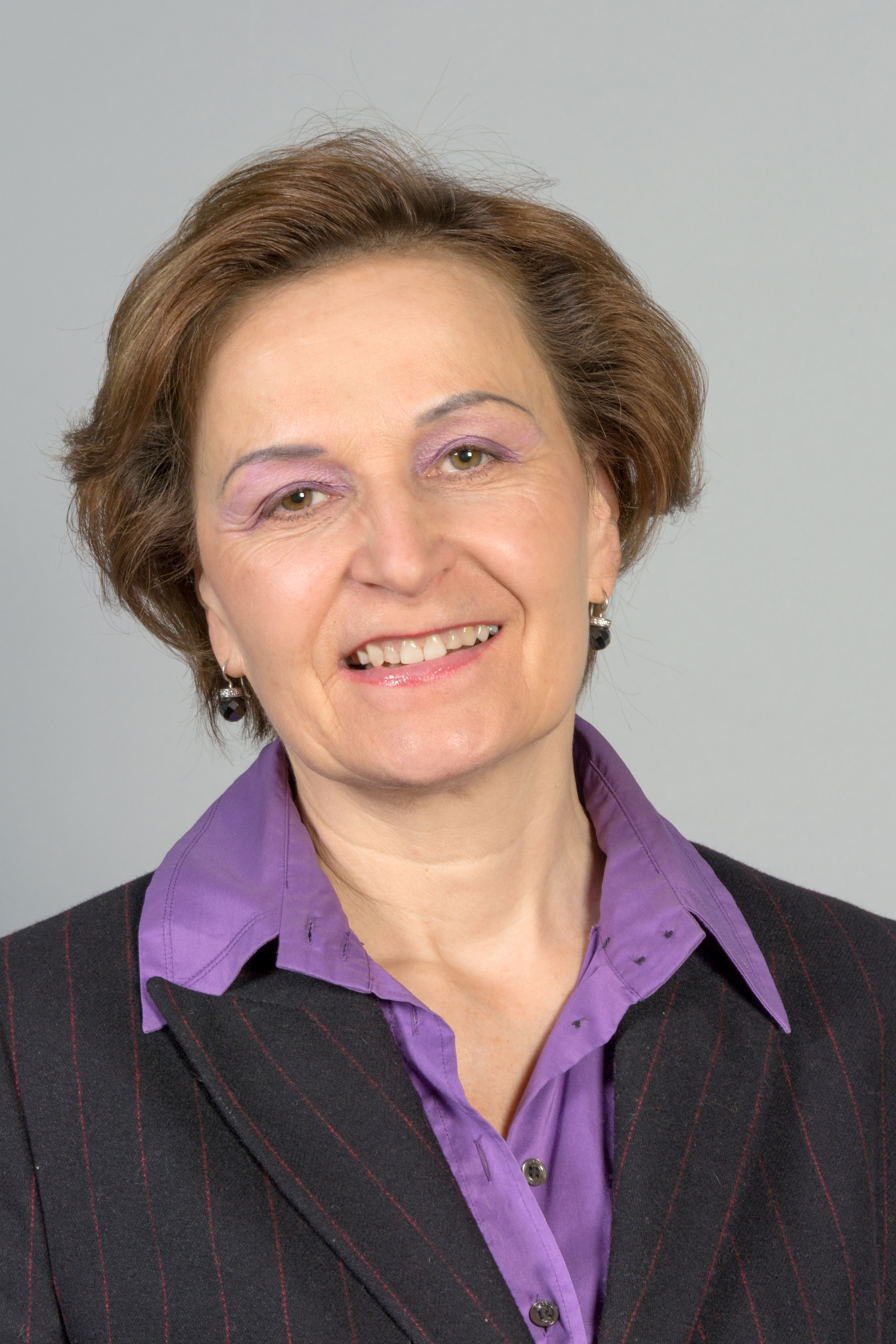
Anneli Jäätteenmäki, the first female Prime Minister of Finland

== Politics and government ==
- First President: Kaarlo Juho Ståhlberg
  - First National Progressive President: Kaarlo Juho Ståhlberg
  - First Agrarian President: Lauri Kristian Relander
  - First National Coalitionist President: Pehr Evind Svinhufvud
  - First Social Democratic President: Mauno Koivisto
  - First female president: Tarja Halonen
- First Prime Minister: Pehr Evind Svinhufvud
  - First female prime minister: Anneli Jäätteenmäki
- First Finnish Black Member of Parliament: Jani Toivola
- First time the president had been solely elected by a popular vote: 1994
- First openly gay member of Parliament: Oras Tynkkynen
- First female members of Parliament elected in Finland and the world: 1907
- First president of the Supreme Court of Finland: August Nybergh, 1918

== Science and technology ==
- First class of locomotive manufactured within Finland: Finnish Steam Locomotive Class A5, 1874

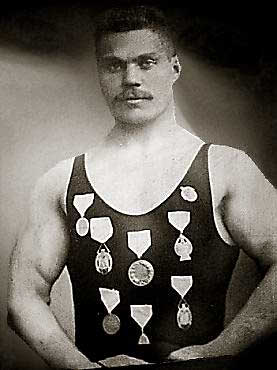
Verner Weckman, the first Finnish Olympic gold medalist.

== Sports and related events ==
- First Finn to play in the Stanley Cup Final: Matti Hagman
- First Finnish basketball player to play in the National Basketball Association: Jarkko Ruutu
- First Finnish boxer to win an Olympic medal: Bruno Ahlberg
- First Finnish cross-country skier to win an Olympic gold medal: Veli Saarinen
- First Finnish Olympic gold medalist: Verner Weckman
- First Finnish player within the National Hockey League: Pentti Lund
- First Finnish player to play in the German Bundesliga: Juhani Peltonen
- First Finnish player to play in the Women's United Soccer Association: Anne Mäkinen
- First Finnish woman to reach Olympic finals in swimming: Eila Pyrhönen

== Titles and awards ==
- First Finnish Nobel Prize winner: Frans Eemil Sillanpää
- First Finnish Olympic gold medalist: Verner Weckman
- First time winning the group stage at the Bandy World Championship: 2011

== Other ==
- First Finnish "freedom fighter": Lalli
- First Finnish entry in the Eurovision Song Contest to be awarded with a maximum score since the start of the twelve-point tradition in 1975: Lapponia
- First Finnish professor of forest inventory: Werner Cajanus
- First homoerotic stamps produced in Finland and the world: 2014 Tom of Finland stamps
- First time participating in the Eurovision Song Contest: 1961
  - First representative of Finland at the Eurovision Song Contest: Laila Kinnunen

== See also ==
- List of firsts in Sweden
