= Tschetschulin =

Tschetschulin is a surname. Notable people with the surname include:

- Agnes Tschetschulin (1859–1942), Finnish composer and violinist
- Maria Tschetschulin (1852–1917), Finnish clerk, first woman to attend university in Finland
