= Haavio =

Haavio is a Finnish surname. Notable people with the surname include:

- Elina Haavio-Mannila (born 1933), Finnish social scientist
- Martti Haavio (1899–1973), Finnish poet, folklorist, and mythologist
