= Jarl Axel Wasastjerna =

Finnish physicist (1896–1972)

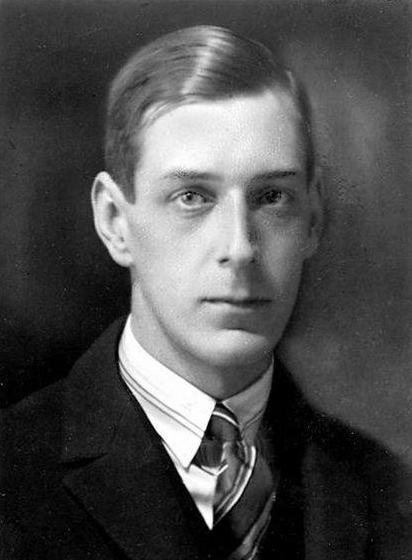
J. A. Wasastjerna

Jarl Axel Wasastjerna (18 November 1896, in Helsinki – 15 October 1972, in Helsinki) was a Finnish physicist. After his academic career, he worked in industry, received an honorary degree in technology in 1949, and the honorary title of Vuorineuvos in 1957.

Wasastjerna was Professor of Applied Physics at the University of Helsinki from 1925–1946, where he oversaw the dissertation of Eugenie Lisitzin, the first woman to earn a PhD in Finland in 1938. He later became envoy of Finland in Stockholm from 1940 to 1943, Managing Director of United Wool Company from 1948 to 1954, President of the Nordic Union Bank from 1944 1951, and Chairman of the Tampella Executive Board beginning in 1944. He died in 1972.
