= List of firsts in Sweden =

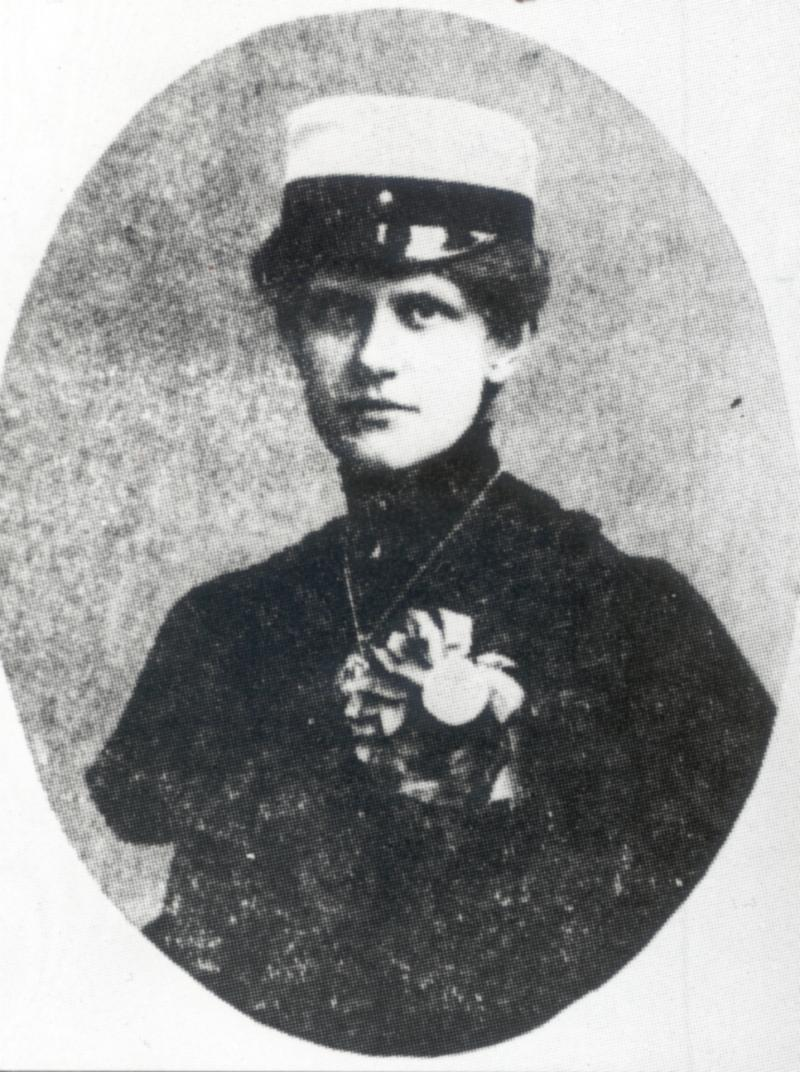
Betty Pettersson, the first woman to study in a Swedish university.

This is a list of firsts in Sweden.

== Politics and government ==
- First Prime Minister: Louis De Geer: March 20, 1876 – April 19, 1880.
- First female minister of cabinet: Karin Kock (s), 1947
- First female leader of a Riksdag party: Karin Söder (c), 1985
- First female prime minister: Magdalena Andersson: 30 November 2021 – 18 October 2022.
- First openly homosexual minister of cabinet: Andreas Carlgren (c), 2006.
- First minister of cabinet of African origin: Nyamko Sabuni (fp), 2006.
- First speaker of the unicameral Riksdag: Henry Allard (s), 1971.

== Architecture ==
- First planned settlement: Birka

== Education and academia ==
- First university: Uppsala University, founded in 1477, continuous since 1593.
- First female dentist: Rosalie Fougelberg, 1867 (Amalia Assur, was licensed in 1852, but only with a special permission)
- First female medical doctor: Karolina Widerström, 1884
- First female PhD: Ellen Fries, promoted in 1883
- First female professor: Sofia Kovalevskaya, 1889
- First female university student: Betty Pettersson, 1872
- First (trained) nurse: Emmy Rappe, 1867
- First female pharmacist: Agnes Arvidsson, 1903 (First female with a degree in pharmacology)
- First female psychiatrist: Alfhild Tamm, 1908

== Science and technology ==
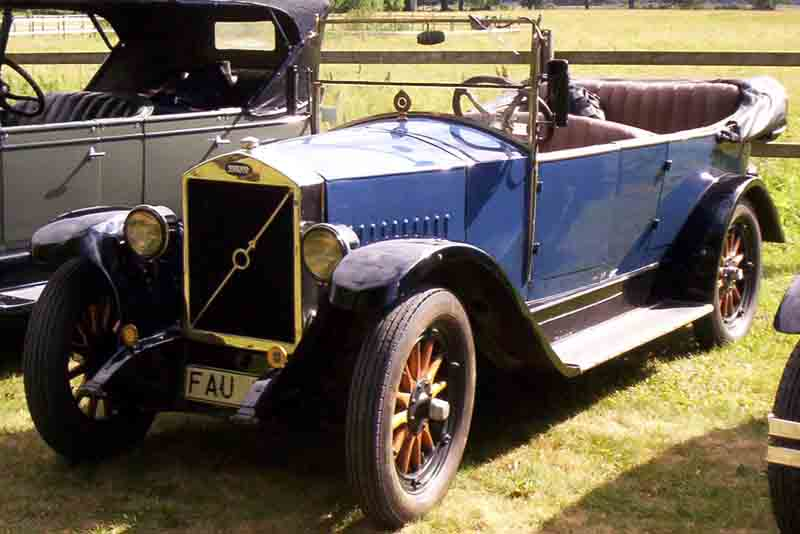
Volvo's first automobile, the ÖV4.

- First scientific discovery: Lymphatic system by Olaus Rudbeck.
- First elephant: Imported from Ceylon in 1804.
- First railway: Frykstadbanan, between Frykstad and Klara Älvs, in the province of Värmland, converted to steam operation in 1855.
- First home-built automobile: a steam car built in 1891-92 by brothers Jöns and Anders Cederholm.
- First aeroplane flight: Frenchman George Legagneux flew his aircraft in Stockholm, 1909.
- First Volvo automobile: Volvo ÖV4, left production line on 14 April, 1927.
- First line of the Stockholm Metro: Slussen to Hökarängen, opened October 1, 1950.
- First nuclear reactor: R1 at Royal Institute of Technology, started on July 13, 1954.
- First motorway: Malmö-Lund, 1950s.

== Culture ==
- First official translation of the Bible: Gustav Vasa Bible, 1541
- First professional native actress: Beata Sabina Straas, 1737
- First theatre: Björngårdsteatern, 1640
- First professional woman photographer: Brita Sofia Hesselius, 1845
- First female film producer: Ebba Lindkvist, 1910

== Business ==
- First casino: Casino Cosmopol in Sundsvall, opened on July 1, 2001

== Titles and awards ==
- First Miss Sweden to win Miss World Kicki Håkansson in 1951
- First Miss Sweden to win Miss Universe Hillevi Rombin in 1955

== Other ==
- First professional woman swimmer Nancy Edberg, 1847

== See also ==
- List of firsts in Finland
