= Päivi Setälä =

Finnish historian and professor

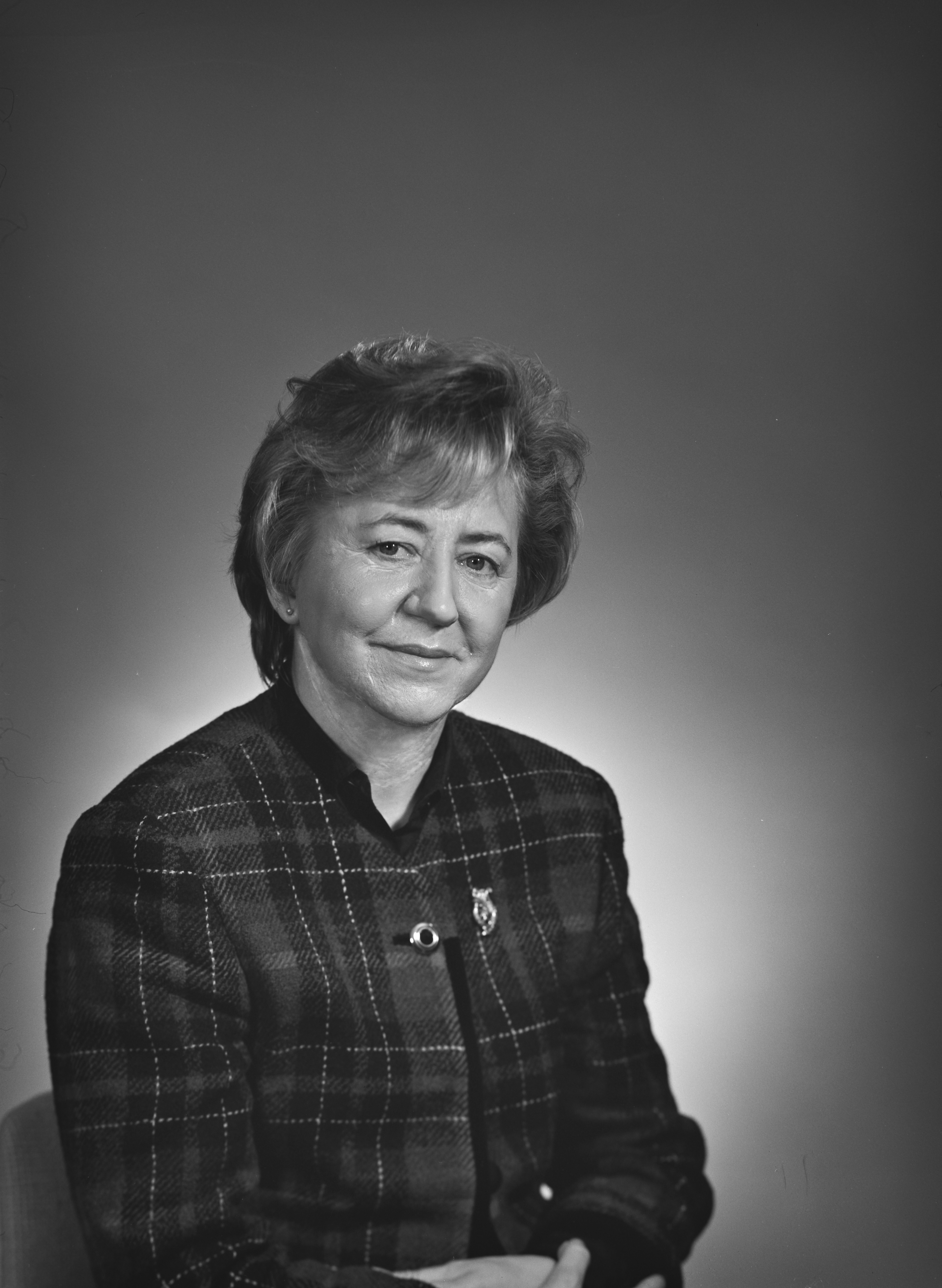
Päivi Setälä (1992)

Päivi Setälä (20 January 1943 – 7 March 2014) was a Finnish historian and professor who influenced different areas of Finnish cultural life. She was one of the best advocates of Finnish women's research. In 1991, she became the first female professor of Women's Studies in Finland. She received the State Disclosure Award, Finnish Writers' Association's Warelius Award, and JV Snellman Award.

== Biography ==
Päivi Eeva Marjatta Priha was born on 20 January 1943 in Kuopio.

Setälä defended her doctorate in history from the University of Helsinki in 1977. Her thesis Private domini in Roman brick stamps of the empire dealt with brick stamps used in the Roman Empire. Setälä worked at the university as a history assistant between 1970 and 1982, and in the 1980s, held several professor positions. In 1991, she was appointed as an extraordinary professor of women's history at the Kristiina Institute, founded in the same year. After three years of professorship, she served as Director of the Finnish Institute in Rome from 1994 to 1997.

The main part of Setälä's research is biographies of women's history. The work Kuningatar Kristiina – aikansa eurooppalainen ("Queen Kristiina, the European of her time") (1990), which she co-authored with Matti Klinge, Laura Kolbe, and Maria-Liisa Nevala, received the honorary mention for the Finlandia Prize. She authored the trilogy, Antiikin nainen ("Ancient Woman") (1993), Keskiajan nainen ("Medieval Woman") (1996) and Renessanssin nainen ("Renaissance Woman") (2000).

Setälä died on 7 March 2014 in Helsinki.

== Awards ==
- 1991, State Disclosure Award for promoting women's research and women's history
- 1998, Finnish Writers' Association's Warelius Award
- 2001, Professor's title awarded by President of the Republic Tarja Halonen
- 2003, Cultural Award of the Church for valuable contribution to the activities of St. Birgita's 700th anniversary.
- 2006, JV Snellman Award

== Selected works ==
- Private domini in Roman brick stamps of the empire (väitöskirja). Suomalainen Tiedeakatemia 1977.
- Kuningatar Kristiina – aikansa eurooppalainen. (Matti Klingen, Laura Kolben ja Maria-Liisa Nevalan kanssa.) Otava 1990.
- Antiikin nainen. Helsingissä: Otava, 1993 (6. painos 2005). ISBN 951-1-12613-X.
- Keskiajan nainen. Helsingissä: Otava, 1996 (4. painos 2005). ISBN 951-1-13305-5.
- Näköaloja Villa Lantesta (Otava 1998)
- Renessanssin nainen: Naisten elämää 1400- ja 1500-luvun Italiassa. Helsingissä: Otava, 2000. ISBN 951-1-15976-3.
- Pohjoisen renessanssin nainen: 1500- ja 1600-luvun naishistoriaa. Helsingissä: Otava, 2002. ISBN 951-1-18059-2.
- Setälä, Päivi & Ahl, Eva (toim.): Pyhä Birgitta: Euroopan suojeluspyhimys. Helsingissä: Otava, 2003. ISBN 951-1-18646-9.

== See also ==
- List of firsts in Finland
