= Constance Ullner =

Finnish writer (1856–1926)

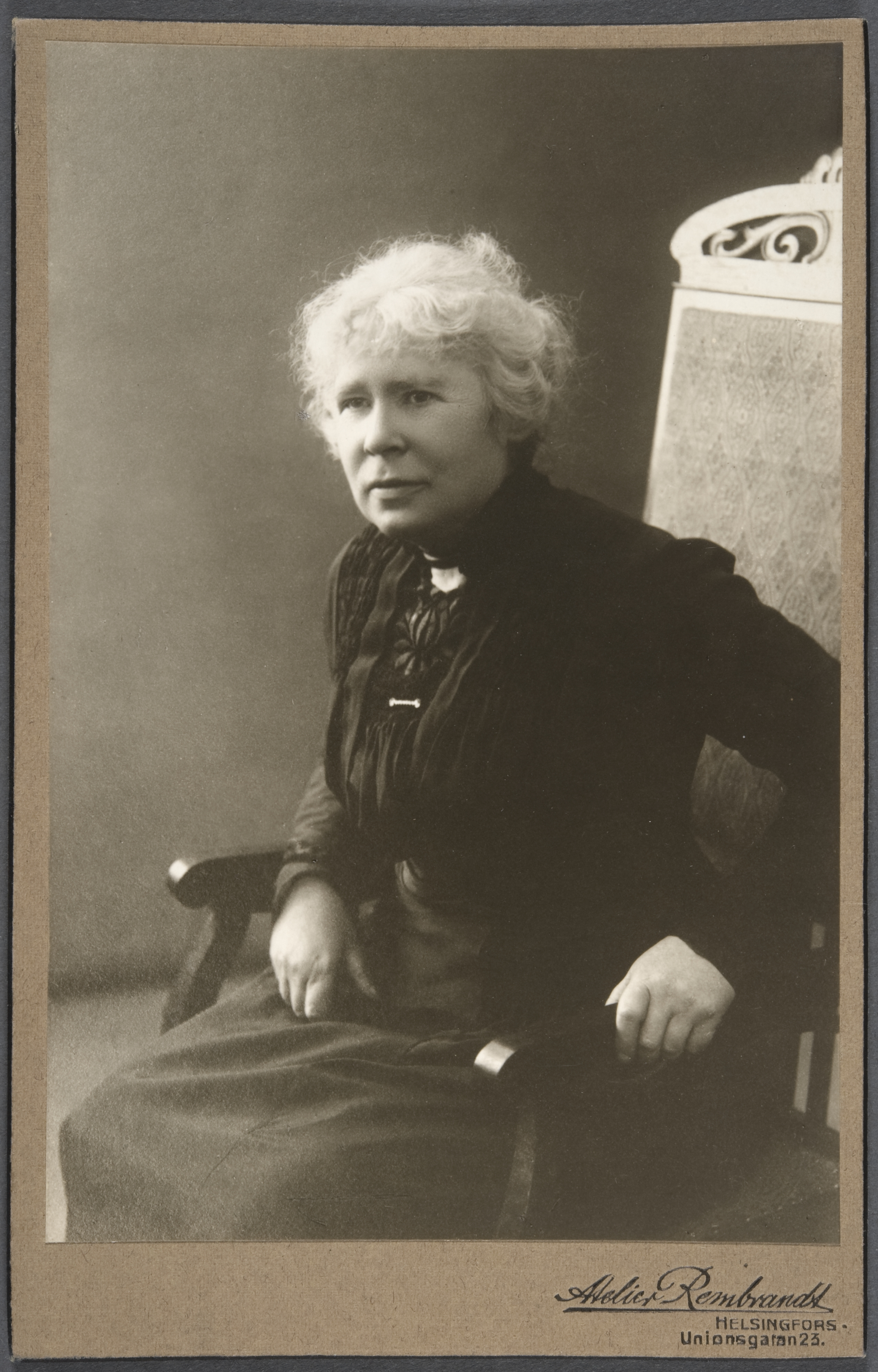
- Atelier Rembrandt. National Museum of Finland, History's picture collection.
- Born: 20 March 1856 Vanta, Finland
- Died: 13 January 1926 (aged 69) Helsinki
- Occupation: Writer

Constance Maria Ullner (20 March 1856 in Vantaa – 13 January 1926 Helsinki) was a Finnish animal protection activist and writer.

== Early life and career ==
Constance Ullner was born into an upper-class Swedish-speaking family in Helsinki. The parents were municipal councilor Robert Ullner and Anna von Kothen. Ullner attended a Swedish girls' school in Helsinki and in 1876 married the Swedish factory worker Theodor Gullberg, but the union ended in separation in 1878 and Ullner returned to Finland. After the marriage failed, Ullner graduated as a teacher, but as a divorced woman, she could not get a teaching job. Ullner participated in animal protection and charity activities. In accordance with the animal protection thinking typical of the time, Ullner emphasized the education of children, which he carried out by giving lectures on the friendly treatment of animals in schools and associations. The Little Birds spring club founded by Topelius was so popular in schools that the number of members rose to 30,000.

She worked for 40 years in Helsinki as a postmaster, starting in 1888. Ullner was a prominent animal activist in Finland and the Nordic countries. She worked both as a public speaker and a writer, the latter also under the pseudonym Wanda. She also edited the publications Finlands djurskydd and Den lilla djurvänne.

== Animal Protection Society of Helsinki ==
Ullner toured international meetings and was particularly opposed to the fashion for women's hats, where bird feathers were used as decoration. This had driven many species, such as silk peas in England, to near extinction. She was a key figure in the activities of the Animal Protection Society of Helsinki, founded in 1874, and served as its chairman in 1916–1926. Ullner represented the organization at the 13th International Animal Protection Congress in Paris in 1900 and on his initiative. since 1909 Animal Day began to be celebrated in Finland every year on October 4. Ullner also worked as editor-in-chief of the Animal Protection magazine from 1894.

== Bibliography ==
- Skuggbilder, novellikokoelma. 1880 (nimimerkillä Wanda; ilmestyi suomeksi nimellä Varjokuvia, 1883)
- Spillror, utkast af Wanda. P. H. Beijer, Helsingfors 1885
- Rättvisa åt djuren: en samling uppsatser utgifna till förmån för Djurskyddsföreningen i Helsingfors, af V. Lindman och Constance Ullner. Helsingfors 1892
- Vår: tillfällighetsblad, utgifvet af Eva Ljungberg och Constance Ullner. Helsingfors 1894
- Om slakt af husdjur: ströskrift, Constance Ullner och V. Lindman. 1903
- Djurskyddsberättelser för barn. 1904 (yhdessä Eva Ljungbergin kanssa, ilmestyi suomeksi nimellä Eläinsuojeluskertomuksia lapsille, 1904)
- Om småfåglarna och deras nytta: ströskrift, Constance Ullner och V. Lindman. 1904, 1911 (suomeksi nimellä Pikkulinnut ja niiden hyöty: lentokirjanen, 1911)
- Mitt barndomshem: publikation, med bidrag af inhemska skriftställarinnor och skriftställare, utgifven till förmån för Helsingfors Djurskyddsförening af V. Lindman och Constance Ullner. Helsingfors 1905
- Guld Korn: uttalanden i djurskyddsfrågor samlade af Constance Ullner. 1908
- Spridda drag ur Eva Ahlströms lif. Helsingfors 1912
- Djurvänliga tankar: tillägnande Finlands söndagsskolelärare. Lutherska Söndagsskoleföreningen i Finland, Helsingfors 1915
- Barnens djurskyddslära. Söderström 1917
