= Elina Haavio-Mannila =

Finnish professor of sociology (1933–2025)

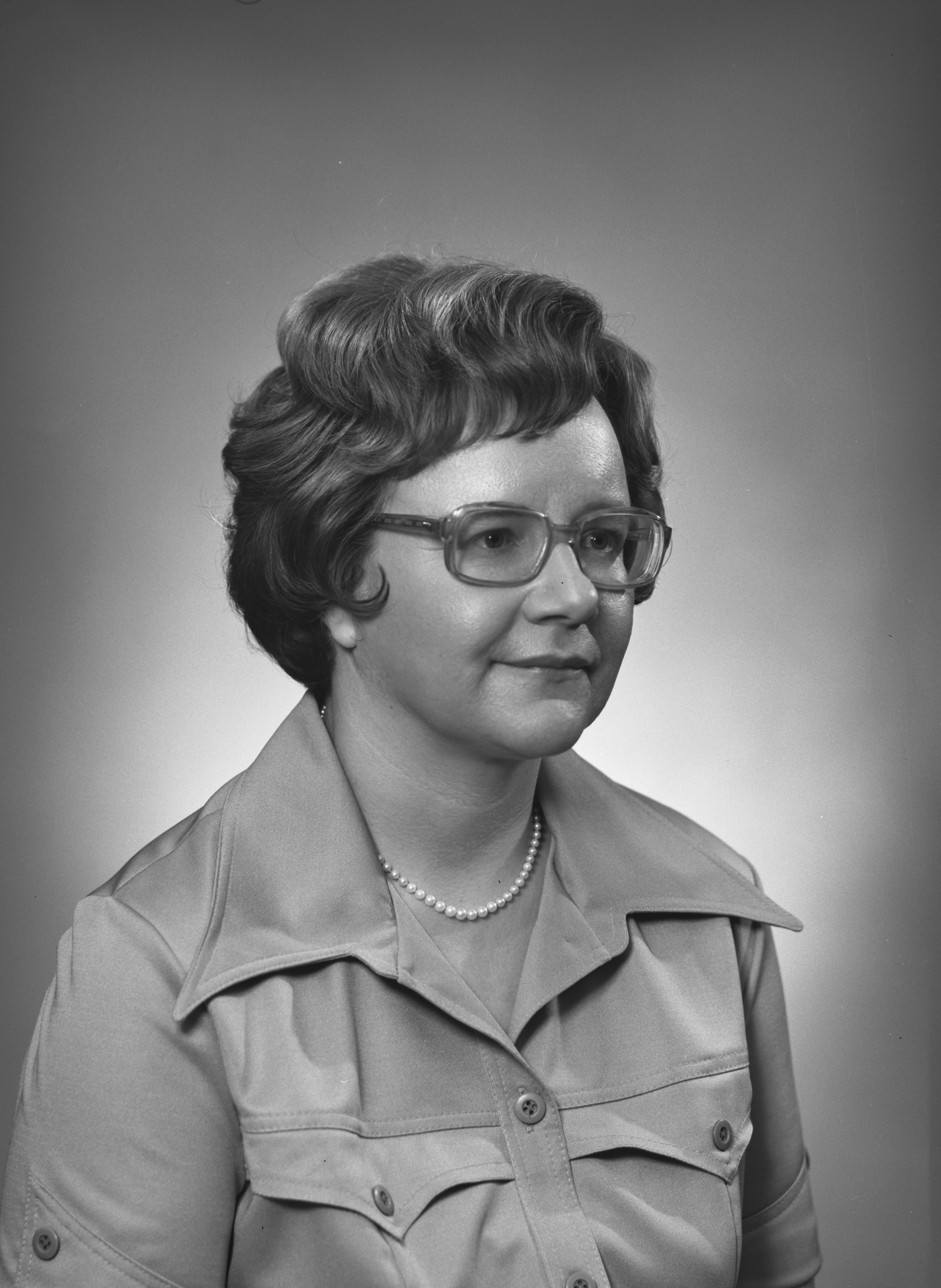
Haavio-Mannila in 1975

Elina Haavio-Mannila (3 August 1933 – 25 September 2025) was a Finnish social scientist and Professor Emerita of Sociology at the University of Helsinki, where she served as the Docent of Sociology (1965–1971), Assistant Professor (1971–1992), and Professor (1992–1998). She was known for researching gender roles and gender in Finnish life. Much of the research in the latter field was done together with Osmo Kontula. In 1958, she became the first woman in Finland to earn the Doctor in Social Sciences degree.

== Early life and education ==
Haavio was born in Helsinki on 3 August 1933. Her parents were Martti Haavio and Elsa Enäjärvi-Haavio.

== Career ==
Haavio-Mannila became attracted to sociology during her studies after reading an English-language elementary textbook on the subject. In her 1958 dissertation, Kylätappelut – Sosiologinen tutkimus Suomen kylätappeluinstituutiosta ("Village Fights – Sociological Research of the Finnish Village Fight Institute"), Haavio-Mannila wrote about village fights. Erik Allardt inspired her to study gender roles. In addition, she also studied the work of healthcare professionals and doctors, the role of the sexes and the roles in family, work, politics and alcohol use, and the adaptation of migrants.

In the 1950s and 1960s, sociology was an important and popular subject from the point of view of the development of Finnish society, and according to Haavio-Mannila's assessment, it still provides "useful information and explanatory models for the development of social life". In the 1960s, she became associated with the Yhdistys 9, Sexpo, and women's organizations. Haavio-Mannila's book, The Finnish woman and man (1968) is a pioneer in Finnish gender role research.

The early history of Finnish sociology was discussed by her in Roots of Sociology (1973) and in the History of Finnish Sociology (1992). Finnish sex, a 1993 book by Haavio-Mannila and Kontula, attracted attention at the end of the 1990s, as there was opposition by some to their research results, citing the relative rarity of homosexuality.

During her academic career, Haavio-Mannila was often in the media commenting on social issues and writing several books. She was a member of the Marriage Law, Alcohol Act, Working Time and Working Conditions Committees. She had held leadership positions in Finnish and international scientific organizations and continued to participate in international conferences through presentations of her ongoing research.

== Associations ==
Haavio-Mannila was elected a member of the Finnish Academy of Science and Letters in 1975. She had been a member of the Academia Europaea since 1993, and served as the head of the Finnish Academy of Sciences (1995–1996).

== Later life and death ==
In her retirement years, she had been actively involved in two broad international research projects: “Refer: Reproductive Health and Family Models in Russia, Estonia and Finland” and “Gentrans: Generations Chain – Study on Interaction and Helping each other with Large Baby Boomers and Their Children and Parents”. She characterized retirement research as volunteering, for which she had received congressional assistance with travel and a computer. Haavio-Mannila was following the development of computing for several decades and said she was "completely happy when I open my computer and find the files I need for the article, book, or message I have at hand". In her research, she was attracted by the statistical analysis she "designs at night by bedtime and in the morning before getting up".

On 27 September 2025, it was announced that Haavio-Mannila had died at the age of 93. According to the University of Helsinki, she died on 25 September 2025.

== Awards ==
- 2004, Warelius Award of the Finnish Bookwriters Association

== Selected works ==
- Haavio-Mannila, Elina: Kylätappelut – Sosiologinen tutkimus Suomen kylätappeluinstituutiosta. WSOY, 1958.
- Haavio-Mannila, Elina: Suomalainen nainen ja mies – asema ja muuttuvat roolit. WSOY 1968.
- Haavio-Mannila, Elina & Snicker, Raija: Päivätanssit. WSOY 1980. ISBN 951-0-10174-5.
- Haavio-Mannila, Elina, Jallinoja, Riitta & Strandell, Harriet: Perhe, työ ja tunteet – Ristiriitoja ja ratkaisuja. WSOY 1984. ISBN 951-0-12619-5.
- Haavio-Mannila, Elina et al. (toim.): Women in Nordic Politics. Pergamon Press 1985.
- Haavio-Mannila, Elina: Työpaikan rakkaussuhteet. WSOY 1988. ISBN 951-0-15078-9.
- Alapuro, Risto & Alestalo, Matti & Haavio-Mannila, Elina (toim.): Suomalaisen sosiologian historia. Porvoo Helsinki Juva: WSOY, 1992. ISBN 951-0-17996-5.
- Kontula, Osmo & Haavio-Mannila, Elina (toim.): Suomalainen seksi: Tietoa suomalaisten sukupuolielämän muutoksesta. WSOY, 1993. ISBN 951-0-18672-4.
- Haavio-Mannila, Elina & Kontula, Osmo: Seksin trendit meillä ja naapureissa. WSOY, 2001. ISBN 951-0-26145-9. Myös englanniksi Sexual Trends in the Baltic Sea Area. The Family Federation of Finland 2003. ISBN 952-9605-99-4.
- Kontula, Osmo & Haavio-Mannila, Elina: Intohimon hetkiä: Seksuaalisen läheisyyden kaipuu ja täyttymys omaelämäkertojen kuvaamana. WSOY, 2001. ISBN 951-0-22261-5.
- Haavio-Mannila, Elina & Kontula, Osmo & Rotkirch, Anna: Sexual Lifestyles in the Twentieth Century. Palgrave 2002. ISBN 0-333-794184.

== See also ==
- List of firsts in Finland
