= Eugenie Lisitzin =

Finnish physicist (1905–1989)

- Born: November 13, 1905. Dresden, Germany
- Died: October 28, 1989 (aged 83); Helsinki, Finland
- Occupations: Physicist, Oceanographer
- Years active: 1935–1975
- Notable work: Sea Level Changes (1974)

Eugenie Lisitzin (November 13, 1905 – October 28, 1989) was a Finnish physical oceanographer active in the mid-20th century. She was the first woman in Finland to earn a PhD in physics (1938) and join the Finnish Society of Sciences and Letters (1960). She also was the first acting director of a scientific department of the Finnish government (Finnish Institute of Marine Research, 1961–1963). She was best known for her research on sea-level variation and for her influential monograph Sea-Level Changes (1974).

== Early life ==
Lisitzin was born in Dresden, Germany, on 13 November 1905, to the 40-year-old mining engineer Gregorius Lisitzin, who was still in Germany after graduating from the Bergakademie Freiberg 13 years earlier, and Eugenie Maria de Ratomska. Her father's scientific activities took the family to Belgium, Sweden, and eventually back to Karelia (then in Finland) where the family lived in Sortavala. Gregorius had studied nearby in Vyborg, maintained absentee status through the 1900s, and later became an honorary member of the Technical Club; he was also influential in the Käkisalmi area where he was on the board of several railroad companies until Karelia became part of Russia.

== Education ==
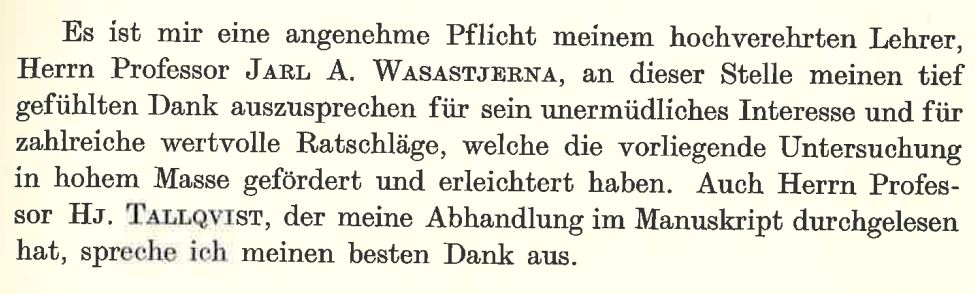
The dedication from Lisitzin's 1938 dissertation, the first in physics by a Finnish woman

Like her father, Eugenie began her formal studies in Vyborg, graduating in 1926 from the Vyborg Swedish-Speaking Girls' School. She then enrolled at the University of Helsinki, where she obtained the degree of Filosofian kandidaatti (Master’s level degree) in 1929. Nine years later, she became the first woman to receive a doctorate in physics in Finland in 1938; she received honor's distinctions in other subjects as well. It also made her one of the first 40 Finnish women to earn a doctorate in any discipline. Her advisor was professor Jarl Axel Wasastjerna, later an envoy and industrial leader, whom she thanked for "tireless interest and numerous valuable suggestions". (Note: Translated from German: "meinen tief gefühleten Dank ... für sein unermüdliches Interesse und für zahlreiche wertvolle Ratschläge") Her 121 page thesis, written in German, was entitled "On the ionization potentials of the elements in different ionization states", (Note: "Uber die ionisierungsspannungen der Elemente in verschiedenen Ionisierungszustanden", Helsinki 1938) and gave little hint of her future as an oceanographer. However, she also thanked the prolific mathematician and fisheries inspector Hjalmar Tallqvist for reviewing early drafts of her work, who may have helped her find a position after graduation.

== Career ==
After graduation, she worked for the Finnish Institute of Marine Research for 40 years, beginning in 1933, and serving as the head of the Sea Level Department from 1955 until her retirement in 1972. From 1955 until her retirement in 1972, she headed the section responsible for sea-level research. Lisitzin's research on sea level variation included over a hundred professional publications. In her own institutional history, she modestly described her research until the late 1950s as focused only on the Baltic Sea, and "reasonably narrow, though regionally thorough". (Note: Translated from the Finnish "tavallaan aiheellisesti suppeat, mutta alueellisesti verrattain laajat.") Be that as it may, her monograph on forecasting water temperatures in the Archipelago Sea had sold in bookstores since 1939, and her study on the factors affecting the sea level of the Gulf of Bothnia had been jointly presented to the Finnish Society of Scientists by director Erik Palmén and professor Einar Stenij in 1945. The last 15 years of her career developed a wider scope, including an important review of global tide data collected during the International Geophysical Year with fellow female oceanographer June Pattullo (Oregon State University), concluding that seasonal variation in Pacific sea level is influenced by air pressure above ~40 degrees latitude, but primarily isostatic below. She later generalized and expanded these findings into a short monograph that included the rest of the world's oceans. This work was carried out after she represented the institute at the first International Oceanographic Congress (1959) in New York City, and during a six-month stay at the Scripps Institution of Oceanography in San Diego, California.

In 1960, she was elected to the Finnish Society of Sciences and Letters, becoming the first woman admitted to its Mathematics and Physics Section, and earned her an honorary professorship in 1965. In 1961, director Ilmo Hela asked her to be acting director during his two year sabbatical in Monaco. This required an official decree from the Finnish government allowing women to direct a scientific department, which was passed just in time, making her the first woman to hold such a leadership position in a Finnish state scientific institution. Her studies culminated in the textbook "Sea Level Changes" (1974), which was notable for synthesizing meteorological and seasonal factors with long-term secular trends (even before the effects of global warming were widely appreciated), recalculating the rate of land uplift across Scandinavia, geological evidence of widespread change elsewhere, seiche waves, and anthropological discussion of legends of universal floods. The book examined meteorological, seasonal, and geological factors affecting sea level, including post-glacial isostatic rebound in Scandinavia and geological evidence from other regions. The volume became a widely cited reference work in oceanography and geophysics

== Later life ==
She remained active into her seventies, writing a history of the Institute of Marine Research in 1978. Eugenie Lisitzin died in Helsinki on 28 October 1989 at age 83.

She is remembered as a pioneer of physical oceanography in Finland and as an important figure in the advancement of women in Finnish science. Her research laid foundational groundwork for modern studies of long-term sea-level change.
