= Agnes Tschetschulin =

Finnish musician (1859–1942)

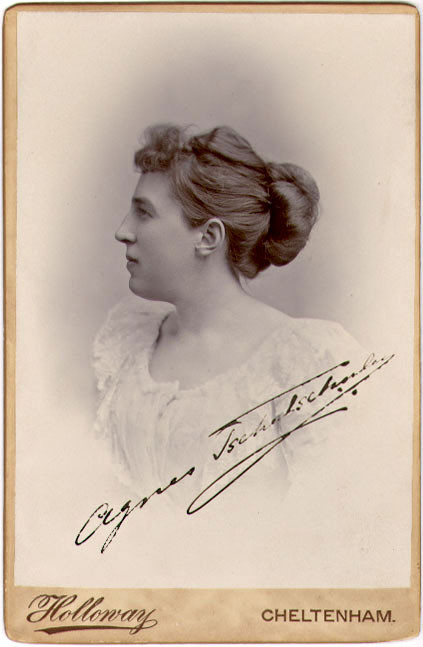
Tschetschulin c. 1900

Agnes Tschetschulin (24 February 1859 – 23 April 1942) was a Finnish composer and violinist who toured internationally.

Tschetschulin was born in Helsinki to Feodor and Hilda Eckstein Tschetschulin. She had three sisters: Maria, Melanie, and Eugenie. Hilda hosted salons with musical performances and discussions. Feodor owned a steamboat company. After his death in 1871, his oldest daughter Maria Tschetschulin became the first woman in Finland to attend the University of Helsinki, where she hoped to gain the skills she needed to help support her family.

Agnes Tschetschulin studied music at the Helsinki Music Institute (today the Sibelius Academy) from 1882 to 1885, where she was one of the first four graduates. She received a grant from the Finnish government to travel to Berlin to study at the Königliche Hochschule für Musik (today the Berlin University of the Arts). Her teachers included Woldemar Bargiel (the half-brother of Clara Schumann) Heinrich von Herzogenberg, Ernst Joachim, Joseph Joachim, Gustav Niemann, Anton Sitt, Philipp Spitta, Martin Wegelius, and Emanuel Wirth.

After finishing school, Tschetschulin spent several years touring with an all-female string quartet organized by Marie Soldat, who played first violin. Tschetschulin played second violin, Gabriele Roy played viola and Lucy Campbell played cello. The group was managed by the Herman Wolff Agency, which also managed the Berlin Philharmonic. The group was billed as the world's first all-female professional string quartet.

In 1892, Tschetschulin began teaching violin at the Cheltenham Ladies' College in England. In 1904, she became a British citizen and moved to London to work as a freelance musician. She returned to Finland during World War I, then emigrated to Stockholm, where she lived until her death in 1942. She was buried in Stockholm with her longtime companion, pianist Tora Hwass (1861–1918).

Tschetschulin's music was published by N. Simrock and Skandinavisk Musikforlag. Her compositions include:

== Chamber ==
- Alla Zingaresca (violin and piano)
- Berceuse (violin and piano)
- Puszta Film
- Romance (violin and piano)
- Valse gracieuse

== Orchestral ==
- Britain's Sons (march)
- Gavotte (violin and orchestra or piano)
- March of the Boys of Vöyri

== Piano ==
- March for the Finnish Guard on its return from war 1877–78 (also arranged for wind band)
- Stemmingsbillede (Mood Picture)
- Valse gracieuse

== Vocal ==
- at least three lieder
- Prayer
