= Lydia Sesemann =

Finnish chemist

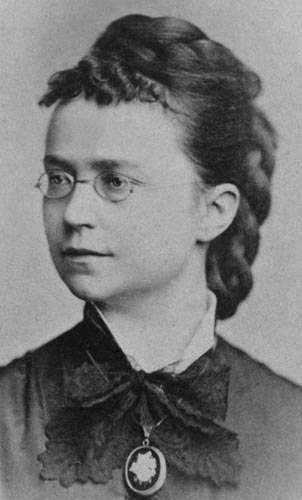
Lydia Sesemann

Lydia Sesemann (14 February 1845, Vyborg – 28 March 1925, Munich) was a Finnish doctor of chemistry. She was the first woman from Finland to obtain a doctoral degree.

== Life ==
Lydia Sesemann was born in Vyborg in a German-speaking merchant family. The family had come to Vyborg already in 1661 from Lübeck but had continued to use German as their first language. In Old Finland, the part of Finland she grew up in, there was a stronger tradition in the upper strata of society of letting women receive formal education than in the rest of Finland, an influence from ideals among the Russian elite at the time. Sesemann attended a private school in Vyborg and after the death of her father in 1865 left the country. She spent some time in Germany and began to study chemistry at the University of Zurich in Switzerland in 1869. In 1874 she defended her doctoral thesis at the university and thus became the first woman from Finland to obtain a doctoral degree, and the first women to obtain a PhD in chemistry.

The University of Zurich received several female students and many of them came from the Russian Empire (of which Finland at the time was a part). Lydia Sesemann is known to have lived in a part of the city popular among other students from Russia. Some of the Russian students were suspected of political intrigues and the Russian government in May 1873 declared that the female students for political reasons must leave the university before the end of the year. Lydia Sesemann didn't do this, and was thus in practice prohibited from returning to Finland. She spent the rest of her life living in Germany. She did not further pursue a scientific career; there were hardly any possibilities for a woman at the time to do this. Although contemporary newspapers in Vyborg mention her achievement, she was not widely recognised in her home country at the time.
