= Maria Tschetschulin =

First female university student in Northern Europe

Maria Tschetschulina
- Мария Фёдоровна Чечулина
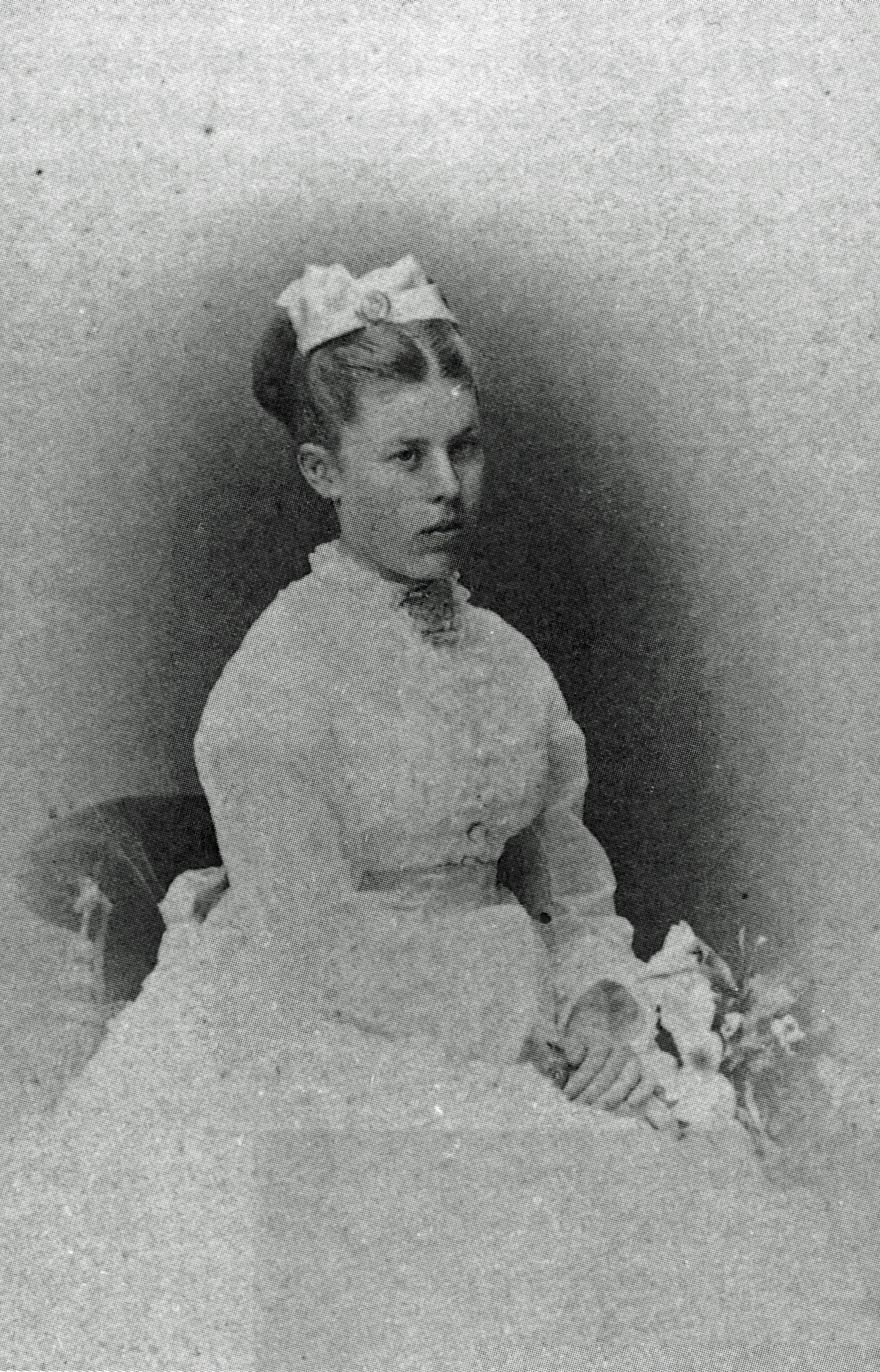
- Photography of Maria Tschetschulina around the time of her university enrollment
- Born: 31 July 1852; Helsinki (Helsingfors), Grand Duchy of Finland, Russian Empire
- Died: 19 September 1917 (aged 65); Helsinki (Helsingfors), Grand Duchy of Finland, Russian Republic

Maria Tschetschulin (Russian: Мария Фёдоровна Чечулина, romanized: Maria Fyodorovna Tschetschulina) (31 July 1852 Helsinki, Grand Duchy of Finland, Russian Empire – 19 September 1917 Helsinki, Grand Duchy of Finland, Russian Republic) was the first woman to attend university in Northern Europe. In 1870, she successfully passed the matriculation examination and became the first female student at the Imperial Alexander University (now the University of Helsinki), where she studied until 1873.

== Early life ==
Maria Fyodorovna Tschetschulina was born on 31 July 1852 in Helsininki into the family of Commercial Counsellor Fyodor Fyodorovich Tschetschulin, a Russian merchant, shipowner, and brick factory owner whose family had settled in Tornio in the Grand Duchy of Finland. Tschetschulin received burgher rights in Helsinki in 1844 after moving there from Tornio. In the 1850s, he also owned several steamships. He gained notoriety in Helsinki following a massive explosion at his gunpowder store in December 1866, which shattered roughly 50,000 windows across the city. In 1870, he donated to the construction of the Old Student House in Helsinki. Her mother, Hilda Axelina Maria Tschetschulin (née Eckstein), was the daughter of a former army officer who had moved from Stockholm to Helsinki in the 1830s and become a successful foreign merchant.

== Education ==
Maria Fyodorovna attended a German girls' school, a French girls' school, and the Helsinki Lyceum.

To enter the Imperial Alexander University, the only university then operating in the Grand Duchy of Finland, one had to pass the matriculation examination ("student examination"), which women were not permitted to take. In January 1870, Fyodor Tschetschulin submitted a petition to the university, requesting that an exception be made for his daughter. His petition was prompted not only by her abilities, but also by the fact that in the interior governorates of the Russian Empire women had already gained the right in the late 1850s to attend universities as auditors. The university's academic council, consisting of twelve ordinary professors chaired by the rector, reviewed and approved the petition, resolving to grant admission rights not only to Tschetschulina, but to all women. In the consistory's view, female students were to have the same rights and duties as men, except regarding the organization of student life outside the institution. However, the university chancellor disagreed and approved the petition only to Tschetschulina alone.

=== Admission to the university ===
The discussion of this issue generated wide public resonance, and newspapers began writing about Tschetschulina in the beginning of May, when it became known that she had received permission to take the examination. The Finnish-language Helsinki newspaper Uusi Suometar, in a note titled "Rights for Women", suggested that this permission might be connected with the upcoming debate over how women's access to the university would be organized. When Tschetschulina passed the examination on 18 May 1870, she attracted even greater attention. She enrolled in the Historical-Philological Section of the Faculty of Philosophy, where she studied languages and humanities. She demonstrated strong knowledge across the required subjects, including Latin, history, mathematics and modern languages and passed with high marks. Following the exam, students greeted her with singing and applause; news of the event quickly spread throughout Helsinki, and Tschetschulina became a well-known figure overnight.

In the Swedish-language Helsinki newspaper Hufvudstadsbladet, published the following day, an anonymous laudatory poem dedicated to Tschetschulina was printed, stating that "men and women are equal for the kingdom of the spirit", and that along the path blazed by the "brave girl" others would soon follow, though "the honor of the pioneer will forever remain hers". Numerous newspapers across Europe reported on Tschetschulina, presenting the event largely as an extraordinary milestone, as there had previously been no female university students in either Finland or the Scandinavian countries. Helsinki's Folkwännen printed a report on the very top of its front page announcing that, for the first time in Finland, a woman had passed the matriculation examination: "Among those who have completed all the prescribed procedures for admission to the university, there is, in particular, also a woman — Miss Tschetschulin," the newspaper wrote. "May others follow her example." The Vyborg newspaper Wiborgs Tidning wrote that everyone who rejoiced in the progress of their country should recognize the enormous significance of what had occurred, since "this single matriculation examination will serve as a reminder to thousands of men of the natural rights of women". The Turku newspaper Sanomia Turusta, noting that this was the first case of a woman becoming a university student in the Grand Duchy of Finland, further declared that the day would remain forever in the history of education and that the barrier preventing women from sharing in the same civilization as men had now been overcome. The Finnish writer and historian Zacharias Topelius described her achievement as a "quiet revolution".

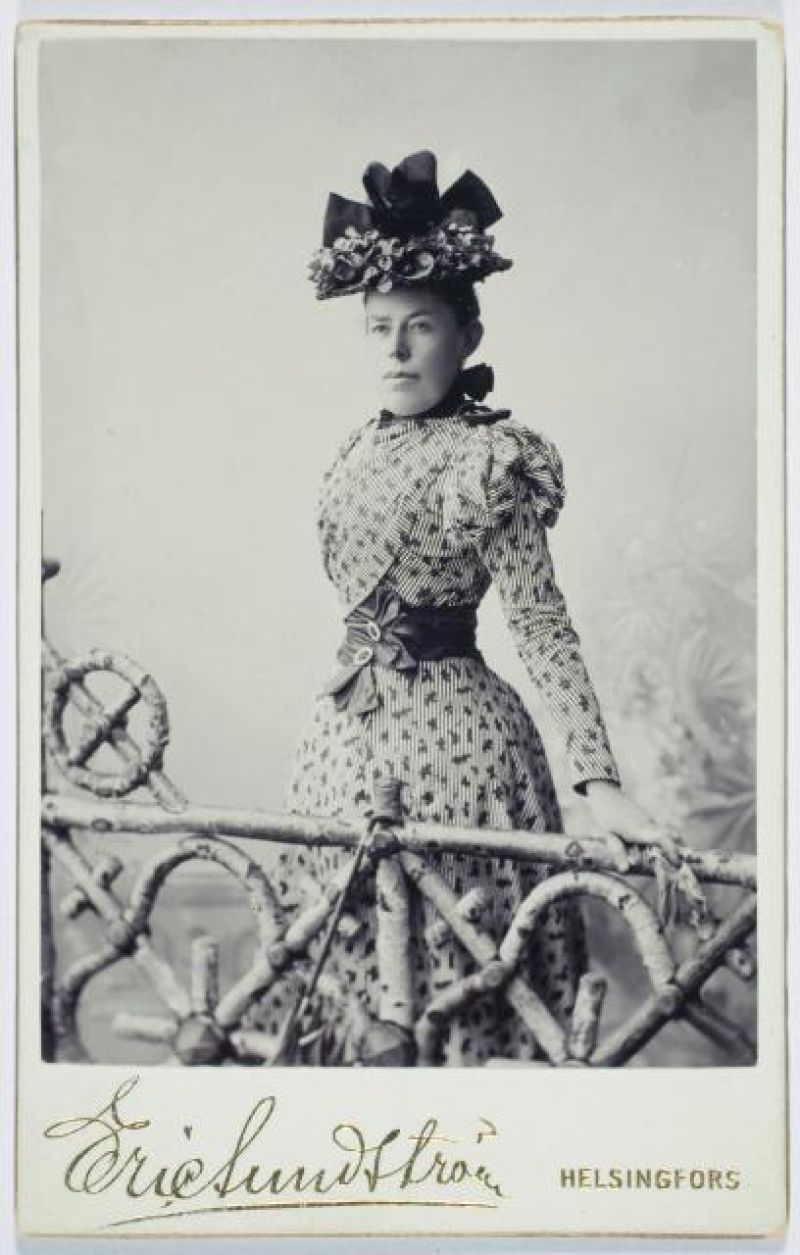

Among those who congratulated Tschetschulina on entering the university was Swedish Princess Louise, the daughter of King Charles XV, who a year earlier had married Crown Prince Frederick and become Crown Princess of Denmark (and later Queen of Denmark). Once in childhood, when six-year-old Maria was spending the summer with her mother in Sweden on the Skagerrak coast in the small resort town of Strömstad, she was invited to be a playmate for the princess, who was nearly her age. From then on, they corresponded, and Maria also visited Louise in Stockholm. It was after meeting the princess that Maria began studying Latin.

=== End of studies ===
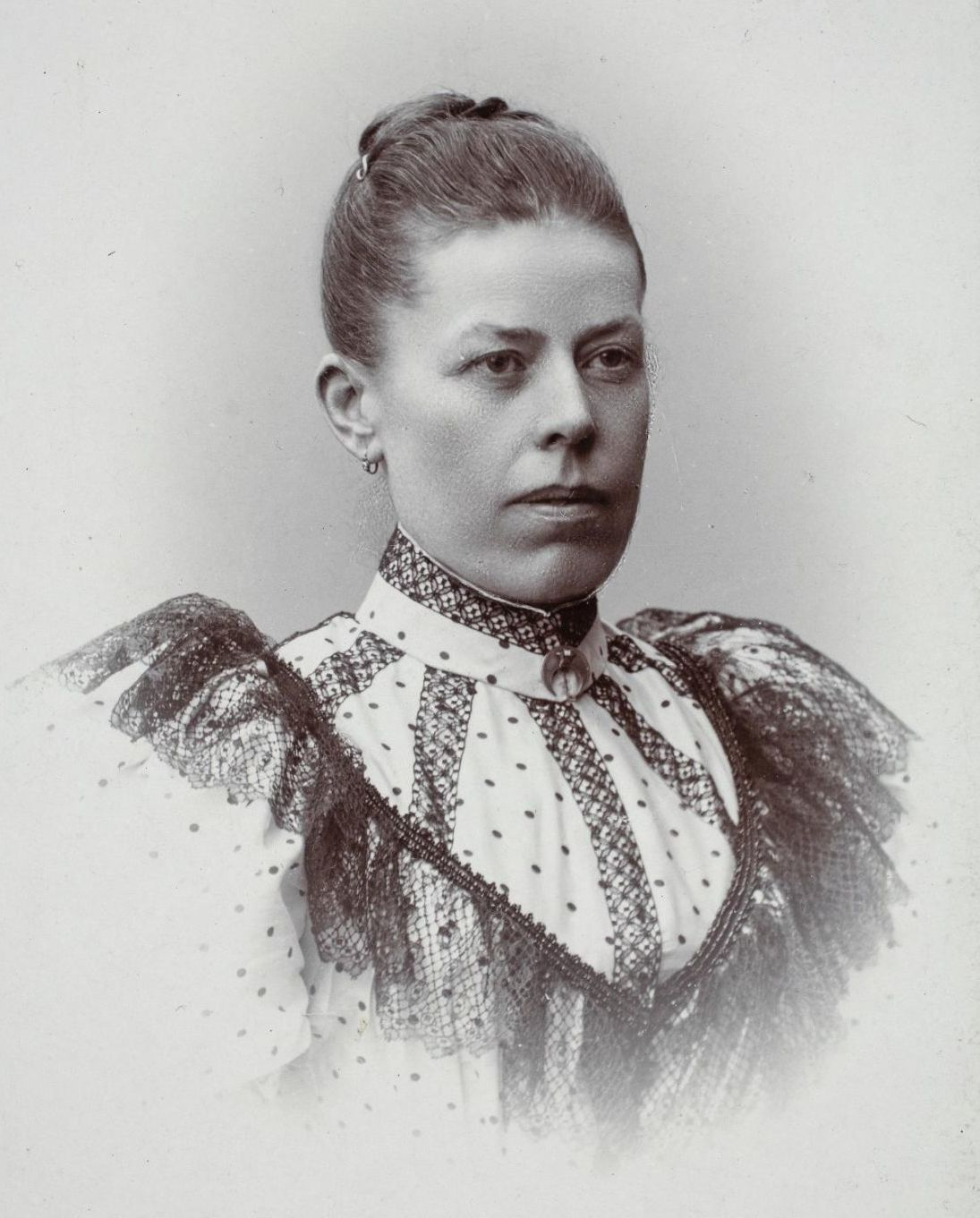
Photography of Maria Tschetschulina from the 1870s

A year after Tschetschulina entered the university, in 1871, her father, Fyodor Tschetschulin, died. Soon after his death, his business went bankrupt, leaving the family in financial difficulty. For a time, plans were considered to relocate the entire family to Berlin, where the younger daughters could continue studying German and pursue music.

Later, in October 1873, Tschetschulina was forced to leave the university due to family circumstances. As the eldest daughter in the family, all responsibility for supporting the household fell on her. To provide for her mother, grandmother, and three younger sisters, she worked as a bookkeeper, business correspondent, and language teacher. From 1889, she held the position at the major shipping company Finland Steamship Company, where she was responsible, among other things, for correspondence with foreign counterparties, as she spoke six languages. She was described as a highly conscientious worker and a "true ornament" to her workplace.

She died on 19 September 1917 in Helsinki at the age of 65. Buried at the Helsinki Orthodox Cemetery in the Lapinlahti district of Helsinki. In an article titled "The First Female Student of Finland" in the October issue of the Helsinki journal Nutid, the writer Constance Ullner wrote that "nowadays, when so many women study at university, it is hard to understand that there was a time when only men were allowed to". Ullner described Tschetschulina as a person of integrity who followed her chosen path with unfailing courage, and as a "likable pioneer" whom other women followed.

She opened the gates to the kingdom of knowledge for her fellow countrywomen.

— Constance Ullner

== Family ==
Maria was one of four daughters in the Chechulin family. Of her three younger sisters, the best known is Agnes (1859–1942), who became a professional violinist and composer and gave concerts across Europe, later served as a professor of violin in United Kingdom. The other two sisters became teachers: Melania (1867–1952), who worked as a language teacher, and Evgenia (d. 1942) who taught music. None of the four Chechulina sisters ever married.

== Sources ==
- Topelius, Zacharias (2004). Knapas, Rainer (ed.). Finlands krönika 1860–1878 (in Swedish). Helsingfors: Society of Swedish Literature in Finland. ISBN 951-583-101-6.
- Väisänen, Maija; Mäkelä-Alitalo, Anneli (6 September 2001). "Tschetschulin, Maria (1852–1917)". Kansallisbiografia (in Finnish).
- Holmlund, Sofia (2 June 2017). "Drömmen om universitetet fick hon ge upp". Hufvudstadsbladet (in Swedish).
- Ullner, Constance (October 1917). "Finlands första kvinnliga student". Nutid (in Swedish).
- "[Obituary of Maria Tschetschulin]". Veckans Krönika (in Swedish). 1917.
