= Agnes Sjöberg =

Finnish veterinarian

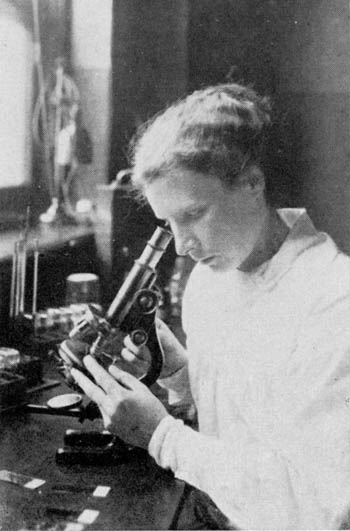
- Born: 15 November 1888; Kauhajoki, Finland
- Died: 21 August 1964 (aged 75); Seinäjoki, Finland
- Known for: Veterinarian

Agnes Hildegard Sjöberg (15 November 1888 Kauhajoki - 21 August 1964 Seinäjoki) was a Finnish veterinarian. She graduated as a veterinarian and was the first woman in Europe and likely the first woman in the world to obtain the PhD degree in veterinary medicine. During her career, Sjöberg worked as a municipal veterinarian in Somero and Närpes and had a private veterinary clinic for many years. Sjöberg was subjected to prejudice and discrimination by colleagues, and her pioneering work as a female veterinarian was not recognized until much after her death.

== Early life and education ==
Agnes Sjöberg's parents were Johan B. Sjöberg and Karin Norrgård. They had an advanced model farm in Kauhajoki, which included a school of anmimal husbandry and strawberry plantations. Agnes first attended school at home under the guidance of a governess and in 1900–1905 at the Vaasa Swedish School for Girls. She would have liked to continue as a student, but due to her father's opposition, she continued her studies at the Vaasa School of Home Economics. After graduating, she managed her parents' household for three years, after which her father bowed and let her daughter read as a student. Agnes Sjöberg graduated as a private student in 1911 from the Kuopio Swedish Co-educational School.

== Veterinary studies ==
As a child, Sjöberg had dreamed of becoming a veterinarian. She had followed the teaching at the school of animal husbandry at her home farm and got acquainted with, among other things, the anatomy of the cattle. With the help of her aunt, she was able to assist John Engdahl, the district veterinarian in Huittinen, observing the work of a veterinarian. At the end of the internship, Dr. Engdahl admitted that he was prejudiced at first but recommended her to study in the field. On Engdahl's recommendation, Sjöberg was promised a place at the University of Zurich . Arriving in Switzerland, however, she was disappointed, as the university had just banned Russian citizens - that is, also Finns - from studying at the university for fear of revolutionaries.

However, Sjöberg received a letter of recommendation from the University of Zurich, which allowed her to begin her veterinary studies in Germany at the University of Dresden in the autumn of 1911. The female student was admitted to study on an experimental basis among 300 male students. At the same time, there were some thirty other Finnish veterinary students in Dresden who were hostile to Sjöberg. Due to pressure and to get rid of other Finnish students, Sjöberg moved to the University of Berlin the following year, where there were only a few Finnish students. In 1913, Sjöberg applied to the university for permission to complete a bachelor's degree in veterinary medicine. Sjöberg's gender again caused problems, as according to university rules, only a male student could complete a degree. The matter went to the level of the ministry, and in the summer of 1913 an official decision was made that a woman student could also graduate as a veterinarian in Germany.

The outbreak of World War I in 1914 delayed Agnes's graduation until the spring of 1916. During the war, however, she was able to work at the University Animal Clinic while men were at the front. After graduating she began to work on her dissertation and defended it in Leipzig in 1918. The title of the dissertation was Klinische und chemisch-mikroskopische Untersuchungen des Augensekretes der Pferde.

== Career in Finland ==
In the same year that Sjöberg received her doctorate, she returned to Finland. She took on the position of municipal veterinarian, first in Somero in 1918–1920 and then in Närpes in 1920–1923. In 1923, she traveled abroad again for further studies, first to London, then to the United States, and finally to Germany and Austria. During her trip, she became acquainted with schools and clinics in the field, and engaged in work and further research. One result of the trip was a study on ruminant parasites. Sjöberg returned to Finland again in 1926, first opening a private veterinary practice in Kauhajoki where she operated in 1926–1932 and then in Kurikka in 1932–1935. After working as a meat inspector in Ilmajoki in 1935–1938, she eventually settled in Seinäjoki, where she had her own animal clinic from 1938 until 1955.

Among her clients Sjöberg was popular, but this was not the case with many of her veterinary colleagues. Early in her career, she quarreled with Rainer Stenius, long-time chairman of the Veterinary Association and advisor to the Department of Veterinary Medicine of the Ministry of Agriculture. After the Board of Honor of the Veterinary Association accused Sjöberg of uncollegial conduct, she resigned from the association, embittered.

In 1918, the Finnish news magazine Suomen Kuvalehti made the following remarks:

"Her medical practice in Germany, where she has treated even 'large' domestic animals, horses, cows, etc., thus proves that a woman's strength is sufficient for also this profession."

Sjöberg's pioneering work as a female veterinarian was not recognized until much after her death. A street close to the Faculty of Veterinary Medicine in the Viikki district of Helsinki was named Agnes Sjöbergin katu in 2001, and in her native Kauhajoki Sööpärintie is named after her.

== Personal life ==
Agnes Sjöberg married Veikko Klaavu in 1928. It was a short-lived marriage; she had twin sons, whom she raised alone.

== Works ==
- Clinical and chemical-microscopic analysis of the growth of the pens . Dissertation. 1918.
- Europe's first female veterinarian. Agnes Hildegard Sjöberg, Doctor of Veterinary Medicine. Life from childhood to silver hair. Vaasa 1964. (Visible edition: Lasipalatsi, 2000.) List of publications at the end of the work.
