= Saint Henry's Way =

Pilgrimage path in Finland

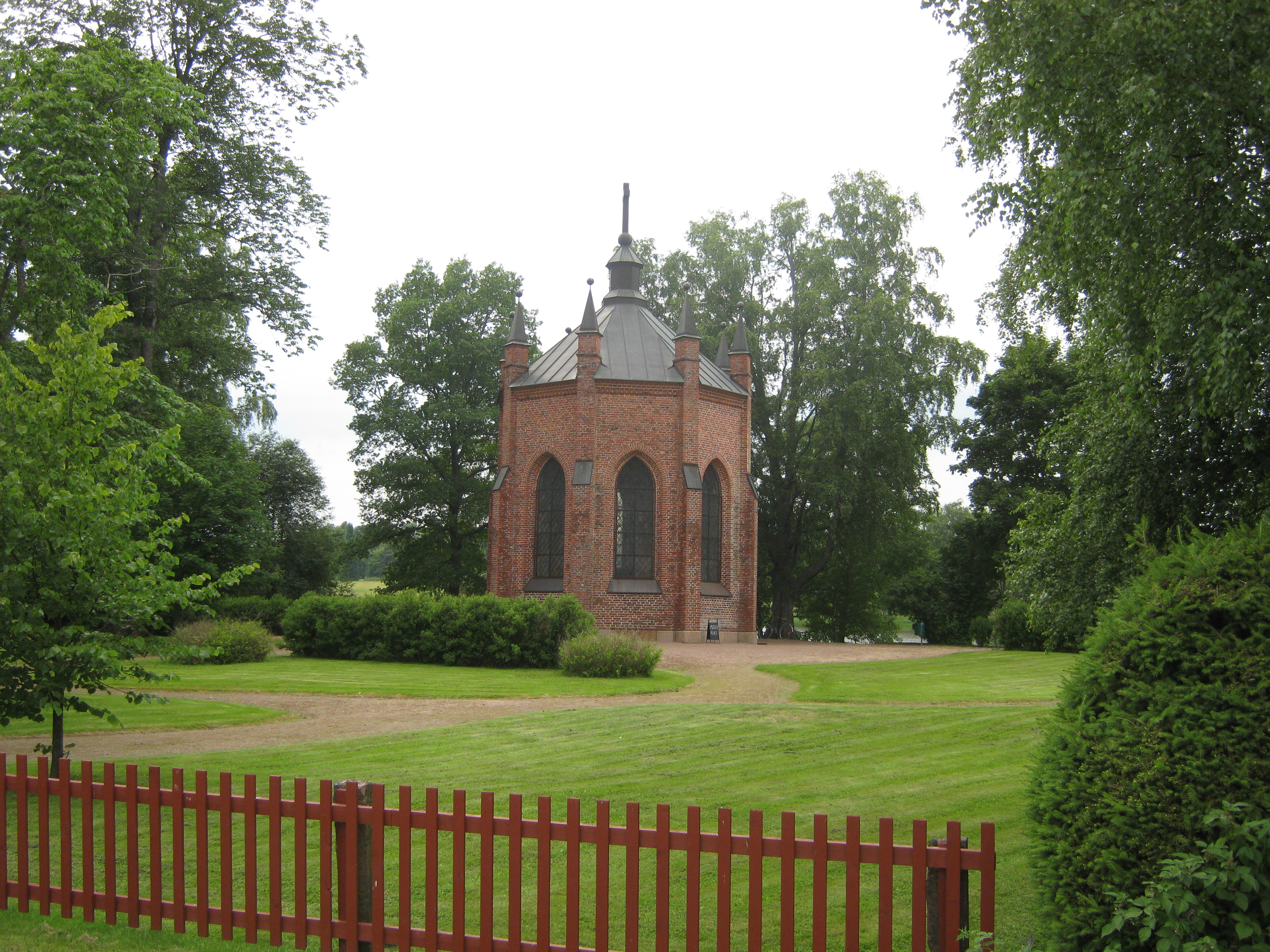
- St. Henry's Chapel
- Length: 140 km (87 mi)
- Location: Southwest Finland and Satakunta, Finland
- Trailheads: Turku Cathedral, Turku; Kirkkokari, Köyliö; St. Henry's Chapel, Kokemäki
- Use: Hiking, cycling
- Season: Summer

Saint Henry's Way (Finnish: Pyhän Henrikin tie, Swedish: S:t Henriksleden) is a pilgrim path in the regions of Southwest Finland and Satakunta in Finland.

== History ==
Saint Henry's Way was born as a result of the canonization of Bishop Henry, who was allegedly murdered in the ice of Lake Köyliö in the winter of 1156. The original Medieval route started from the Kirkkokari island in Köyliö, the site of Henry's murder, and ended at his burial site, the Nousiainen Church. The route was later expanded to a total length of 140 kilometres, leading from Turku Cathedral to the St. Henry's Chapel in Kokemäki. The first pilgrimages were made in the 13th century.

== The route ==
Saint Henry's Way consists of three sections. The first two are "Nunnapolku" (the Nun's Path) from Turku to Nousiainen and "Sant Henrikin tie" (St. Henry's Road) between Nousiainen and Köyliö. The last part from Köyliö to Kokemäki follows the tracks of historical Huovintie road, which dates back to the 9th century. The Nun's Path begins from the Turku Cathedral and travels via Koroinen to Nousiainen Church. The second part leads mostly through the inhabited marsh and forest areas which are located between the regions of Southwest Finland and Satakunta. After joining the Huovintie road in Säkylä, Saint Henry's Way travels along the Lake Köyliö finally ending at Kokemäki.

== Present pilgrimages ==
Today the Saint Henry's Way is a marked path for hikers and cyclists. The Catholic Church in Finland organizes an annual pilgrimage from Turku to Köyliö. It ends on a Mass held in the Kirkkokari island on the last pre-Midsummer Sunday. An ecumenical pilgrimage used to be organized every three years between Turku and Kokemäki. It was last arranged in June 2012.
