= St. Henry's Chapel =

Neogothic style brick chapel in the town of Kokemäki, Finland

Coordinates: 61.257657°N 22.370052°E

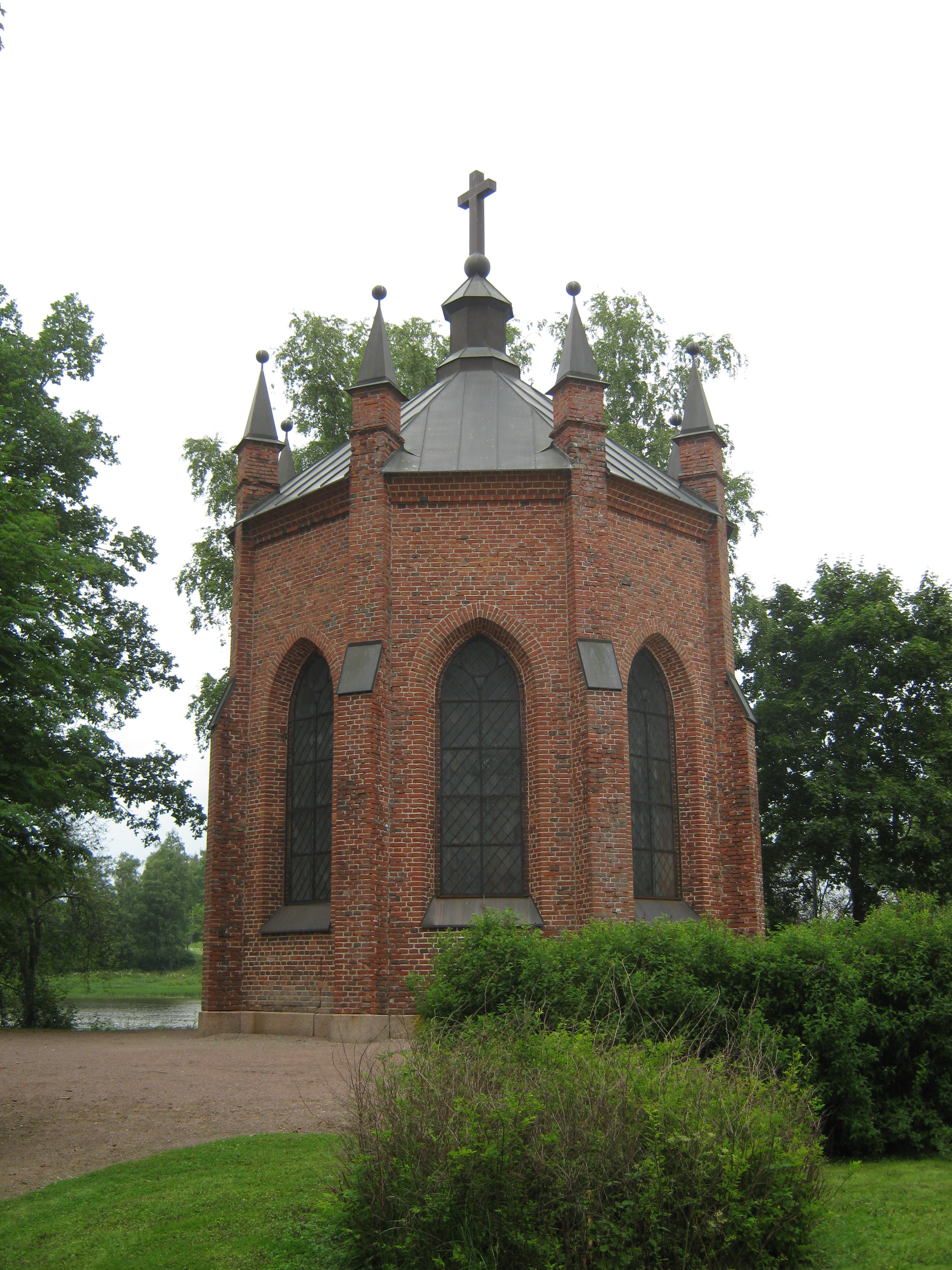
St. Henry's Chapel.

St. Henry's Chapel (Finnish: Pyhän Henrikin kappeli) is a neogothic style brick chapel in the town of Kokemäki, Finland. The chapel was built in 1857 to cover a medieval wooden granary which was used by St. Henry, the first bishop of Finland. The chapel is located by the river Kokemäenjoki, one kilometre east of the town center of Kokemäki.

== The granary ==
According to legends, St. Henry spent his last night at the granary, before he was allegedly murdered by peasant Lalli on 20 January 1156. The small wooden building was later converted to a chapel which was the final destination of pilgrimage route Saint Henry's Way.

Dendrochronological analysis were made of the logs in 1990 and 2003. The analysis showed the oldest ones were cut in 1472. Since all of the logs were not analyzed and most of the original may have been replaced due to decomposition, it is still possible the building dates back to 12th century. Even if the granary was built in late 15th century, it is still the oldest remaining wooden building in Finland.

== The brick chapel ==
Senate of Finland decided in 1839 to conserve the granary as a national heritage. The octagon-shaped brick chapel was built in 1850s by the drawings of architect Pehr Johan Gylich and the wooden building was placed inside. The chapel was opened on 18 June 1857, at the 700th anniversary of Christianisation of Finland. The park was designed by architect Georg Theodor von Chiewitz. In 2002, the bust of St. Henry was revealed at the park. It is a work of Finnish sculptor Emil Cedercreutz (1879–1949).

Foundations of the brick chapel are slightly damaged during the decades and it is now leaning about 25 centimetres towards the river. The chapel's surroundings are the assumed location of Iron Age town Teljä and the site of Medieval village Ylistaro, which was destroyed by fire in the 1830s.

== Gallery ==
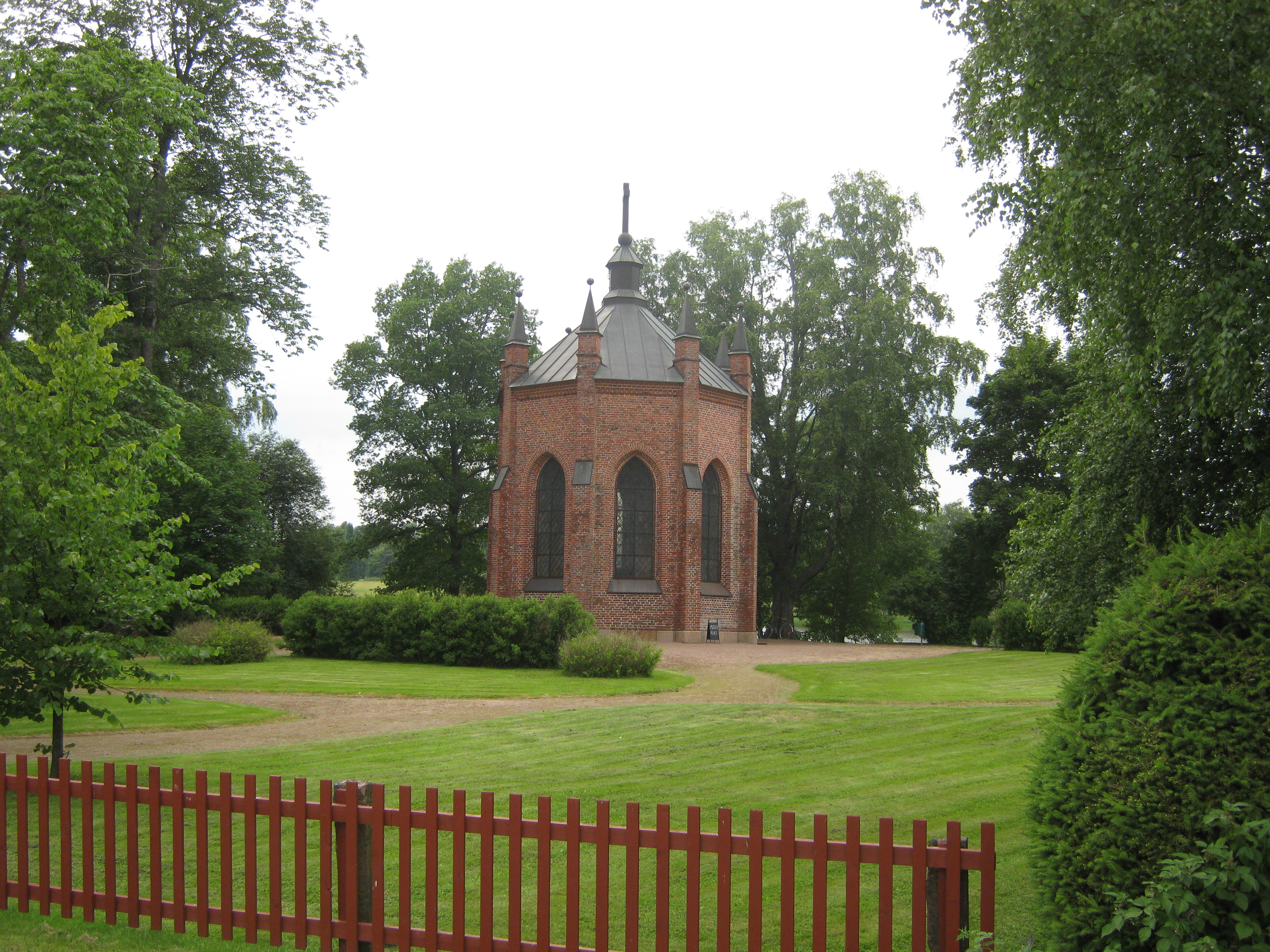
The park

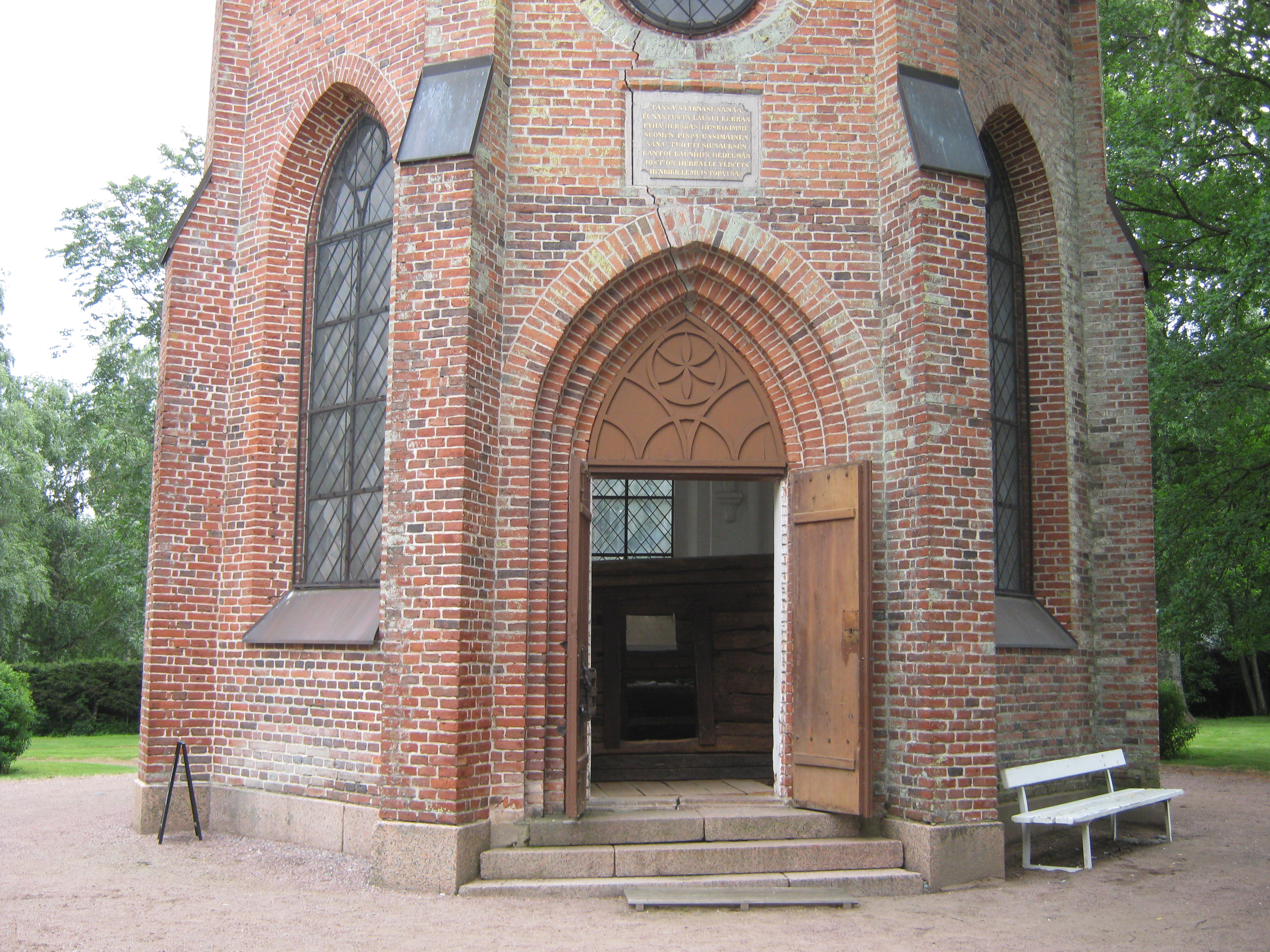
Entrance

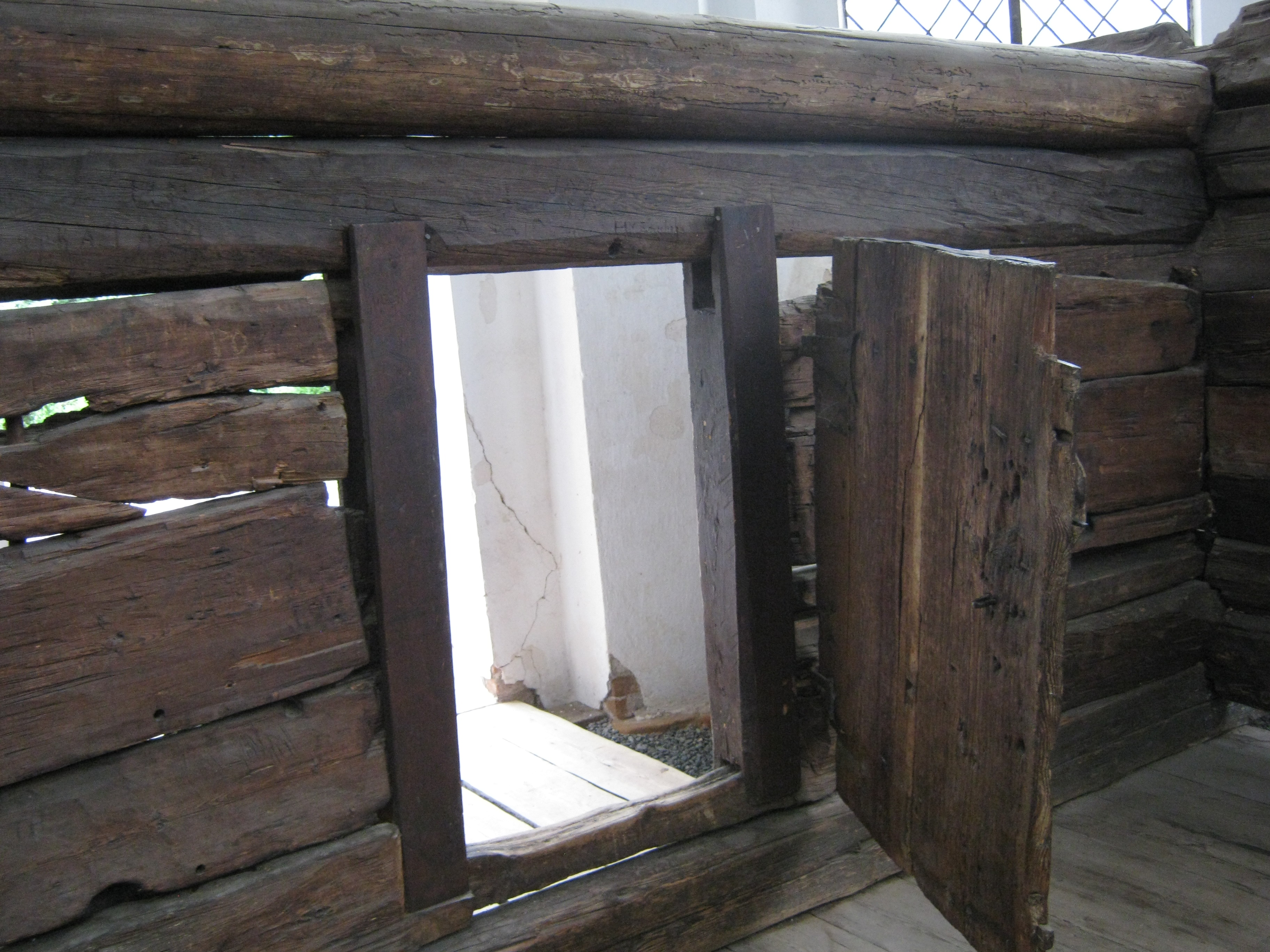
Inside the granary

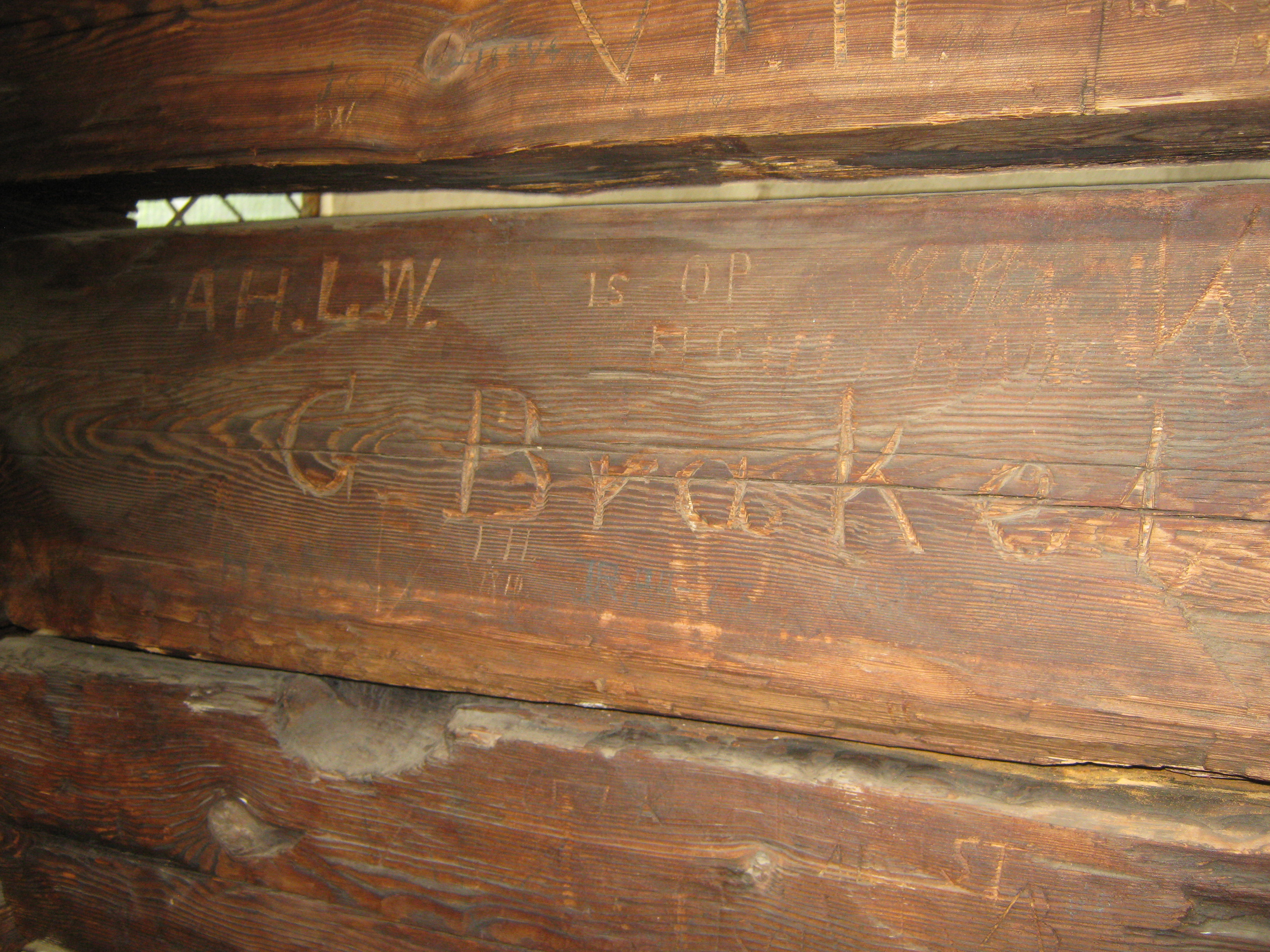
Old carvings

== Sources ==
- St. Henry's Chapel (in Finnish)
- Spotting History
