= Kirkkokari =

Island in Köyliö, Finland

Coordinates: 61.147199°N 22.325543°E

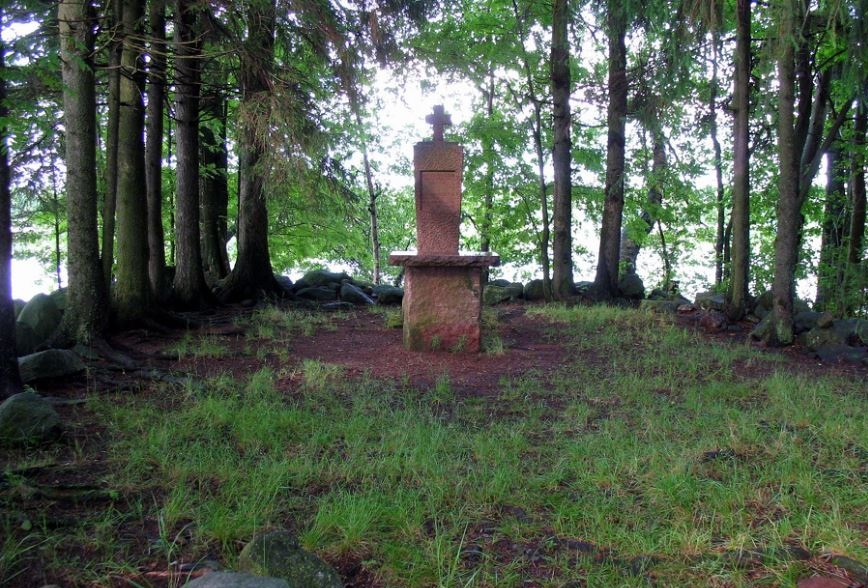
Memorial of Christianization of Finland

Kirkkokari (Swedish: Kyrkholmen; "the Church Islet", also known as Saint Henry's Island (Finnish: Pyhän Henrikin saari, Swedish: S:t Henriks holm)) is a small island in Lake Köyliö in Köyliö municipality, Satakunta, Finland. It is the only modern day Roman Catholic pilgrimage site in Finland and one of the few in Nordic countries.

According to tradition, Saint Henry was murdered by Lalli on the ice of Lake Köyliö by the Kirkkokari island in the winter of 1156. Since the 13th century, it was a pilgrimage site for Catholics. A small chapel was built on the island which was used until the 18th century. Foundations of the chapel are still visible. In 1955, the memorial of Christianization of Finland was erected in Kirkkokari and a small altar, "Saint Henry's altar", in 1999.

The Finnish Roman Catholic Church organizes an annual pilgrimage to Kirkkokari via the Saint Henry's Way. The 140-kilometre-long journey starts from the city of Turku. It ends on a memorial service in Kirkkokari on the last pre-Midsummer Sunday.
