= Teljä =

Historical settlement in Finland

Coordinates: 61.257657°N 22.370052°E

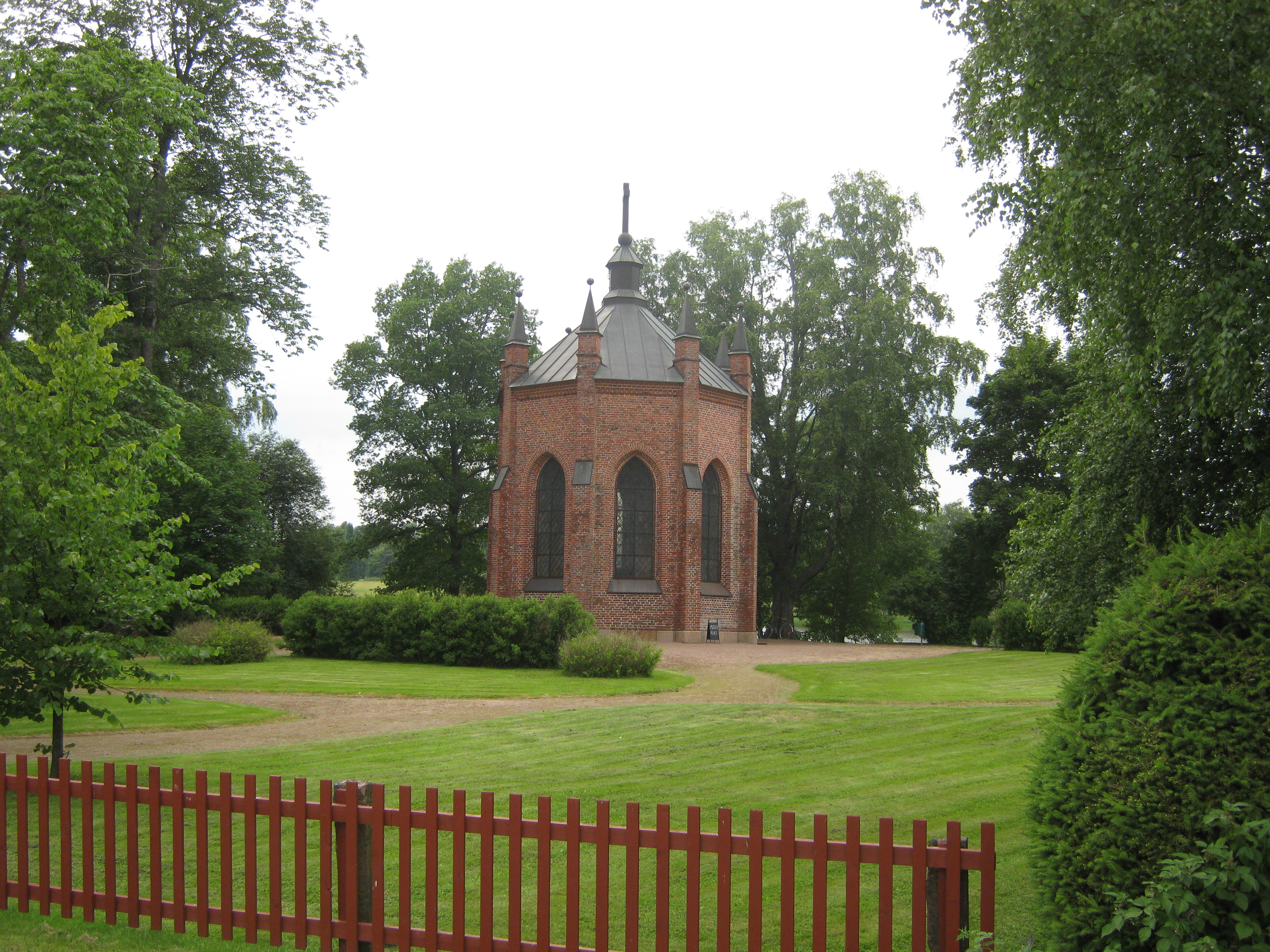
Surroundings of the St. Henry's Chapel, assumed location of Teljä.

Teljä (also Telja or Tälje) was a late Iron Age and early Middle Ages settlement in Finland at the historical province of Satakunta. According to tradition it was located by the river Kokemäenjoki in the present municipality of Kokemäki. It is uncertain whether Teljä was a town-like settlement or more of a market place for Baltic Sea traders.

== History ==
Teljä is considered to be the predecessor of Medieval Ulvila town and the 1558 founded city of Pori. The settlement and its harbor moved downstream as the river went shallow due to post-glacial rebound. Some tradition claims Teljä was preceded by an ancient settlement named Hahlo which was located few kilometers upstream.

There is no archaeological evidence of Teljä; in 1960 an excavation led by professor Unto Salo found no traces of an Iron Age town but the archaeologists discovered remains of Medieval village that was later destroyed by fire. Some Viking Age and Medieval objects were also found. According to Salo and an earlier historian Jalmari Jaakkola, Teljä was established in the 11th century by Swedish merchants. River Kokemäenjoki was the waterway connecting sea to the inland lakes of Upper Satakunta, which is a part of modern-day Pirkanmaa region. The most important export since Iron Age was fur.

== Location ==
Teljä's assumed location is at the site of 1857 built St. Henry's Chapel. It is a brick chapel which covers a small wooden granary used by Bishop Henry in 1150s as a sermon room. It is possible that St. Henry was preaching at Teljä on the First Swedish Crusade, although the expedition itself might be just a myth. The granary was later converted to a chapel that was a destination for pilgrimages until the Reformation era.

== Name ==
In documents the name Teljä was first mentioned in 1650 Swedish geography description Epitome descriptionis Svecia, Gothiae, Fenningiae et subjectarum provinciarum by professor Mikael Wexionius. The name is assumed to be same origin as the "Tälje"-named places in Sweden. Some 18th-century descriptions call Teljä as "Öster-Tälje" (East Tälje) to distinguish it from Swedish Norrtälje (North Tälje) and Södertälje (South Tälje).
