= Kokemäki =

Kokemäki Kumo
- Town
- Kokemäen kaupunki Kumo stad
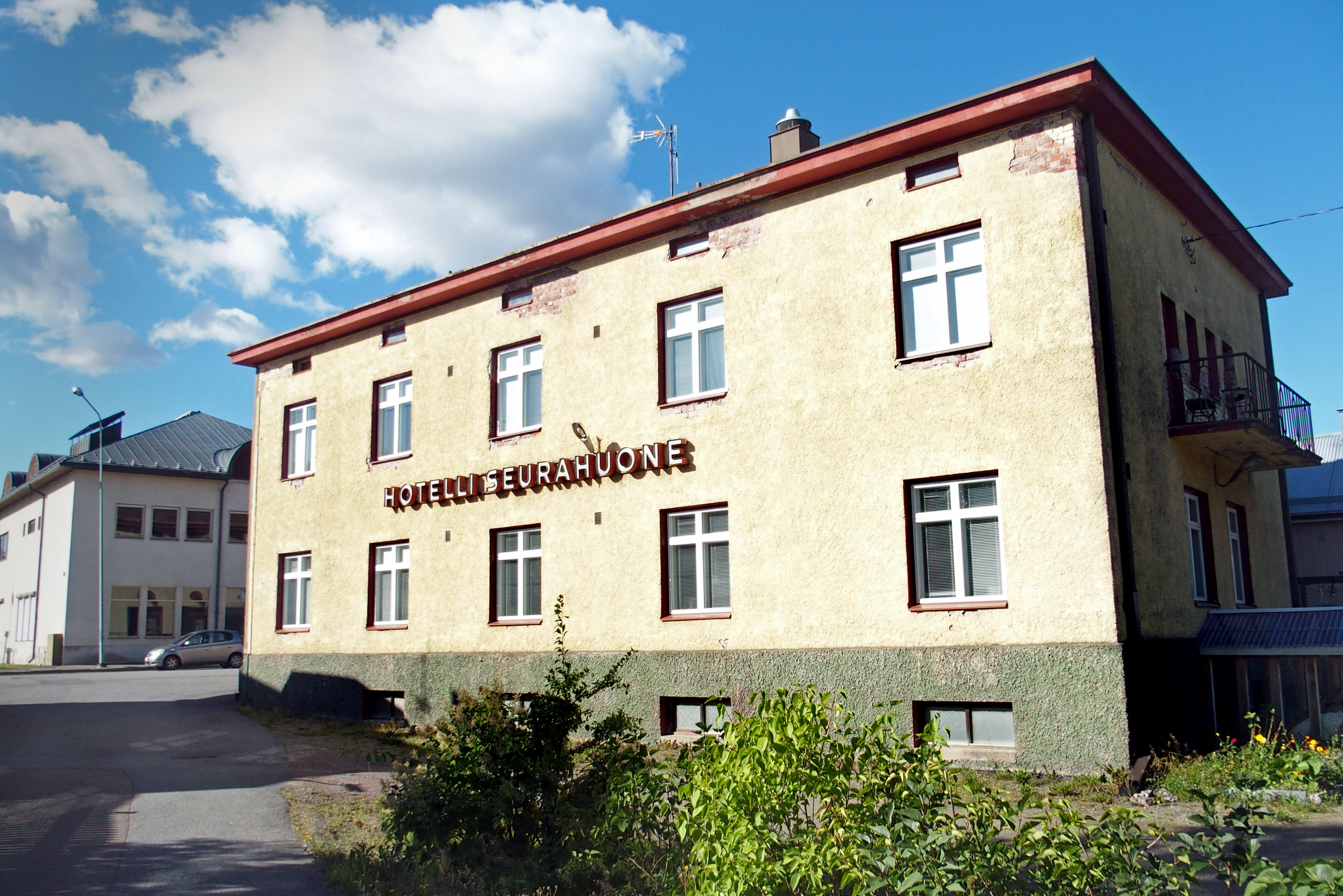
- An old hotel Seurahuone in Tulkkila, Kokemäki

- Coat of arms

- Location of Kokemäki in Finland
- Interactive map of Kokemäki
- Coordinates: 61°15.5′N 022°21′E
- Country: Finland
- Region: Satakunta
- Sub-region: Pori
- Parish: 1324
- Charter: 1869
- Town privileges: 1977

Government
  - Town manager: Teemu Nieminen

Area (2018-01-01)
  - Total: 531.27 km^{2} (205.12 sq mi)
  - Land: 480.42 km^{2} (185.49 sq mi)
  - Water: 50.04 km^{2} (19.32 sq mi)
  - Rank: 181st largest in Finland

Population (2025-12-31)
  - Total: 6,583
  - Rank: 137th largest in Finland
  - Density: 13.7/km^{2} (35/sq mi)

Population by native language
  - Finnish: 95.6% (official)
  - Swedish: 0.2%
  - Others: 4.2%

Population by age
  - 0 to 14: 12.8%
  - 15 to 64: 56.3%
  - 65 or older: 30.9%
- Time zone: UTC+02:00 (EET)
  - Summer (DST): UTC+03:00 (EEST)
- Climate: Dfc
- Website: en.kokemaki.fi

Kokemäki (Finnish: [ˈkokeˌmæki]; Swedish: Kumo) is a town and municipality in the Satakunta Region of Finland. The town has a population of 6,583 (31 December 2025) and covers an area of 531.27 square kilometres (205.12 sq mi) of which 50.04 km^{2} (19.32 sq mi) is water. The population density is 13.7 inhabitants per square kilometre (35/sq mi).

Finland is constitutionally bi-lingual with a Swedish speaking minority. The municipality is unilingual with the vast majority of the population speaking Finnish. Many, mostly younger, residents are able to understand or speak some English.

The American battery company Æsir Technologies Inc. has announced that it will establish a nickel hydroxide plant producing material for nickel-zinc batteries in the village of Peipohja of Kokemäki.

The Kokemäki coat of arms depicts the bishop's mitre.

== Geography ==
The 121 kilometres (75 mi) long Kokemäki River (Kokemäenjoki) flows from Lake Liekovesi, in the Pirkanmaa region, through Kokemäki and in to the Gulf of Bothnia at Pori. The Kolsi hydro-electric power plant is located at Kokemäki. Kokemäki River has long been an important waterway, well known for its salmon, whitefish and lamprey.

=== Climate ===
Climate data for Kokemäki Tulkkila (1991-2020 normals, extremes 1959-present from Rausenkulma & Tulkkila)
Month	Jan	Feb	Mar	Apr	May	Jun	Jul	Aug	Sep	Oct	Nov	Dec	Year
Record high °C (°F)	9.5 (49.1)	9.5 (49.1)	15.1 (59.2)	23.3 (73.9)	29.6 (85.3)	32.6 (90.7)	33.0 (91.4)	31.9 (89.4)	27.7 (81.9)	18.5 (65.3)	13.8 (56.8)	11.3 (52.3)	33.0 (91.4)
Mean daily maximum °C (°F)	−1.8 (28.8)	−1.9 (28.6)	2.3 (36.1)	8.9 (48.0)	15.5 (59.9)	19.6 (67.3)	22.3 (72.1)	21.0 (69.8)	15.4 (59.7)	8.2 (46.8)	2.9 (37.2)	0.1 (32.2)	9.4 (48.9)
Daily mean °C (°F)	−4.5 (23.9)	−5.1 (22.8)	−1.6 (29.1)	4.1 (39.4)	10.1 (50.2)	14.5 (58.1)	17.2 (63.0)	15.8 (60.4)	10.8 (51.4)	5.2 (41.4)	1.0 (33.8)	−2.2 (28.0)	5.4 (41.7)
Mean daily minimum °C (°F)	−7.7 (18.1)	−8.7 (16.3)	−5.6 (21.9)	−0.3 (31.5)	4.2 (39.6)	8.9 (48.0)	11.7 (53.1)	10.6 (51.1)	6.6 (43.9)	2.3 (36.1)	−1.3 (29.7)	−4.9 (23.2)	1.3 (34.3)
Record low °C (°F)	−37.5 (−35.5)	−39.7 (−39.5)	−31.5 (−24.7)	−20.6 (−5.1)	−5.7 (21.7)	−2.4 (27.7)	0.0 (32.0)	−0.9 (30.4)	−7.6 (18.3)	−16.9 (1.6)	−24.1 (−11.4)	−35.5 (−31.9)	−39.7 (−39.5)
Average precipitation mm (inches)	44 (1.7)	33 (1.3)	29 (1.1)	29 (1.1)	36 (1.4)	61 (2.4)	61 (2.4)	69 (2.7)	57 (2.2)	65 (2.6)	53 (2.1)	52 (2.0)	589 (23.2)
Average precipitation days	17	13	11	10	10	11	12	13	12	14	16	18	157
Source 1: https://helda.helsinki.fi/handle/10138/336063
Source 2: https://kilotavu.com/fmi-tilastot.php?taulukkomoodi=true

== History ==
It is believed that the Iron Age town of Teljä was located next to the Kokemäenjoki river at Kokemäki. The oldest stone carving yet found in Finland, dated at 8,000 to 9,000 years old, was discovered in nearby Huittinen in 1903. The 10 cm elk's head is in a permanent exhibition at the National Museum of Finland in the capital, Helsinki. Archeological finds from in and around Kokemäki have been dated to the Middle Ages.

Kokemäki is thought to have been founded in the 12th century, maybe even earlier. The Kokemäki parish was established in 1324. While part of the Kingdom of Sweden, the administrative area (slottslän) of Kumogård (Kokemäenkartano) was created in 1331. Kokemäki served as the administrative centre of the historical province of Satakunta until 1634. The Medieval Kokemäki Castle was demolished in 1367.

The medieval trading route of Huovintie goes from Turku, by Kokemäki and the river of Kokemäenjoki. Along the Huovintie were guild houses where travellers could stay overnight. This was located near the Kokemäki church.

The legend states that in 1156 Bishop Henry of Uppsala visited Satakunta on a preaching tour as a part of Eric IX of Sweden's first crusade to Finland. St. Henry's Chapel is a neogothic style brick chapel one kilometre east of the town centre of Kokemäki. The chapel was built in 1857 on the site of a medieval wooden granary which was used by Bishop Henry. It is possible that the original building dates back to between the 12th and 15th century, making it the oldest remaining wooden building in Finland.

Kokemäki was granted a town charter in 1869.

During the Revolution of 1918 some one-hundred-fifty-three individuals were killed in the municipality of Kokemäki.

The municipality of Kauvatsa was merged with Kokemäki in 1969. Kokemäki was granted city status in 1977.

== Transport ==
The transport system of Finland is well-developed with an extensive road system.

=== Road ===
Highway 2 passes to the south, running from Helsinki to Pori on the Baltic coast; Highway 11 runs from Pori to Nokia only briefly in the northern part of the municipality; and Highway 12 runs from Rauma to Tampere and Nokia, passing through nearby Huittinen.

Helsinki is 205 kilometres (127 mi) or two and a half hours away by car.

There are two electric vehicle (EV) charging points in Kokemäki, with another 55 within a 160 kilometres (99 mi) radius.

The private coach companies OnniBus and ExpressBus operate services to all major towns and regions in Finland.

=== Rail ===
Finnish trains have a reputation for being spacious, comfortable and clean.

The state-owned rail company VR operates a service between Tampere and Pori, stopping at Kokemäki.

The train station is 3 kilometres (1.9 mi) to the west of the town centre at Peipohja.

=== Air ===
The nearest airport is Pori Airport, which is 43 kilometres (27 mi) or 40 minutes away by Highway 2. Piikajärvi Airfield is located ca. 8 kilometres south west of Kokemäki.

Tampere-Pirkkala Airport is 96 kilometres (60 mi) or an hour and ten minutes away by Highway 12.

Helsinki-Vantaa Airport is two hours and twenty minutes away by Highway 2.

== Tourist attractions ==
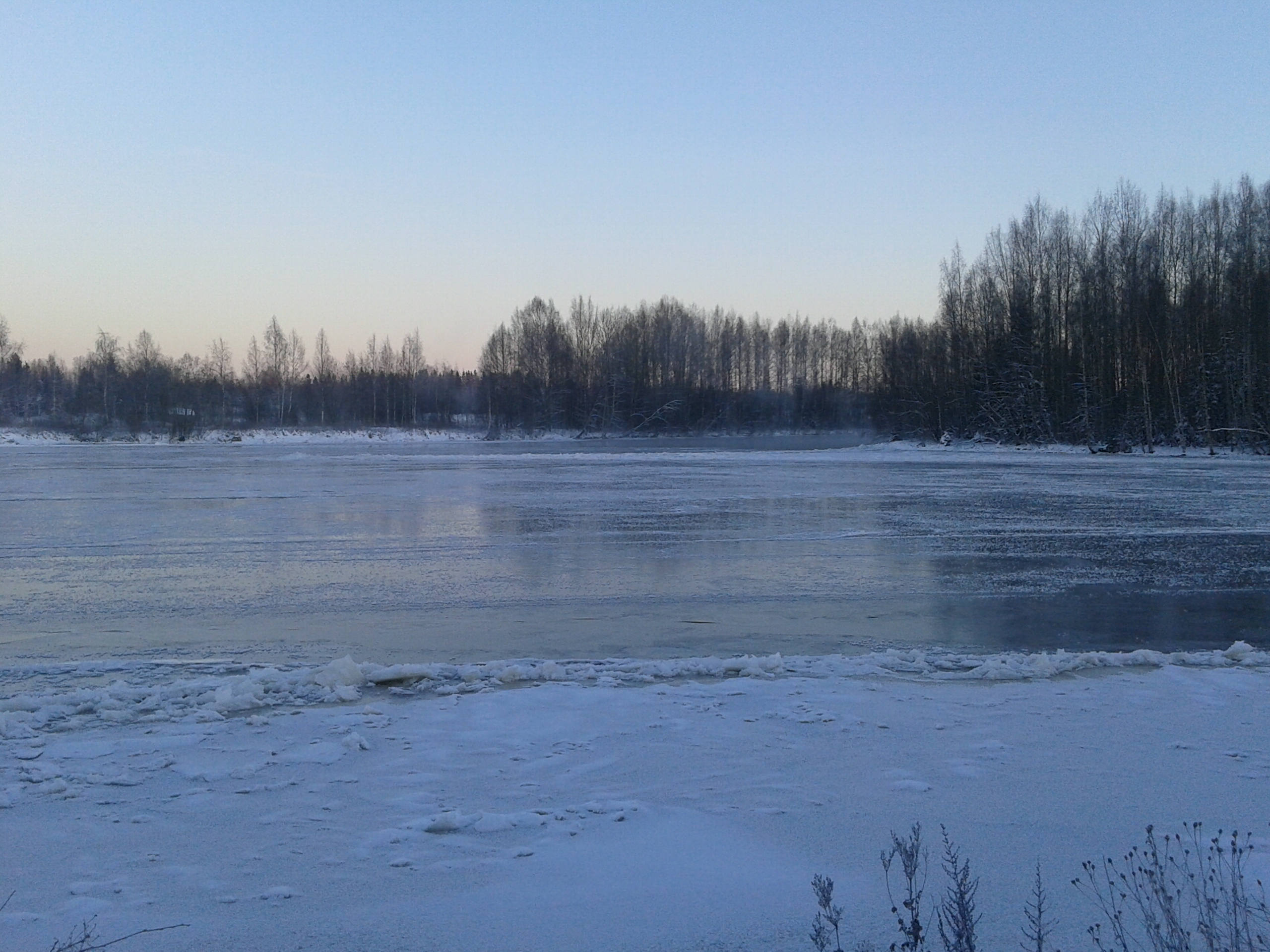
Kokemäenjoki river

- St. Henry's Chapel
- Tulkkila - Museum Bridge
- Vestry of Saint Maria's Church
- Puurijärvi-Isosuo National Park
- Museum of Agriculture or "Maatalousmuseo"
- Open-air Museum
- Kokemäenjoki river
- Kriivari Reindeer Farm
- Sapila Suspension Bridge
- Church of Gustav lll

== Education ==
The Finnish education system is based on comprehensive schooling and is publicly funded.

Kokemäki has six schools offering primary and secondary education. These are; Tuomaala, Tulkkila, Riste, Peipohja, Lahteenmaki and Korkeaoja High School. There is free pre-school education for all children aged 6. The Peipohjan day-care nursery caters for children aged 9 months to 5 years.

There is a special needs Forsby School for children aged 0–9.

Vocational training is provided by Satakunta Training Consortium, known as SATAEDU and Huittinen Business and Vocational College.

== International relations ==
=== Twin towns – sister cities ===
Kokemäki is twinned with:

- Falköping, Sweden
- Lier, Norway
- Mariagerfjord, Denmark
- Põltsamaa, Estonia
