= Kauvatsa =

Former municipality in Finland, part of Kokemäki

Coordinates: 61°18′34.89″N 22°32′21.83″E

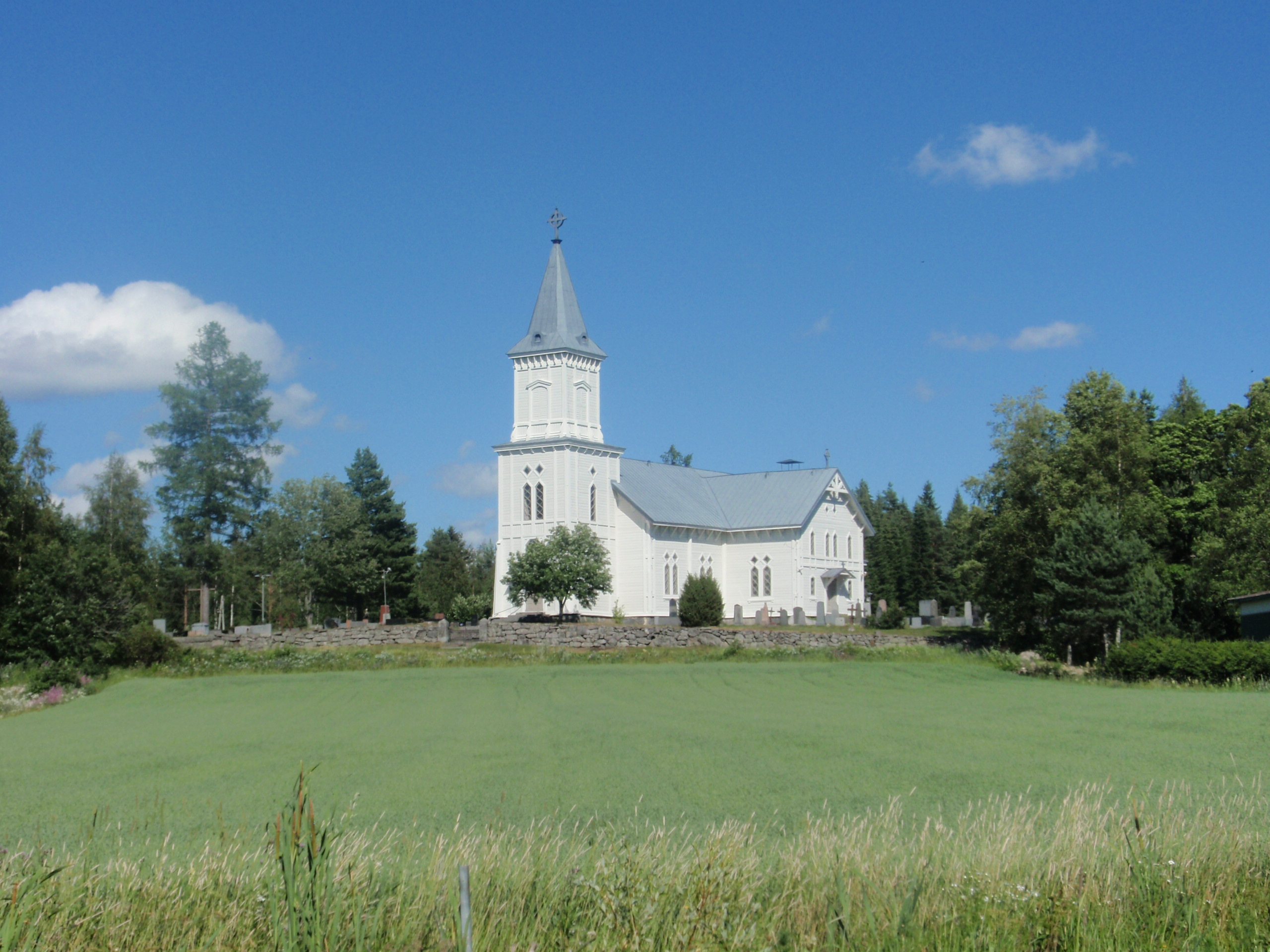
Kauvatsa Church (1879), designed by C. J. von Heideken

Kauvatsa is a former municipality in the Satakunta province, Finland. It was annexed with the municipality of Kokemäki in 1969. The population of Kauvatsa was 2,133 in 1968.
