= Hiirijärvi =

Village in Harjavalta, Finland

Coordinates: 61.274966°N 22.065580°E

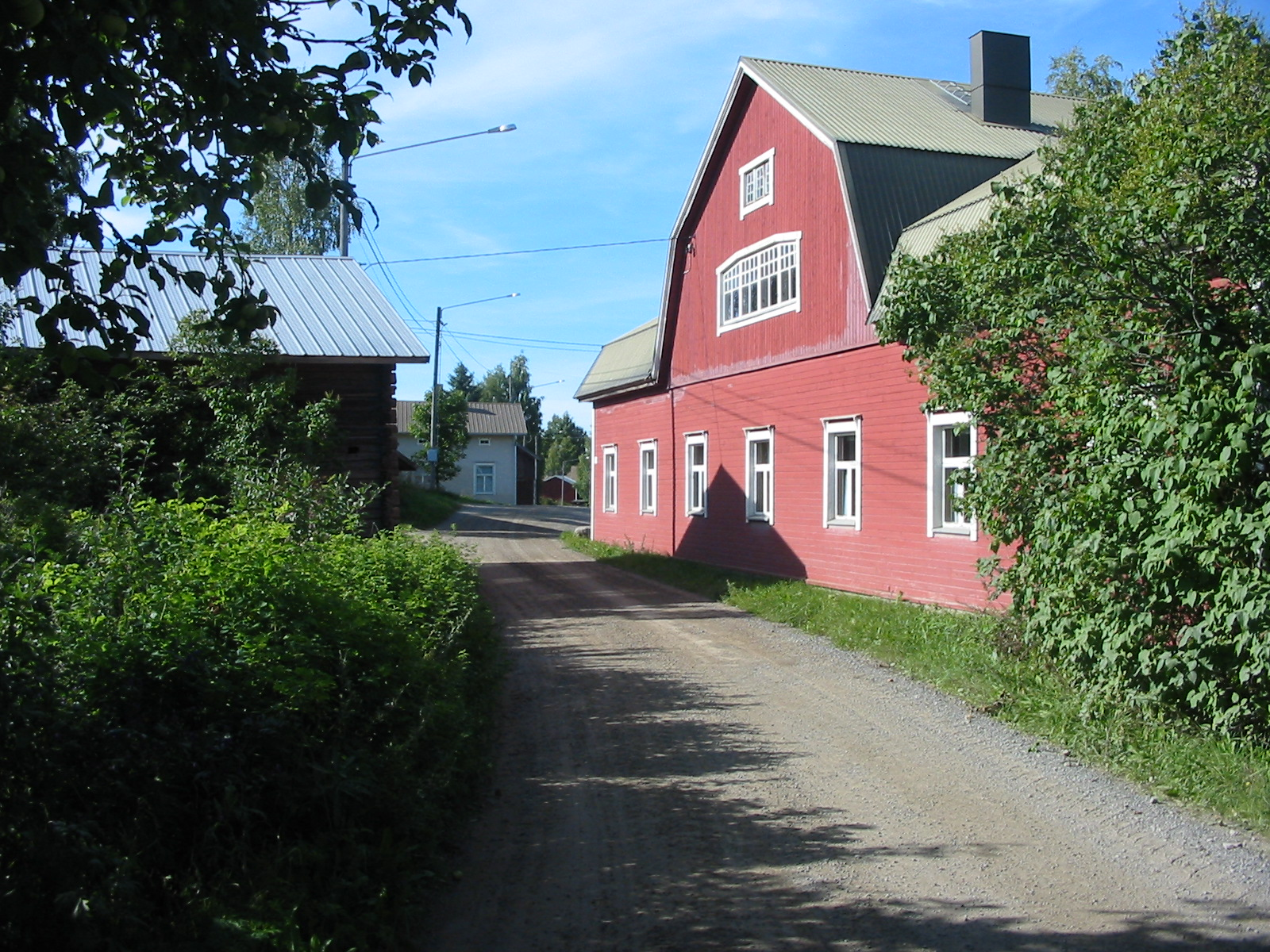
Farm houses in Hiirijärvi

Hiirijärvi (Finnish pronunciation: [ˈhiːriˌjærʋi]) is a village in the Harjavalta municipality, Satakunta region, Finland. The small lake with a same name was drained for farming in the 1950s. Population of Hiirijärvi is approximately 400.

Hiirijärvi has a rich prehistory with artifacts dating to the Kiukainen culture 2300–1500 BC and a large number of Bronze Age cairns. Hiirijärvi is best known of the Medieval legend of Bishop Henry. In 1156, according to the tradition, after murdering Henry the farmer Lalli fled to the woods where he was chased to a tree by a flock of mice. Lalli fell from the tree to a lake and drowned. The Lake Hiirijärvi ("Mouse Lake") allegedly received its name from the myth. One of the sights in Hiirijärvi is the "Lalli's cry stone", a boulder which is said to be eternally damp with Lalli's tears. However, the phenomenon is based on capillary action.
