= Piikajärvi Airfield =

Piikajärvi Airfield Piikajärven lentokenttä
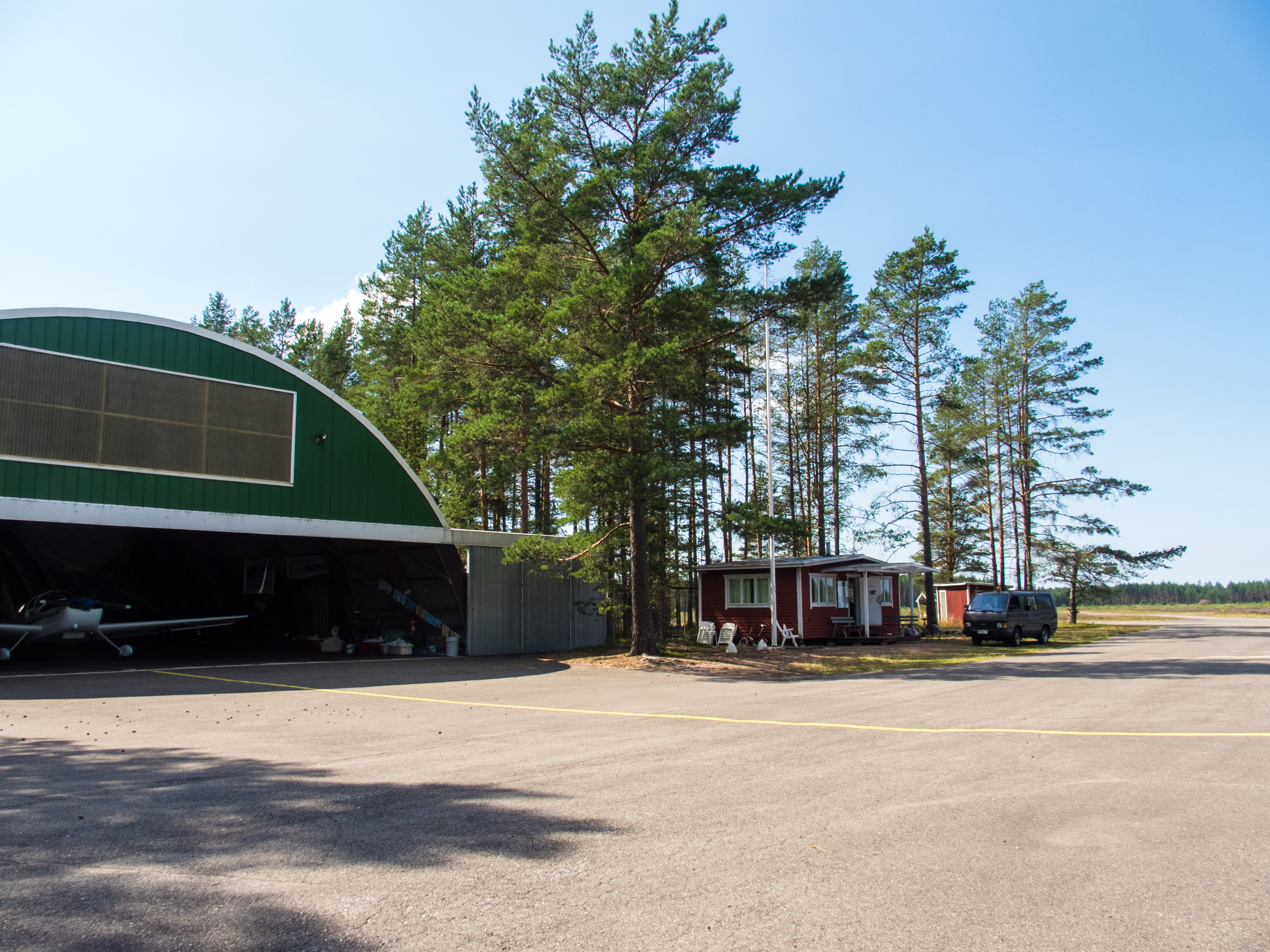
- IATA: none; ICAO: EFPI

Summary
- Operator: Piikajärven ilmailuyhdistys
- Location: Kokemäki, Finland
- Elevation AMSL: 148 ft / 45 m
- Coordinates: 61°14′43″N 022°11′42″E
- Website: https://www.efpi.fi/

Map
- Location within Finland

Runways
Direction	Length		Surface
Direction	m	ft	Surface
12/30	1,000	3,281	asphalt, gravel
17/35	1,080	3,543	asphalt, gravel

Piikajärvi Airfield (ICAO: EFPI) is an airfield in Kokemäki, Finland, located by the Lake Piikajärvi ca. 8 kilometres (5.0 mi) south west of the town. It is operated by Piikajärven ilmailuyhdistys (Piikajärvi Aviation Society). Piikaärvi Airfield was opened in 1943 as an alternate landing site for the Finnish Air Force. Today it is mostly used by gliders.
