= Kirkkosaari =

Island in Pielavesi, Finland

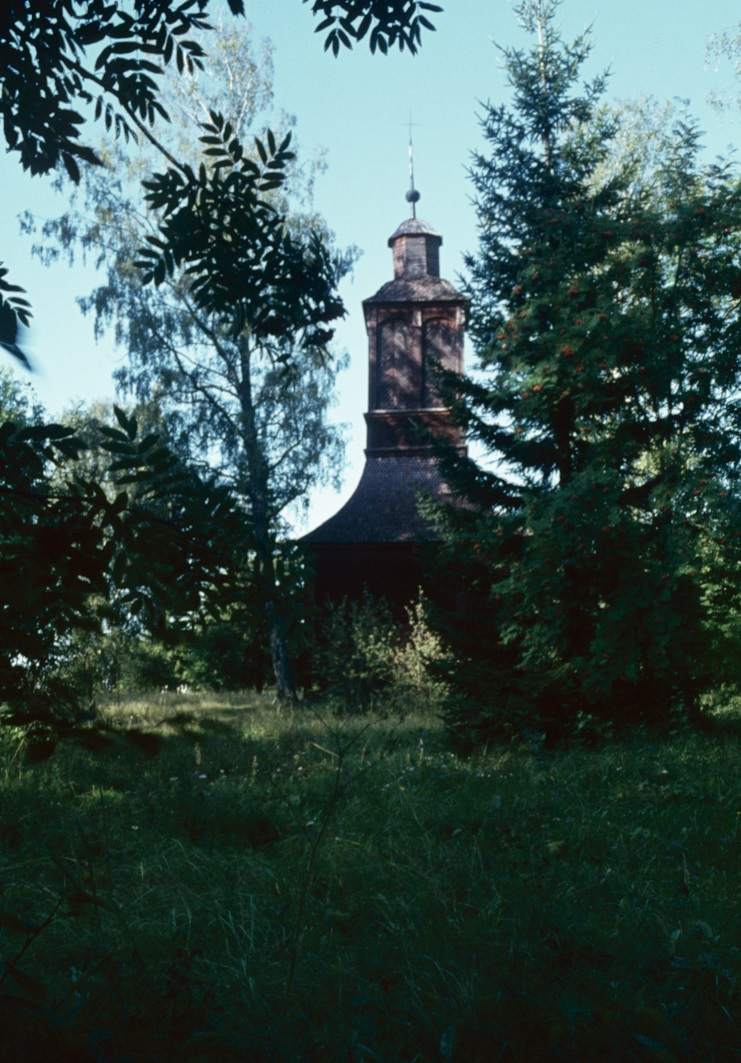
- The old bell tower in Kirkkosaari
- Interactive map of Kirkkosaari

Geography
- Location: Pielavesi, North Savo, Finland
- Coordinates: 63°15′50″N 26°40′27″E
- Area: 7.6 km^{2} (2.9 sq mi)
- Highest point: Kirkkovuori, 144 m

Kirkkosaari (Church Island) is an island in Finland. It is surrounded by lake Pielavesi and is part of the municipality of Pielavesi. It was the former parish center, and was originally called Lammassalo.

There is a bridge connecting Kirkkosaari to the mainland via the northern Tenhusaari. In the southern part of the island, Kirkkoniemi stands out as it is where the 144-meters-high hill Kirkkovuori is located. There is also a road connecting the island to Pangansalo.

== The Church Island ==
In 1683, the people of Pielavesi received permission from the Bishop of Viipuri, Petrus Bång, to build a church. The site chosen was Kirkkosaari, because it is located near good water connections. It was completed in 1961. The church is associated with the Finnish saying "ahtaat paikat kuin Pielaveden kirkossa" (cramped places like in Pielavesi Church). Nowadays, the old churchyard has a bell tower and a monument for those who died during the famine of the 1860s. A slender, Ostrobothnian-style Renaissance statue was built in 1748 under the direction of Anders Brofall.

There were three churches on the island until it was moved to Hiekkaniemi, Pielavesi, in the 1850s.
