= Lalli =

12th-century apocryphal Finnish person

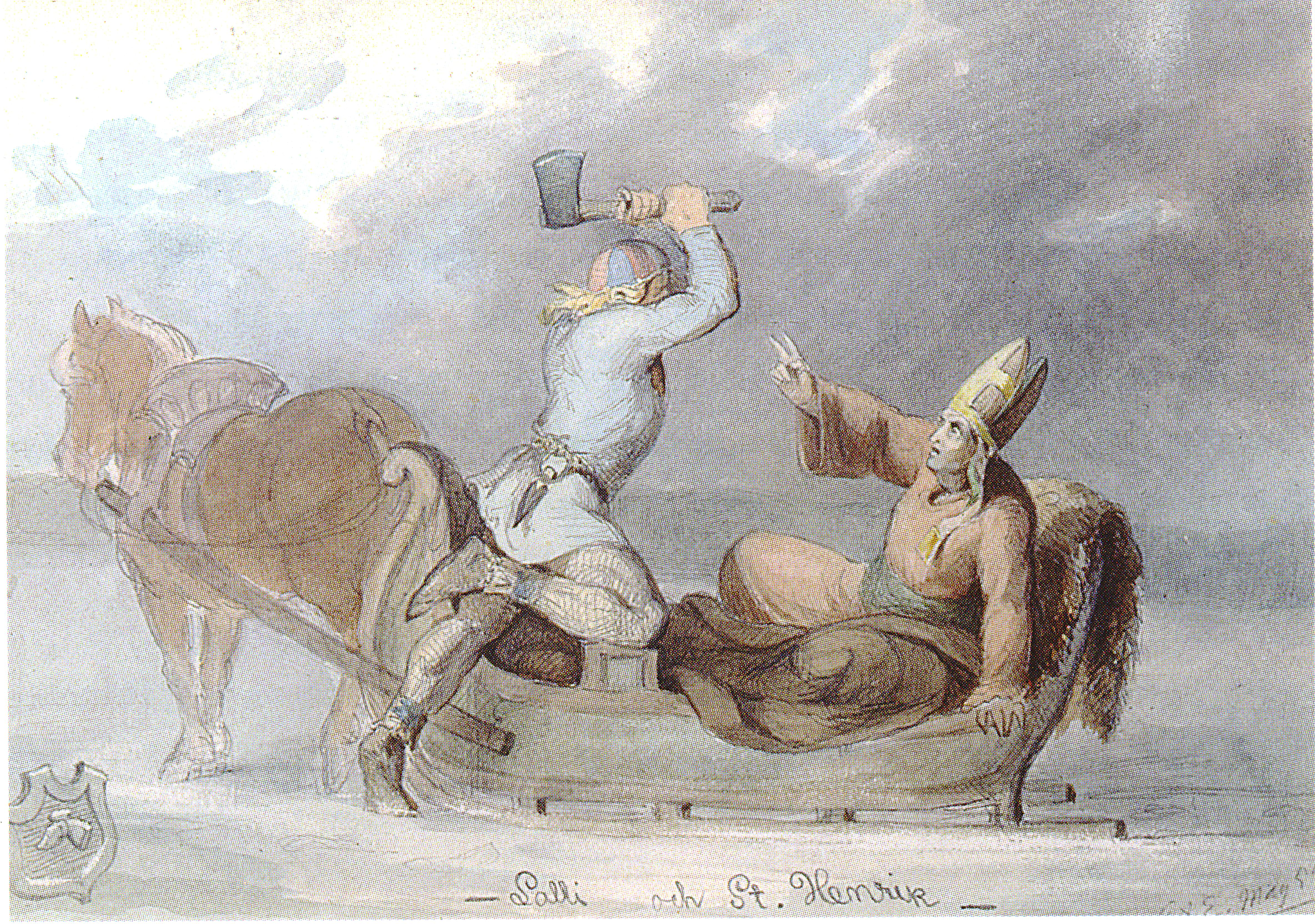
- The murder of St. Henry by Lalli, painting by C. A. Ekman (1854)
- Died: c. 1160; Köyliönjärvi, Finland
- Known for: Killing Bishop Henry
- Spouse: Kerttu

Lalli (Finnish: [ˈlɑlːi]) is an apocryphal character from Finnish history and one of the most well-known figures in Finnish medieval legend. According to tradition, he was a prosperous yeoman farmer who killed Bishop Henry, who was spreading Christianity to then pagan Finland, on the ice of lake Köyliö on 20 January in the late 1150s.

In medieval church art, Lalli became a central attribute in the iconography of Saint Henry, typically depicted being trampled underfoot by the bishop as a symbol of his sanctity. In the 19th and early 20th centuries, a fennomanist reinterpretation cast him as a symbol of Finnish resistance against Swedish dominance, and in some circles even as a folk hero.

== Sources ==
The principal source for the story of Lalli is a Finnish folk poem known as Henrikin surma ("The Slaying of Henry"), which likely dates to the 13th century. The poem describes the killing of Bishop Henry in considerable detail, but contains few historically verifiable facts. The account of Lalli's subsequent fate appears to have been added in later folk tradition. Church legends about Saint Henry do not mention Lalli by name, but a separate medieval document contains the expression "Lallis bolstadh" ("Lalli's dwelling place"), suggesting a possible historical connection.

== Legend ==
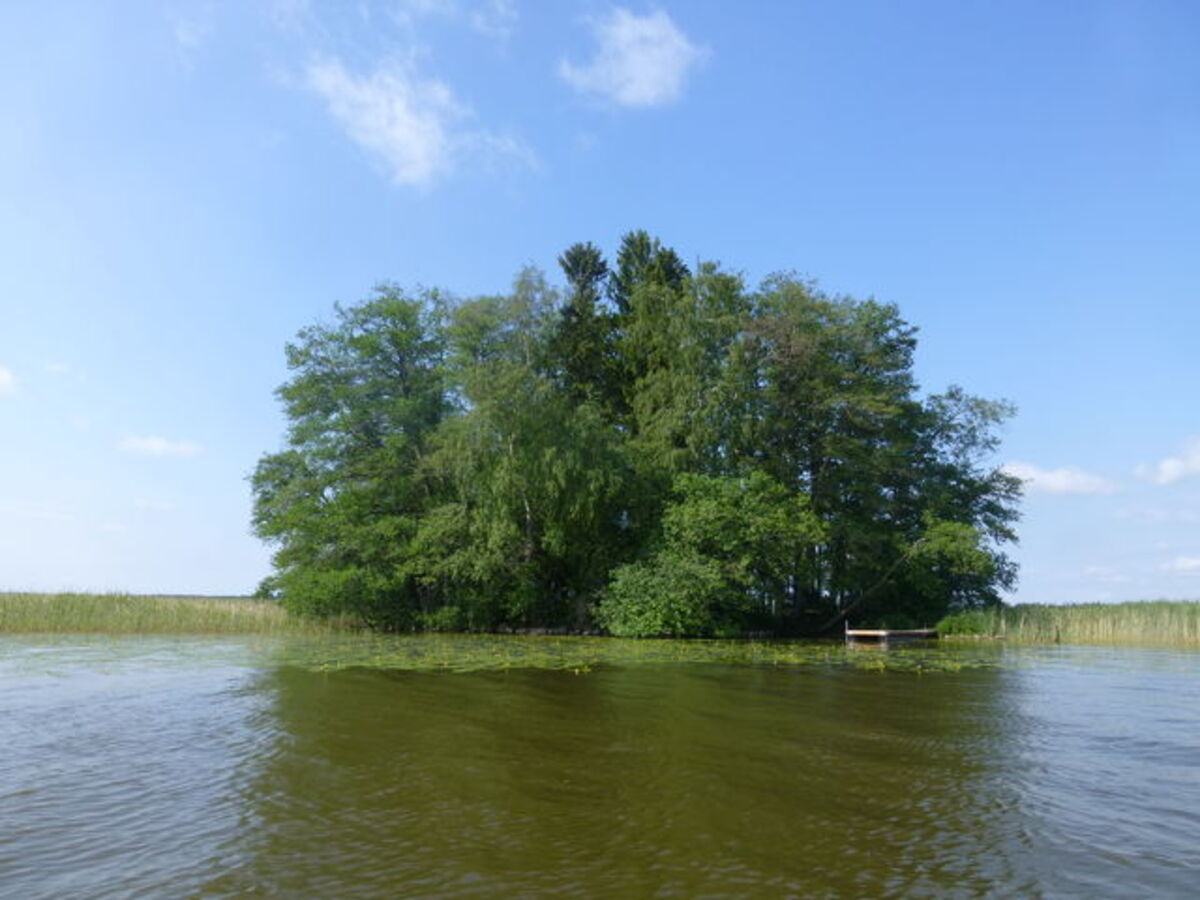
Kirkkokari (lit. 'Church Islet') on lake, where, according to legend, the murder took place.

The story begins with an expedition of one of the first Christian missionaries in Finland, Bishop Henry, during the alleged first crusade of Sweden. In the midst of travelling, he and his entourage stop at a dwelling. Only the matron of the house, Kerttu, is home. Bishop Henry asks for food for his party and hay for the horses, but the matron refuses him. In their hunger, Bishop Henry and his men then forcibly take the food and hay but leave payment before continuing on with their journey. After they are gone, Lalli, the husband of Kerttu, returns and hears of what has happened. In most versions of the story, Kerttu leaves out the part of the payment entirely. The folk poem portrays Kerttu in an unsparing light as a deceitful and malicious wife whose lies drive Lalli to the deed. When Lalli hears of the bishop ransacking his home, he becomes enraged and pursues the bishop.

Lalli catches up to the bishop on the frozen lake Köyliönjärvi. Although the poem describes the bishop as travelling with only a single coachman, it seems unlikely that Henry would have journeyed with so small an escort – according to BLF, Lalli and his men in all probability attacked the bishop and his party. At Bishop Henry's bidding his entourage flees to a nearby forest. The bishop tries to calm the angered man, but Lalli strikes and kills Henry with an axe.

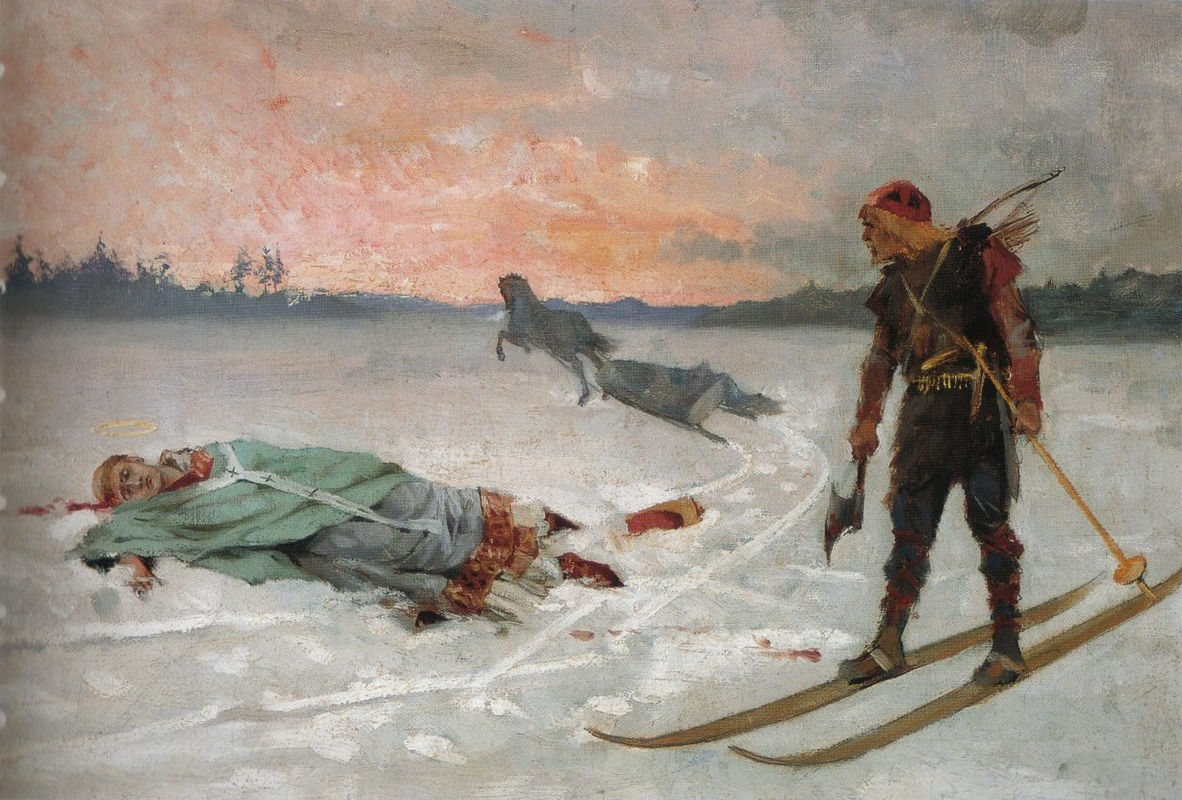
Bishop Henry killed by Lalli, painting by Albert Edelfelt (1877)

There are numerous versions as to how Lalli then meets his own gruesome fate. Typically Lalli takes the bishop's mitre to wear it pompously and cuts off the bishop's finger to snatch his valuable ring. The mitre becomes fused to Lalli's head and when he tries to remove it, it tears his scalp off with it. The folk tradition also emphasises Lalli's greed: according to an account recorded by Christfrid Ganander in the 18th century, the severed finger was dropped on the ice and found the following spring by a blind man, whose sight was restored when he touched it. For this reason, the severed finger bearing the ring features in the heraldic symbolism of the Archdiocese of Turku. Lalli runs to the woods, where mice or rats corner him up a tree. Lalli then falls from the tree into the lake Hiirijärvi and drowns. The story bears a notable resemblance to the continental legend of the Mäuseturm, in which a bishop who is punished for his greed meets a similarly supernatural end – a parallel that makes it difficult to assess the historical reliability of the Finnish account.

The legend is enshrined in the Finnish folk poem Henrikin surma ("The Slaying of Henry"), which includes such characters as a talking statue of Christ. One of the versions of the poem is found in the Kanteletar, a collection of old Finnish folk poetry.

== Cultural significance ==
Lalli is a well-known figure in Finnish folklore. In medieval church art he was depicted prostrated at the feet of Bishop Henry in wooden statues, and during the early 15th century, under Bishop Magnus Olai Tavast, the motif of Henry trampling Lalli became firmly established, making Lalli the central attribute in the saint's iconography.

Lalli used to be generally viewed as an evil-doer along with his wife, but in the 19th century and especially in the early 20th century he also became viewed as a sort of rebel pagan against imperialism and forced conversion during the Northern Crusades, a reinterpretation driven by fennomanist ideology.

In the television series Suuret suomalaiset – the Finnish version of 100 Greatest Britons – Lalli was chosen as the 14th greatest Finn.

The name Lalli is not common in Finland; it may be a form of "Laurentius", and is also said to be a name for the bear (traditionally saying the actual name of the animal was avoided, so the use of nicknames arose). Also, in Finnish toponymy Lalli occurs, for example, in Pirkkala, where there is both the place name Lalli and Lallin lahti ("Lalli Bay") on the shores of Lake Pyhäjärvi.

== Memorials and local traditions ==
Lalli's axe, along with Bishop Henrik's mitre feature in the coat of arms of the former municipality of Köyliö and now from 2015 the merged Säkylä. There is a statue of Lalli in Köyliö designed by Aimo Tukiainen, as well as two prominent relics in Satakunta: Lalli's hut and Lalli's tombstone. Both are, according to legend, places where Lalli took refuge after killing the bishop. Lalli's hut is located in Lootinnummi in Köyliö. There has been no actual archeological evidence that the mound of stone was once a house, but folklore claims that it was. 13 km away from Lalli's alleged hut is Lalli's tombstone: a boulder by Lake Hiirijärvi said to be still damp with Lalli's tears. This area has been called Lalli's farm. Lake Hiirijärvi ("Lake Mouse") allegedly received its name from the Lalli myth. Martti Haavio, a researcher of Finnish mythology, theorised that this was not part of the original story, but added later on. It is possible that the legends marking these areas as Lalli's settlements were manufactured by the church, as it would grant them rights to the land.

Köyliö Coat of Arms, featuring elements from the Lalli legend.

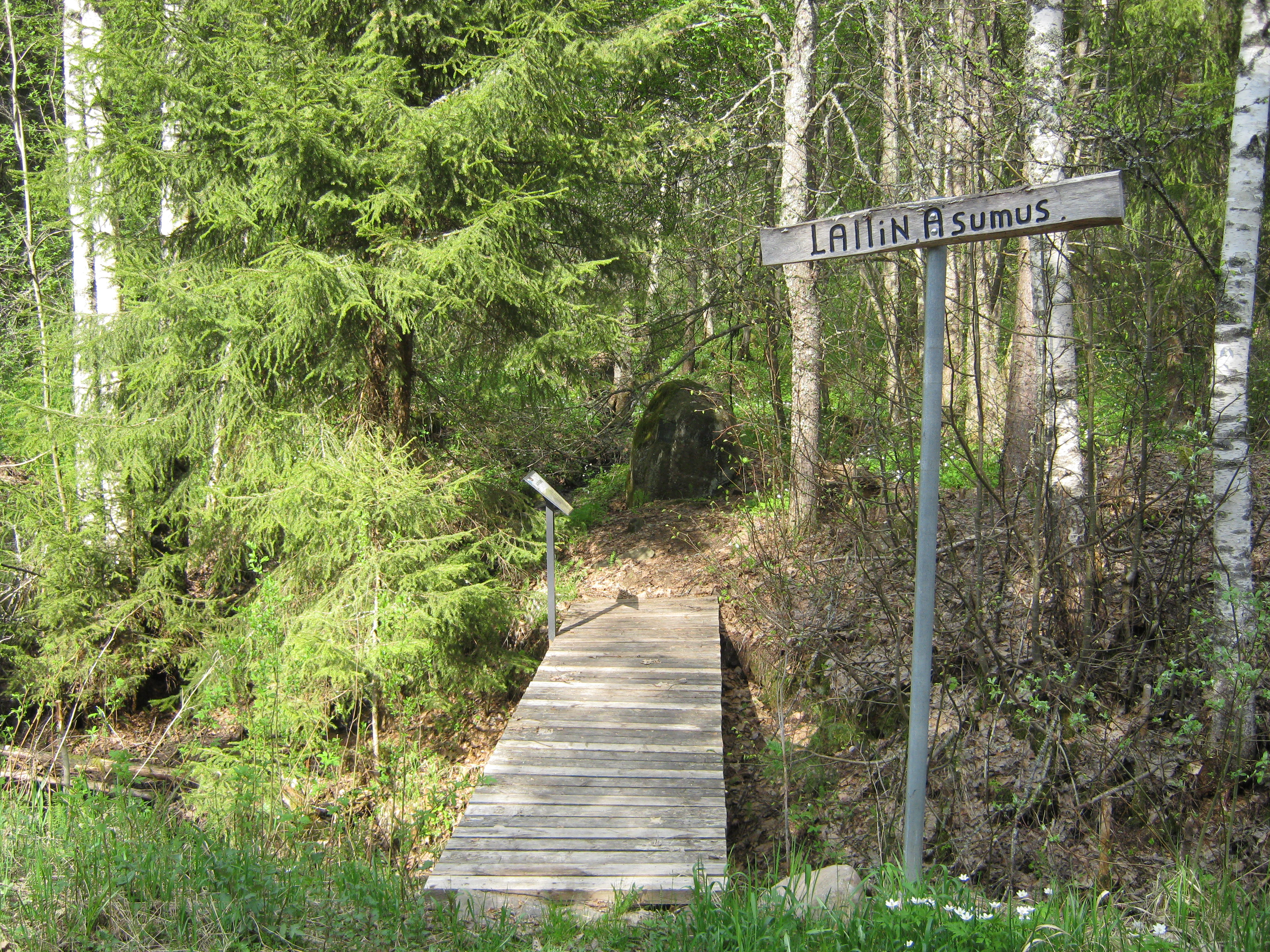
Storied "Lalli's residence" at Lootinnummi

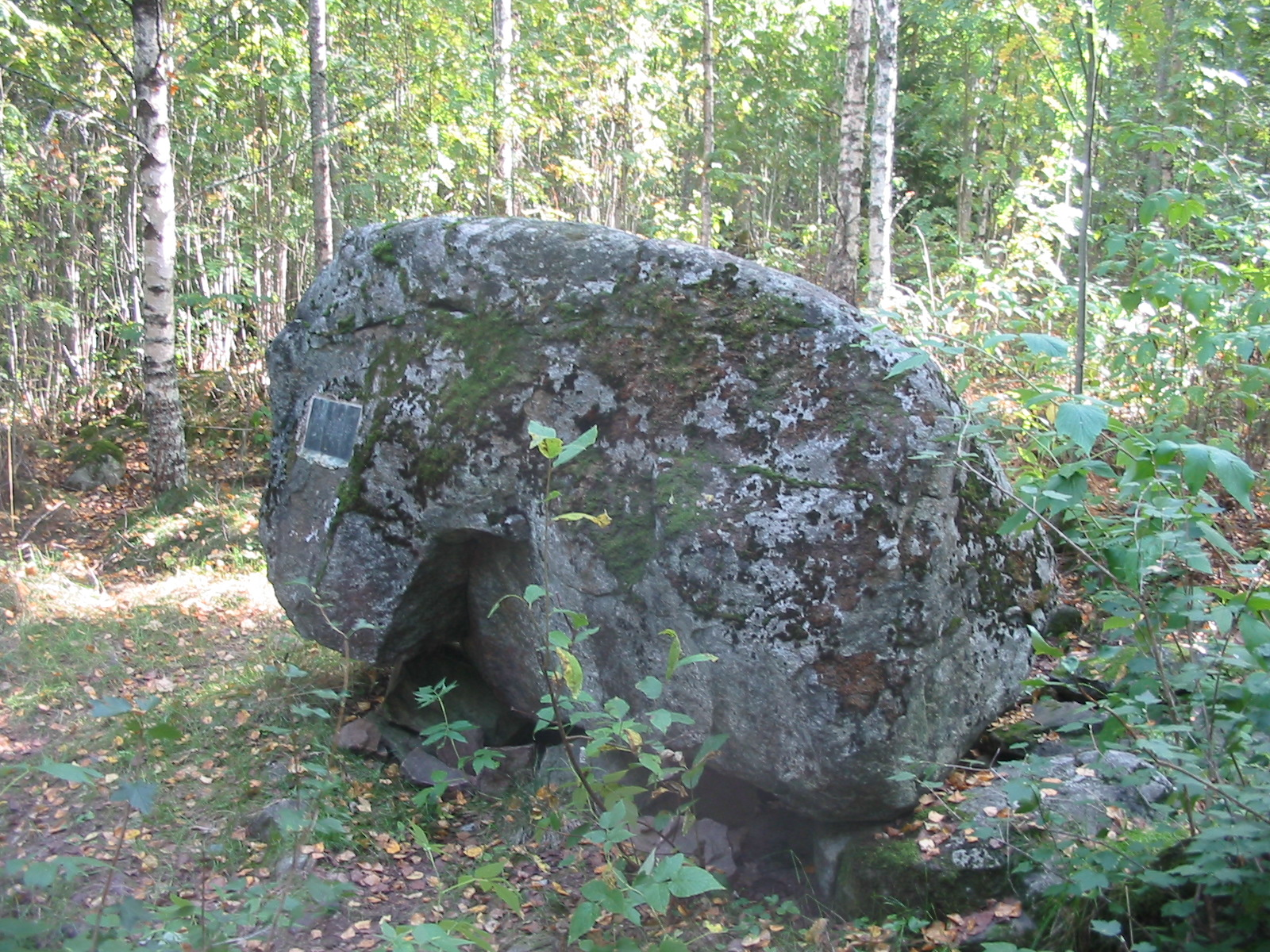
Similar Lalli's "crystone" in Hiirijärvi, which is still said to be moist from his tears

=== In modern popular culture ===
The story of Lalli and Henry's death on the lake is the subject of the song Köyliönjärven jäällä, by Finnish metal band Moonsorrow.

== Historicity ==
Although often considered a fictional story as there are no records of a Bishop Henry (as pointed out in research by historian Tuomas Heikkilä), new research by linguist Mikko Heikkilä claims that Bishop Henry was in fact a German missionary named Heinrich. He claims to have found records that state a missionary by the name of Heinrich (or "Heinärikki" as called by Finns) was slain in the early 12th century, only a few decades before the Bishop Henry of legend. According to him the fictional character of Bishop Henry was mostly based on Heinrich but was then conflated with the legend of Eric IX of Sweden, who is also storied to have met his end gruesomely murdered. Tuomas Heikkilä doubts this version of the events and states that Mikko Heikkilä combines different sources liberally.

== Gallery ==
Nousiainen Coat of Arms, with Henry stepping on Lalli

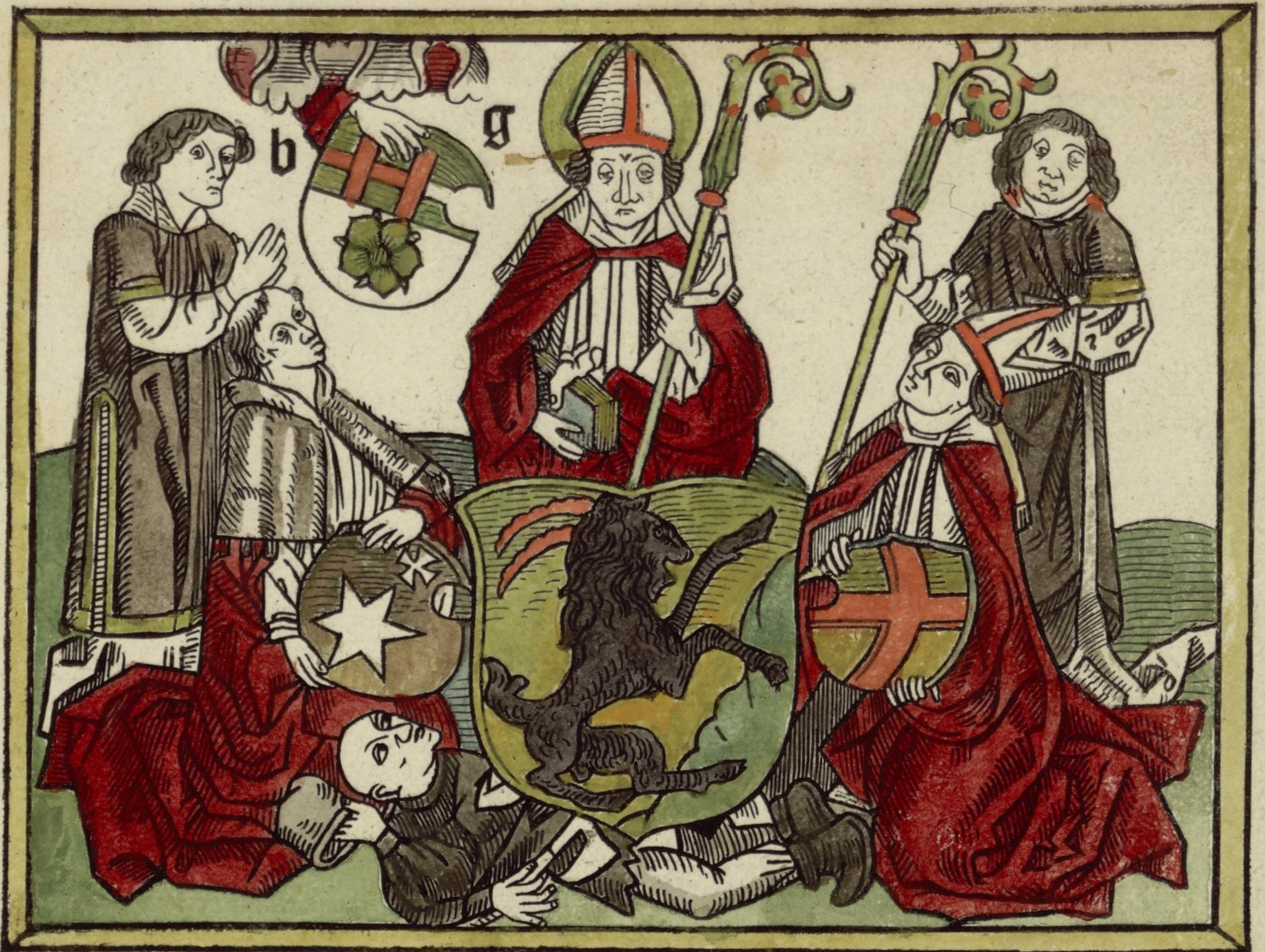
Bishop Henry with Konrad Blitz and Maunu Särkilahti on top of Lalli, Missale Aboense (1488)

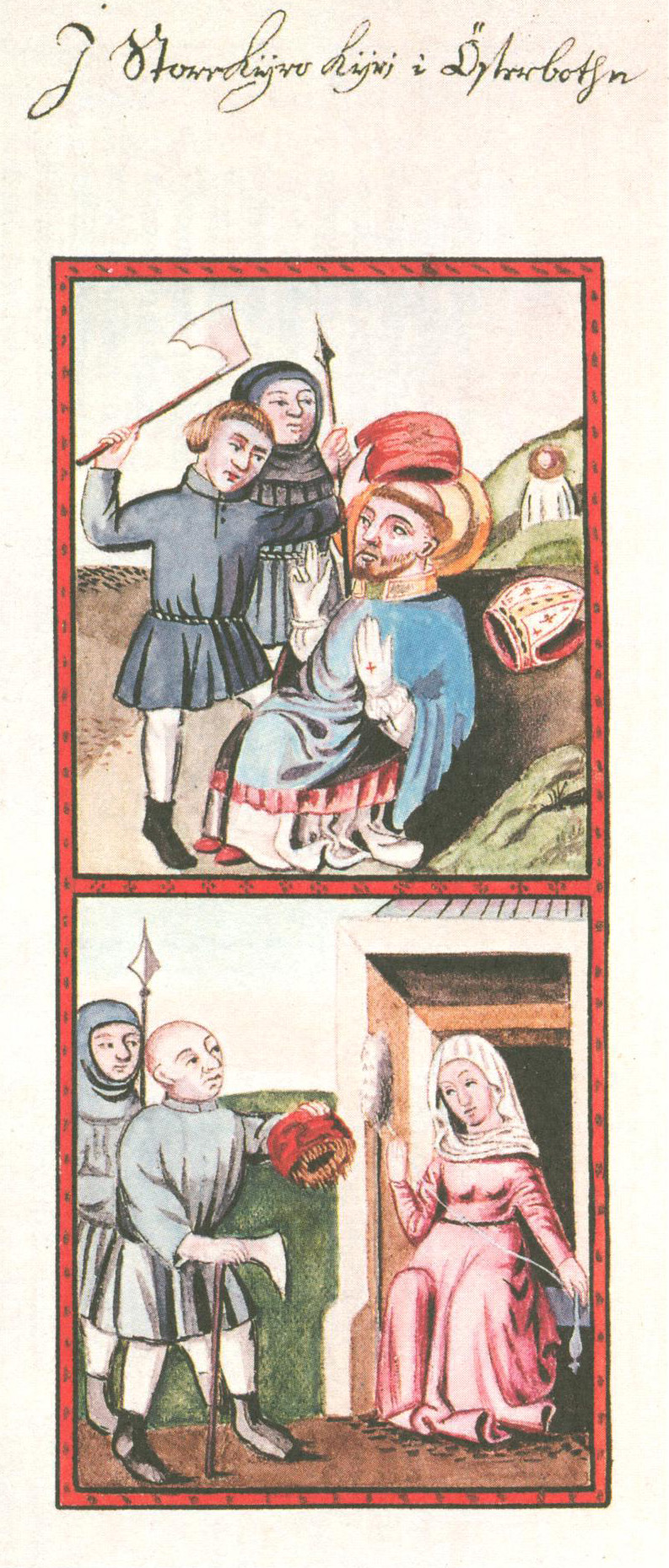
15th century imagery from a retable in the church of Isokyrö

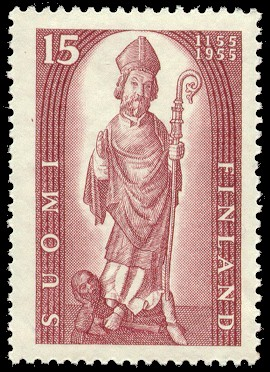
1955 stamp depicting a wooden sculpture of Henry stepping on Lalli, from the church of Isokyrö

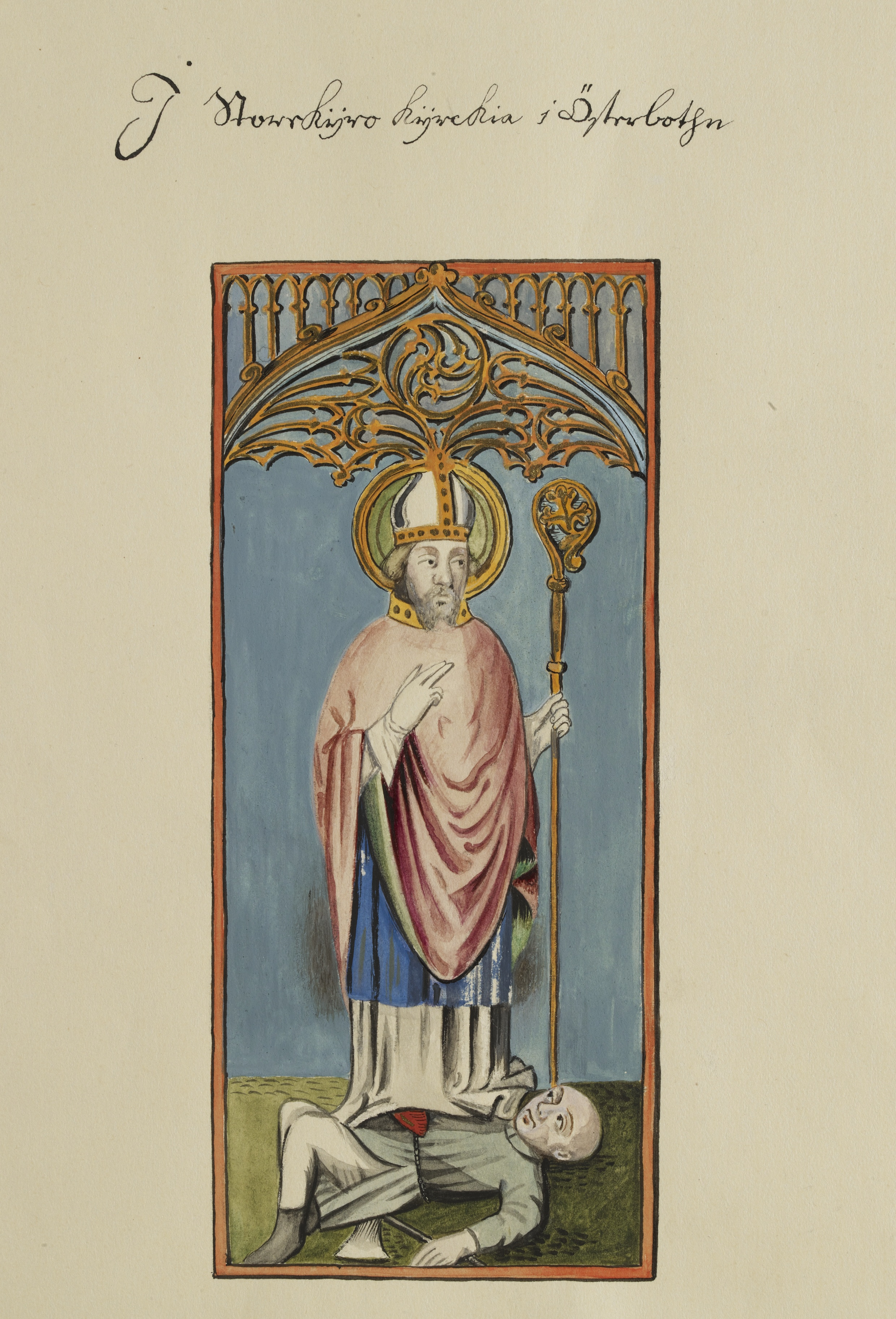
Henry on Lalli, 15th century Isokyrö church retable

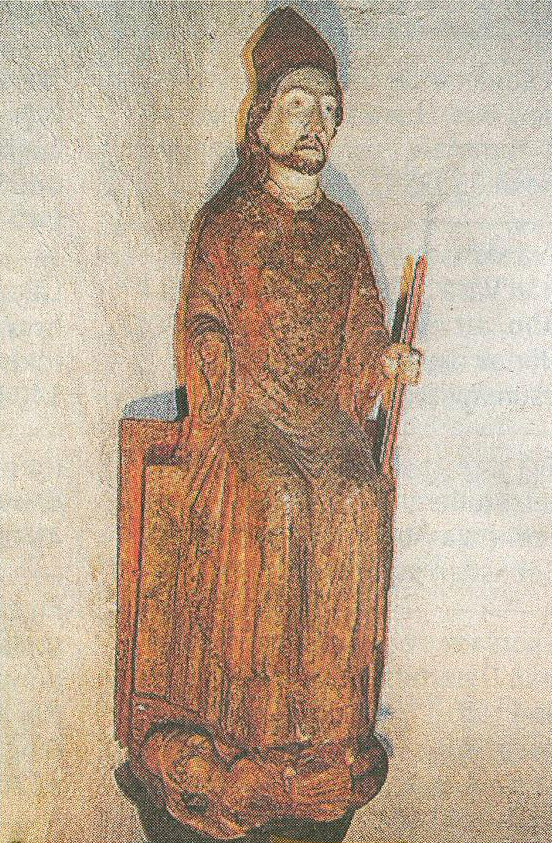
Wooden statue in the church of Pyhtää

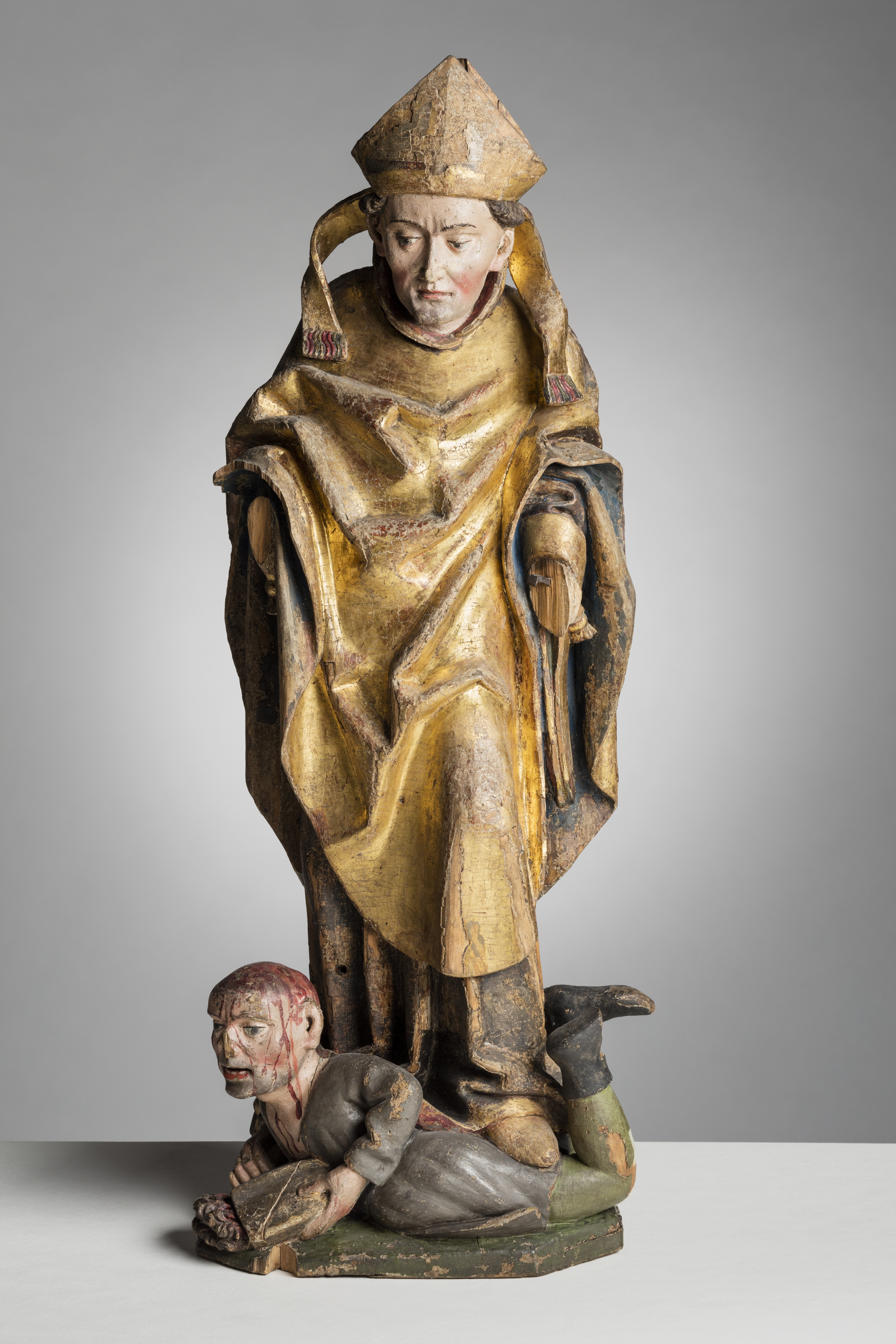
Wooden sculpture of Henry stepping on a bloodied Lalli from Akaa church, c. 1500

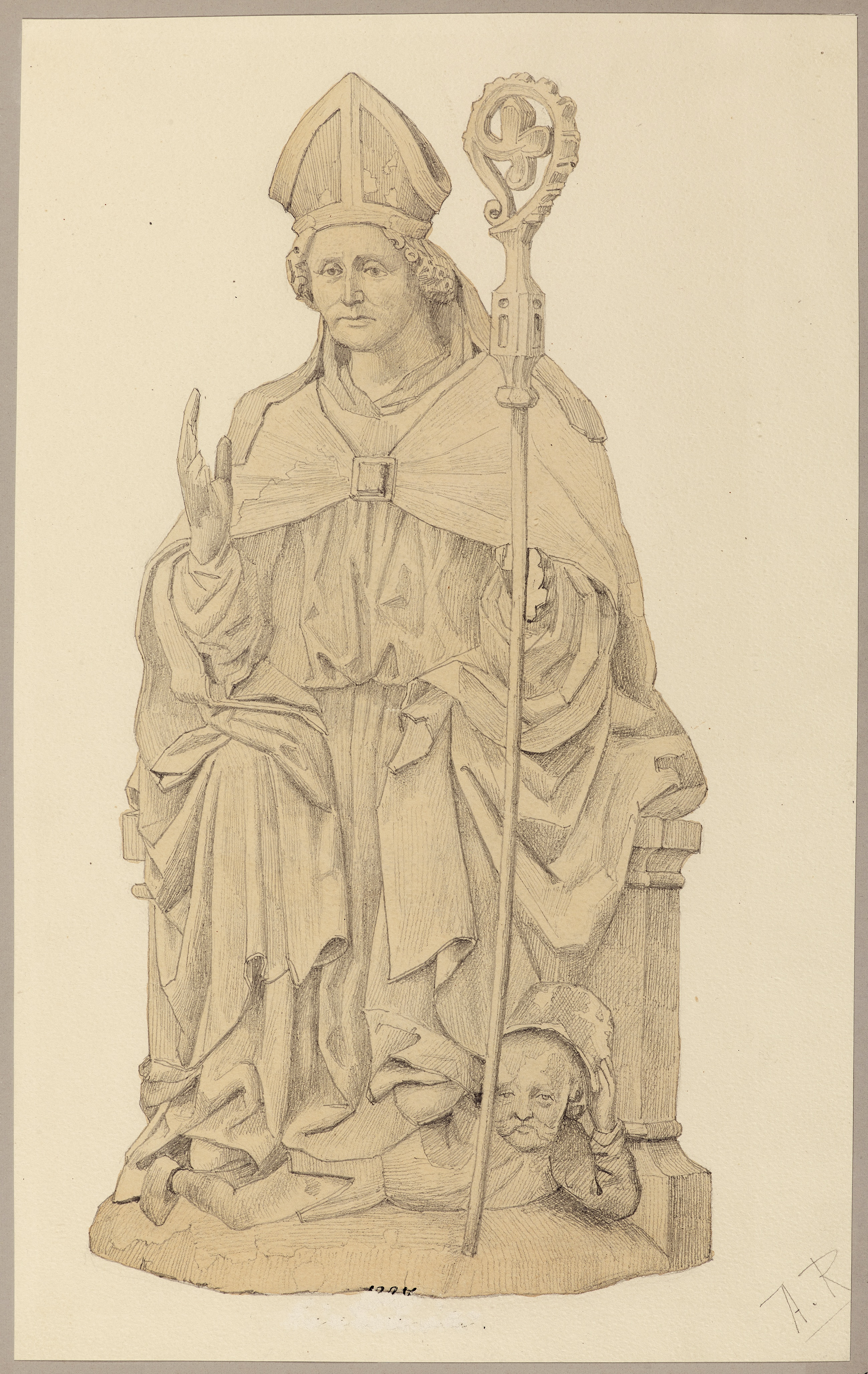
Drawing of a medieval wooden sculpture from Sääksmäki church

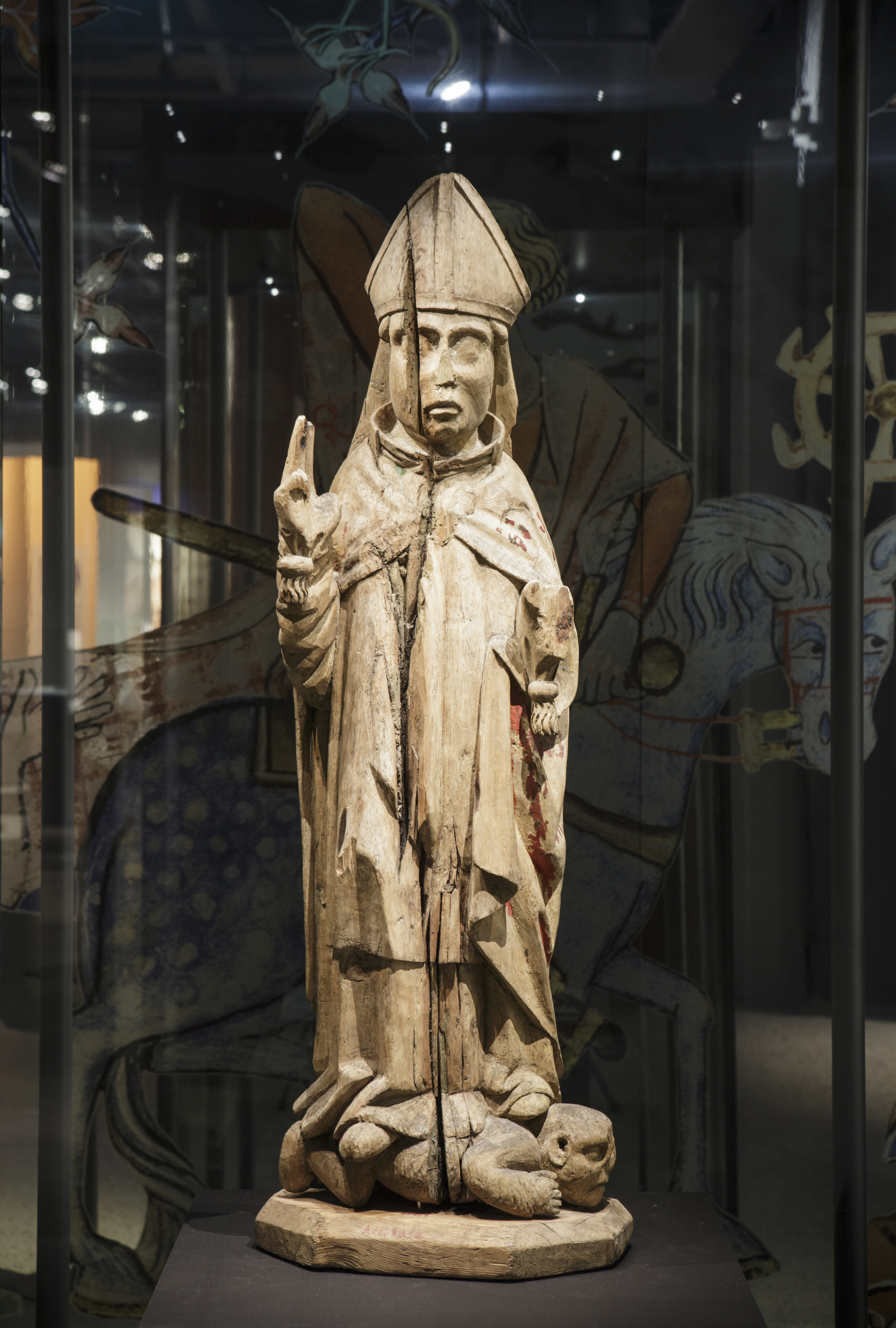
Once painted birch sculpture from Asikkala church, 1300–1500

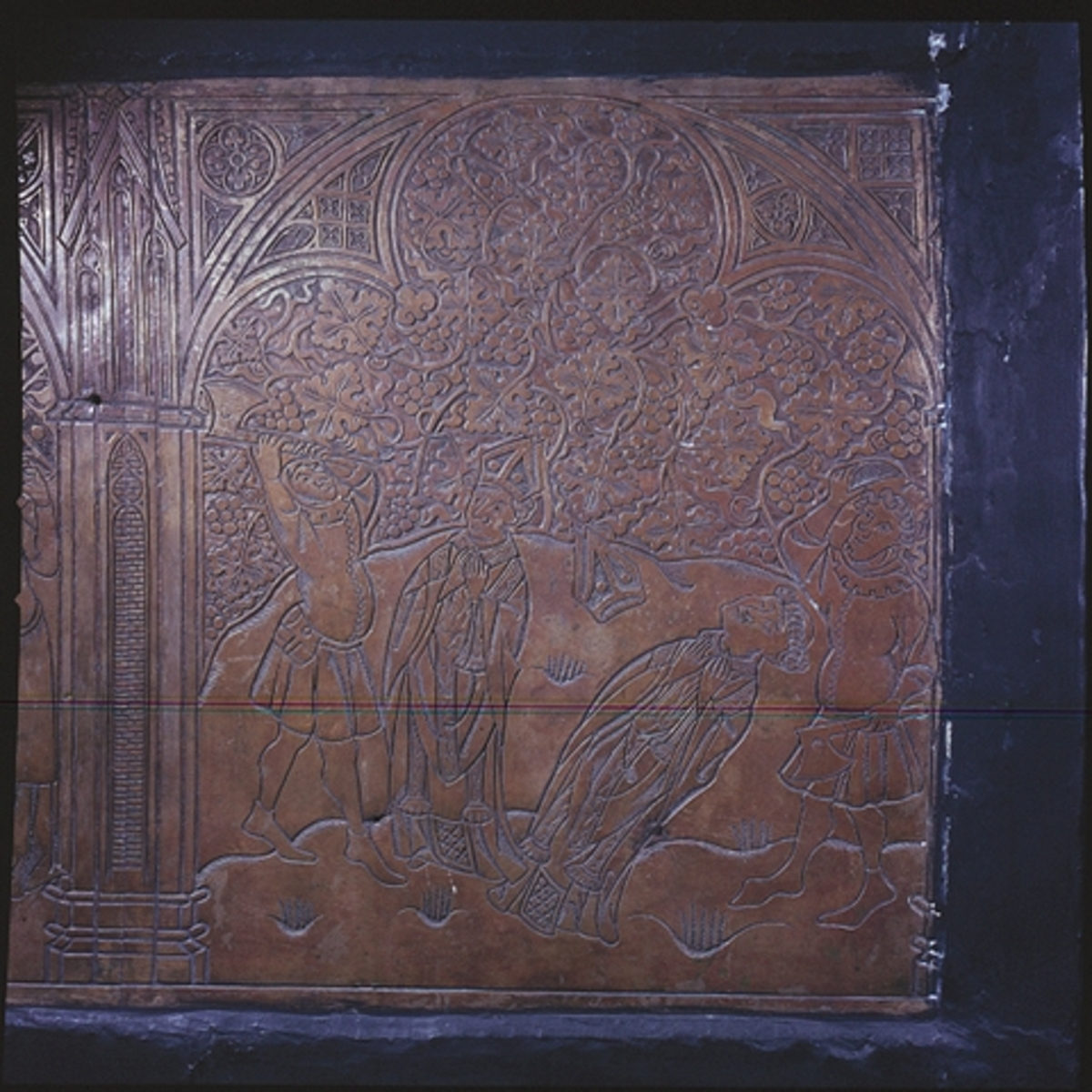
Decorative panel of Lalli slaying Henry and wearing his mitre from Nousiainen church, c. 1420

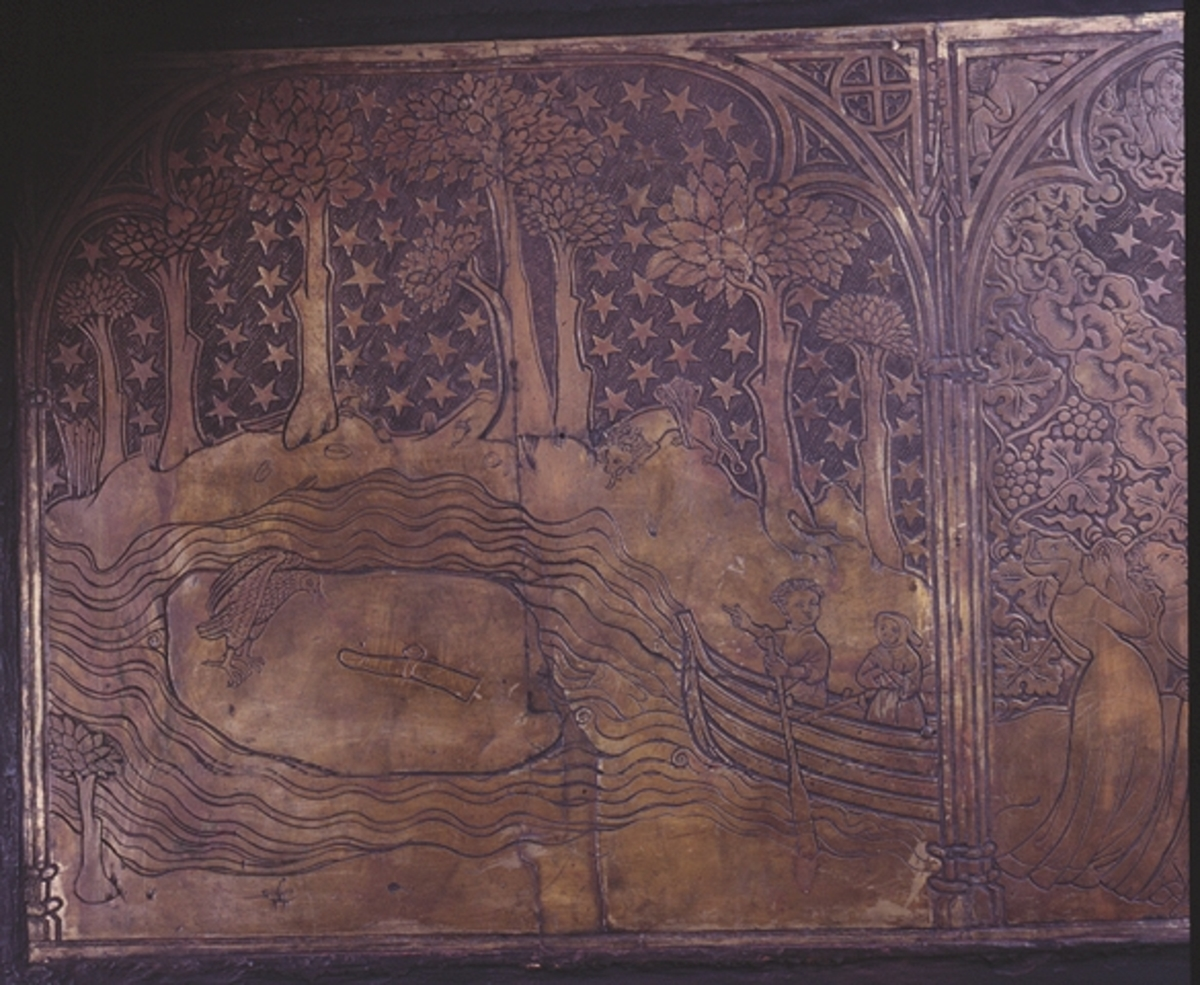
Decorative panel of Lalli's finger wearing Henry's ring being found in Spring on a block of ice, Nousiainen church c. 1420
