= Köyliö =

Köyliö Kjulo
- Former municipality
- Köyliön kunta Kjulo kommun
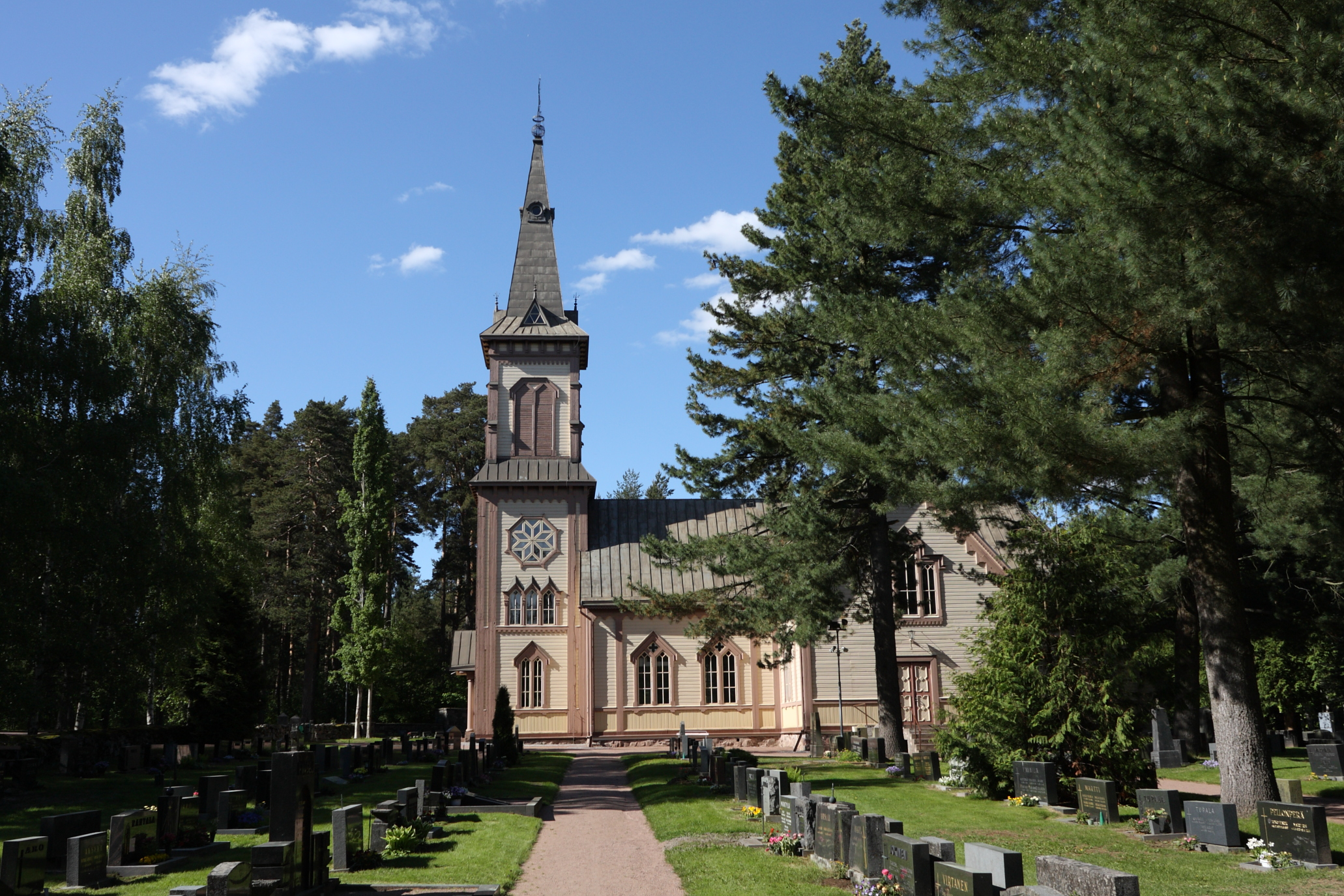
- Köyliö Church

- Coat of arms

- Location of Köyliö in Finland
- Coordinates: 61°7′7″N 22°18′27″E
- Country: Finland
- Region: Satakunta
- Sub-region: Rauma sub-region
- Charter: 1870
- Consolidated: 2016

Government
  - Municipal manager: Seppo Saarinen

Area
  - Total: 259.27 km^{2} (100.10 sq mi)
  - Land: 246.06 km^{2} (95.00 sq mi)
  - Water: 13.21 km^{2} (5.10 sq mi)

Population (2015-06-30)
  - Total: 2,665
  - Density: 10.83/km^{2} (28.05/sq mi)
- Time zone: UTC+2 (EET)
  - Summer (DST): UTC+3 (EEST)
- Website: www.koylio.fi

Köyliö (Finnish: [ˈkøy̯liø]; Swedish: Kjulo) is a former municipality of Finland. It was merged to the municipality of Säkylä on 1 January 2016.

It was located in the Satakunta region. The population of Köyliö was 2,665 (30 June 2015) and covered a land area of 246.06 km^{2} (95.00 sq mi). The population density was 10.8307/km^{2} (28.051/sq mi).

The municipality was unilingually Finnish.

It is said that the peasant Lalli murdered the English bishop Henry on the ice of Lake Köyliö in 1156 AD, during the first Swedish Crusade into Finland. A statue to Lalli was erected at Köyliö in 1989.

== Notable people ==
- Emil Cedercreutz (1879–1949), Baron and sculptor
- Harri Eloranta (born 1963), biathlete
- Wilho Laine (1875–1918), carpenter and politician
- Petteri Orpo (born 1969), politician; the current prime minister of Finland
- Jutta Rantala (born 1999), football player

== Twinnings ==
Before the 2016 consolidation, Köyliö was twinned with;

- Nora, Sweden (1944)
- Kõo, Estonia (1991)
- Fladungen, Germany (1996)
