= Köyliönjärvi =

Lake in Köyliö, Finland

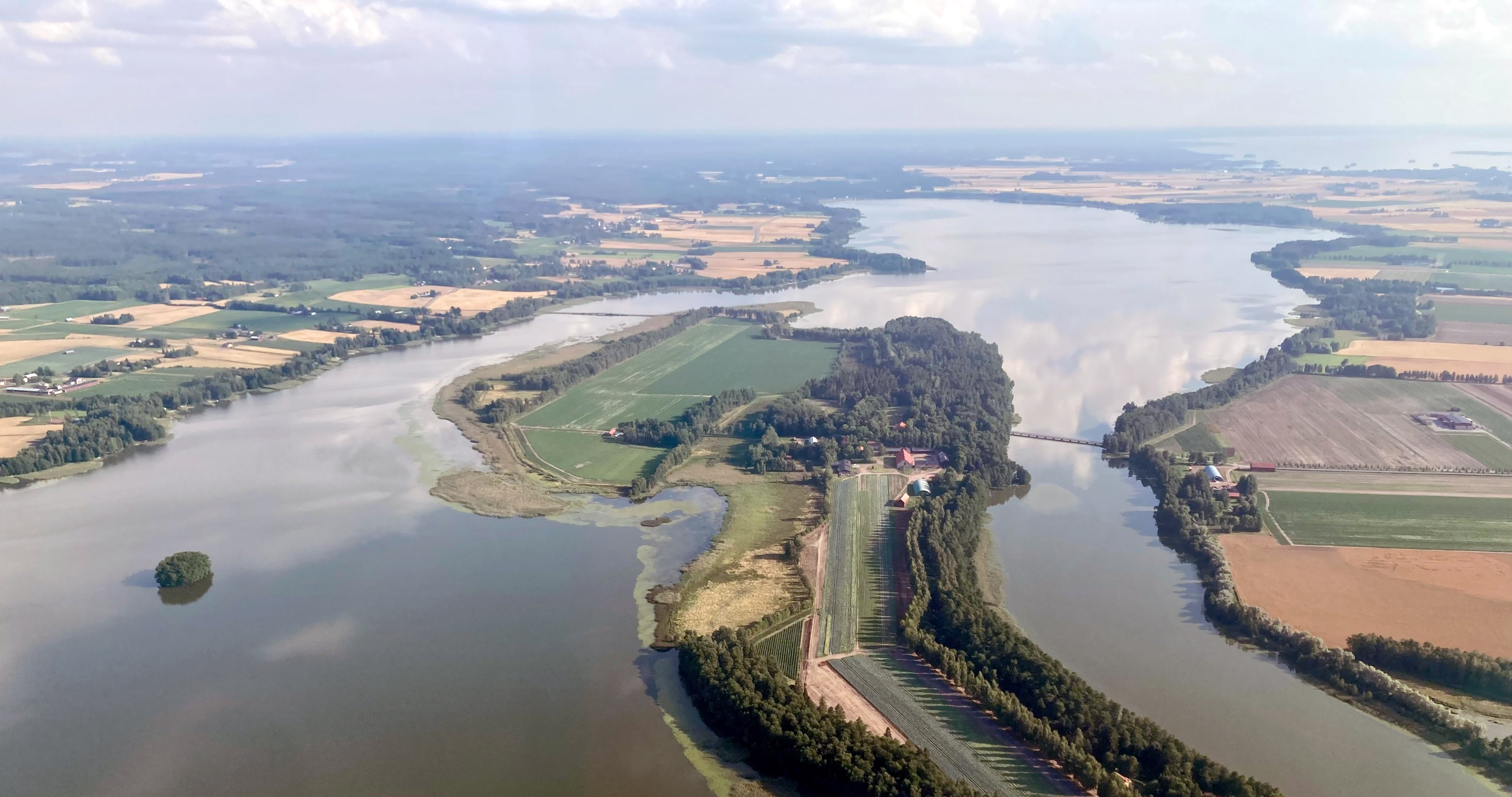
- Lake Köyliönjärvi and Kirkkosaari island.

- Location within Finland
- Location: Köyliö, Finland
- Coordinates: 61°08′14″N 022°19′36″E
- Primary outflows: Köyliönjoki
- Basin countries: Finland
- Surface area: 12.42 km^{2} (4.80 sq mi)
- Max. depth: 12.81 m (42.0 ft)
- Surface elevation: 40.5 metres (133 ft)
- Islands: 4
- Settlements: Köyliö

Köyliönjärvi (Lake Köyliö, Swedish: Kjulo träsk) is a lake in the municipality of Köyliö, Finland. Lake Köyliö and its surroundings are classified as one of the National landscapes of Finland. The area has been inhabited continuously since the Iron Age.

== History ==
Köyliönjärvi is the home of the first documented historical event in Finland as Saint Henry was allegedly murdered by peasant called Lalli on the ice of the lake in 1156. Kirkkokari Island is located near the murder site. It used to be a Medieval pilgrimage site for Roman Catholics.

Kirkkosaari is another and much larger island. Its first church was built there in the 15th century; the present church dates back to 1752.

== In popular culture ==
The story of Henry's death on the lake is the subject of the song "Köyliönjärven jäällä", by Finnish metal band Moonsorrow.
