= First Swedish Crusade =

Possibly mythical crusade

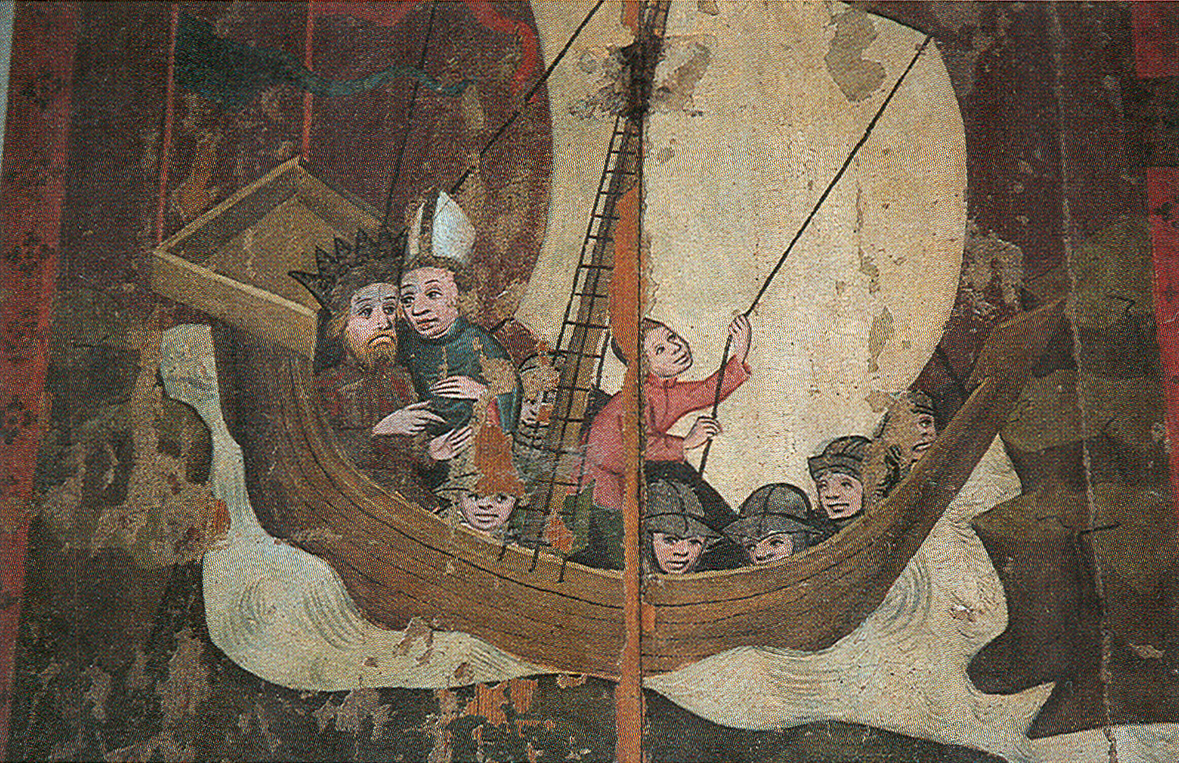
Eric IX of Sweden and Bishop Henry en route to Finland. Late mediaeval depiction from Uppland.

The First Swedish Crusade was a possibly mythical military expedition in the 1150s to Southwestern Finland by the Swedish king Eric IX and the English bishop Henry of Uppsala.

The earliest written sources of the crusade are from the late 13th century. The main sources of the crusade, the legend of Saint Erik and the legend of Saint Henry, describe the crusade as caused by the multiple raids of pagan Finns on Sweden.

The crusade has traditionally been seen as the beginning of Swedish rule over Finland and the first attempt of the Catholic Church and Sweden to convert Finnish pagans to Christianity. However, the Christianisation of Southwestern Finland is known to have already started in the 10th century, and in the 12th century, the area was probably almost entirely Christian. According to legends, after the crusade, Bishop Henry was killed at Lake Köyliö by Lalli. Henry later became a central figure of the Catholic Church in Finland.

== Veracity of the crusade ==
Academics debate whether this crusade actually took place. No archaeological data gives any support for it, and the earliest written sources are from much later. No surviving written source describes Finland under Swedish rule before the end of the 1240s. Furthermore, the diocese and the bishop of Finland are not listed among their Swedish counterparts before the 1250s. Also, the Christianisation of south-western Finland is known to have already started in the 10th century, and in the 12th century, the area was probably almost entirely Christian. It is possible that the Swedish bishop who had authority over Finland's bishop was the bishop of Linköping, not the bishop of Uppsala.

The First Novgorod Chronicle relates that in 1142, a Swedish prince and bishop, accompanied by a fleet of 60 ships, attacked Russian tradesmen; the circumstances are unclear, but indicate that Sweden and the Novgorod Republic were engaged in a struggle for the northern trade routes.

== Timing of the crusade ==
Almost every year of the 1150s has been suggested as the year that the crusade possibly took place. The most widely-supported years have been 1150, 1155, 1157 and 1158. Other candidates have been 1153, 1154 and 1156.

An expedition may have been made by Eric during his reign, which provided the basis for the legendary crusade. However, due to the short legend of Eric, it is assumed that the expedition did not last long. The ledung was assembled every year during the summer, and Swedish foreign policy became particularly active in the late 1150s and early 1160s. The Russian chronicle of Novgorod mentions Swedish campaigns in 1142, 1164, and 1201. The yearly expeditions did not allow Sweden to have steady control over the territories, with many Finns reverting to paganism after the Swedes had left.

== See also ==
- Second Swedish Crusade
- Third Swedish Crusade
- Northern Crusades
- Bishop Fulco

== Sources ==
- Line, Philip (5 December 2016) [2009]. "Chapter Sweden's Conquest of Finland: A Clash of Cultures?". In Murray, Alan V. (ed.). The Clash of Cultures on the Medieval Baltic Frontier. Routledge. pp. 73–100. ISBN 978-1-351-89260-5.
- Olesen, Jens E. (2016). "The Swedish Expeditions ('Crusades') Towards Finland Reconsidered". Church and Belief in the Middle Ages: Popes, Saints, and Crusaders. Amsterdam University Press. pp. 251–268. ISBN 978-90-8964-776-4.
