= Catholic Church in Finland =

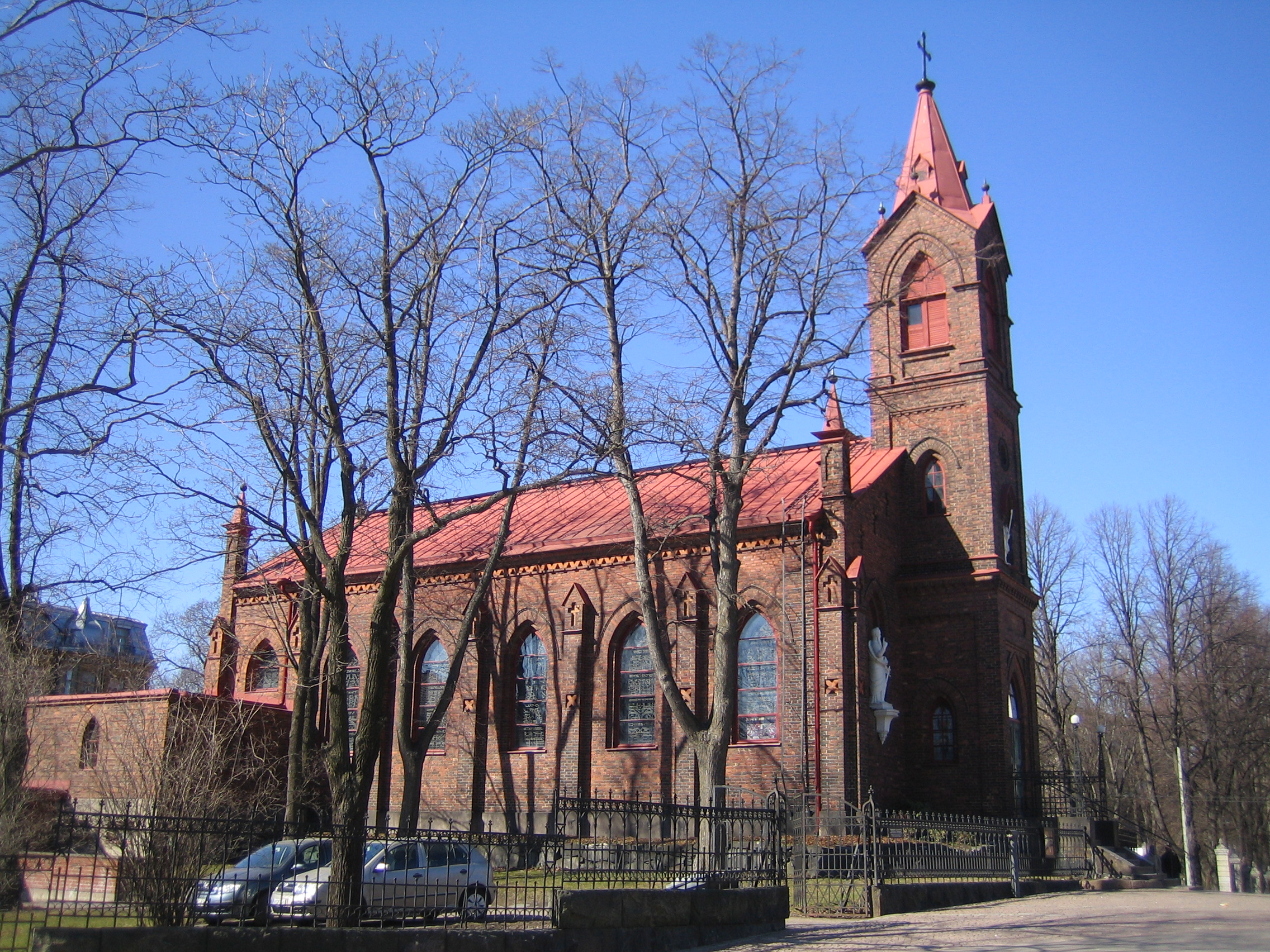
St. Henry's Cathedral, Catholic Diocese of Helsinki, Finland

The Catholic Church in Finland (Finnish: Katolinen kirkko Suomessa) is part of the worldwide Catholic Church, under the spiritual leadership of the Pope in Rome.

As of 2018, there were more than 15,000 registered Catholics in Finland out of a total population of 5.5 million. There were also an estimated 10,000 unregistered Catholics in the country. Of the more than 6000 Catholic families in the country, half were Finnish and the rest from the international community. Due to the small number of Catholics in Finland, the whole country forms a single diocese, the Catholic Diocese of Helsinki.

In a 2025 interview with the pontifical foundation Aid to the Church in Need, bishop Raimo Goyarrola stated that "Unlike other churches in the country, we do not receive state support and are therefore very poor", going on to explain that the Church struggles to maintain its pastoral outreach and charitable programmes. However, he also explained that despite the difficulties, the Church in Finland continues to grow steadily. "In Finland, a Catholic will often find himself the only one in his school or place of work. Despite this, Catholics don’t hide and are not afraid to let the people around them know that they are Catholics, or to speak to them about Christ. They speak naturally about the Eucharist and about Jesus. They are missionaries and apostles everywhere they go and are an example to the rest of the world".

As of 2018, there were five native-born Finnish priests, three of whom work in Finland. There are more than 30 priests from different countries serving in Finland. Since the 2019 retirement of Teemu Sippo, the first native-born Finnish Catholic bishop since the Lutheran Reformation, the Diocese of Helsinki is now under the leadership of Spanish bishop Most Rev. Raimo Goyarrola Belda.

The Catholic Church in Finland is active in ecumenical matters and is a member of the Finnish Ecumenical Council, even though the worldwide Catholic Church is not a member of the World Council of Churches. Bishop Goyarrola highlighted these ecumenical relations in a 2025 interview, explaining that "each month we celebrate Mass in 20 Lutheran churches and five Orthodox churches".

== History ==
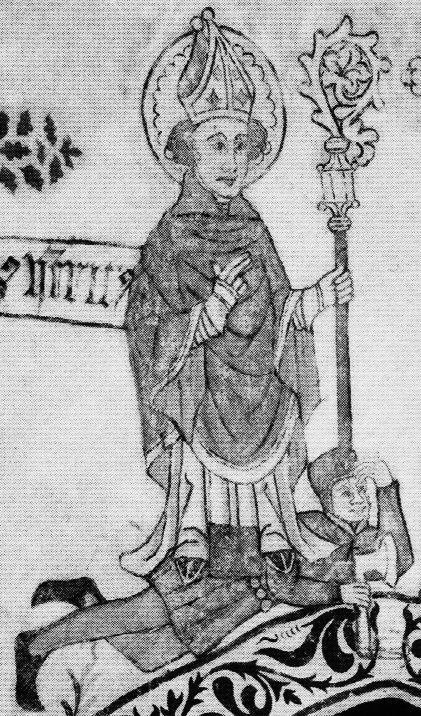
Henry, Bishop of Uppsala

Catholicism was the first form of Christianity introduced into the area of present-day Finland in the 12th century. In the 16th century, Finland, as part of Sweden, took part in the Lutheran Reformation after which Catholicism lost almost all ground in the area.

The first Catholic religious service in Finland following the death of the Catholic King John III of Sweden in 1592 was celebrated in 1796 in Turku by the Apostolic Vicar of Sweden, the Italian-born Father Paolo Moretti.

A parish was established in 1799 in Vyborg in the Russian part of Old Finland. After the rest of Finland became part of the Russian Empire in 1812, the parish covered the whole Grand Duchy of Finland. There were about 3000 Catholics in 1830. Until the 1860s, all the priests serving in Finland were Lithuanian Dominicans. The parish of Helsinki was founded in 1856, possibly due to the influence of the Governor General Friedrich Wilhelm von Berg's Italian wife, Leopoldina Cicogna Mozzoni (1786 – Warsaw 17 February 1874). St. Henry's Cathedral in Helsinki was finished in 1860.

In 1882 all the German priests and nuns were expelled. All foreign priests were expelled again in 1912. After Finland's independence and the departure of Russian military forces, which had included many Poles and Lithuanians, the Catholic Church lost most of its members.

In 1920 an apostolic vicariate was established in Finland. A parish in Turku was established in 1926, and in 1927 a parish in Terijoki. The Government granted the Catholic Church in Finland the status of religious community in 1929. Finland established diplomatic relations with the Holy See in 1942 and Pope Pius XII donated a significant sum of money to Finnish war orphans. After the war, the parishes in Vyborg and Terijoki, which had been located in territories that were ceded to the USSR, were moved to Lahti, and a new parish was founded in 1949 in Jyväskylä.

The Church of the Assumption of Mary was finished in Helsinki in 1954. The following year the apostolic vicariate was raised to a diocese. A parish in Tampere was established in 1957, a parish in Kouvola in 1985, and a parish in Oulu in 1992.

Catholic Church movements and groups are also active in Finland. One of these, the Neocatechumenal Way has established two Redemptoris Mater seminaries in Finland and maintains a presence both in Helsinki and in other towns, most notably Oulu.

A notable Catholic Finn in the early 21st century is the former head of the nationalist Finns Party, Timo Soini.

== Bishops ==
=== Bishops of Turku ===
- Henrik, 1134–1158
- Rodolfus, 1202?–1209?
- Folkvinus, 1210?–1234?
- Tuomas, 1234?–1245
- Bero, 1248 tai 1249–1258
- Ragvald I, 1258–1266
- Catillus, 1266–1286
- Johannes, 1286–1290
- Maunu I, 1291–1308
- Ragvald II, 1309–1321
- Pentti Gregoriuksenpoika, 1321–1338
- Hemming, 1338–1366
- Henrik Hartmaninpoika, 1366–1367
- Johannes Pietarinpoika, 1367–1370
- Johannes Westfal, 1370–1385
- Bero Balk, 1385–1412
- Maunu Olavinpoika Tavast, 1412–1450
- Olavi Maununpoika, 1450–1460
- Konrad Bitz, 1460–1489
- Maunu III Särkilahti, 1489–1500
- Laurentius Michaelis, 1500–1506
- Johannes IV Olofsson, 1506–1510
- Arvid Kurck, 1510–1522
- Ericus Svenonius, 1523–1527
- Martti Skytte, 1528–1550

=== Bishops from 1923 ===
Before the year 1955, Finland was an apostolic vicariate headed by an apostolic vicar, who was technically not the Bishop of Helsinki, but the titular bishop of a titular see, which is a defunct Roman Catholic diocese.

=== Apostolic Vicars of Finland (1923–1955) ===
Apostolic Vicars of Finland	Tenure	Additional information
Johannes Michael Buckx	May 23, 1923 – July 26 1933	Titular Bishop of Doliche
Willem Petrus Bartholomaeus Cobben	December 19, 1933 – February 25, 1955	Titular Bishop of Amathus in Palaestina. Appointed Bishop of Helsinki.

=== Bishops of Helsinki (1955–present) ===
Bishops of Helsinki	Tenure	Additional information
Willem Petrus Bartholomaeus Cobben	February 25, 1955 – June 29, 1967	Resigned
Paul Verschuren	June 29, 1967 – September 18, 1998	Resigned
Józef Wróbel	November 30, 2000 – June 28, 2008	Appointed Auxiliary Bishop of Lublin
Teemu Sippo	June 16, 2009 – May 20, 2019	First Finnish-born bishop in Finland since Arvid Kurck (1464–1522). Resigned.
Raimo Goyarrola	Since September 29, 2023	Incumbent

== Churches ==
Map of the Catholic parishes in Finland.

There are eight Catholic parishes in Finland:

1. St. Henry's Cathedral, Helsinki (Sub Centres – Tapanila (Vantaa), Porvoo)
2. St. Brigit & Blessed Hemming Church, Turku (Sub Centres – Åland, Eurajoki, Pori)
3. St. Olav's Church, Jyväskylä
4. St. Mary's Church, Helsinki (Sub Centres – Olari (Espoo), Hyvinkää, Karis)
5. Holy Cross Church, Tampere (Sub Centres – Hämeenlinna, Kokkola, Kristinestad, Jakobstad, Seinäjoki, Vaasa)
6. St. Ursula's Church, Kouvola (Sub Centres – Hamina, Kotka, Lahti, Lappeenranta)
7. Holy Family of Nazareth Church, Oulu (Sub Centres – Rovaniemi, Tornio, Kemi, Kajaani)
8. St. Joseph's Church, Kuopio (Sub Centres – Mikkeli, Savonlinna, Joensuu, Lieksa)

Masses are also celebrated at the sub centres of the above parishes and some Lutheran and Orthodox Churches on alternative weeks. There is a Catholic Church retreat and education centre named Stella Maris in Lohja.

There is a high demand for establishing a new parish in Northern Finland at Rovaniemi which is a major tourist destination in Lapland.

== Religious orders ==
The Bridgettine order is active in Finland with convents in Turku and Koisjärvi, near Lohja. A Carmelite convent, the Monastery of Our Lady of Mount Carmel in Finland was established in Espoo in 1988. The Dominican friars run a house in central Helsinki, home to a large library specializing in Christian studies and ecumenism named Studium Catholicum.

== Relics of Bishop Henrik ==
The ownership of the relics of Bishop Henrik caused some controversy between the National Board of Antiquities, the Catholic Church in Finland, and the Evangelical Lutheran Church of Finland. In 1998 the pastor of the Cathedral of Saint Henry in Helsinki wished to relocate Henrik's relics to the Cathedral, although they were previously exhibited in the Lutheran Cathedral of Turku. The National Board of Antiquities eventually chose to place the relics in the Cathedral of Saint Henry in Helsinki.

== Liturgical languages ==
Because half of the Roman Catholics in Finland are members of the international community, the Catholic Mass is regularly celebrated in 20 other languages in addition to Finnish. The languages beyond Finnish in which the Mass is celebrated include Swedish, English, Polish, Vietnamese, Tagalog, Italian, Spanish, Portuguese, German, Malayalam, Tamil and Hungarian.

== See also ==
- Religion in Finland
- Catholic Diocese of Helsinki
- List of Catholic dioceses in Finland
- St. Henry's Cathedral
- St. Mary's Church, Helsinki
- Archdiocese of Turku
