= Catholic Diocese of Helsinki =

Catholic diocese in Finland

Diocese of Helsinki Dioecesis Helsinkiensis Helsingin hiippakunta (Finnish) Helsingfors stift (Swedish)

Catholic
- Coat of arms

Location
- Country: Finland
- Territory: All Finland
- Metropolitan: Immediately subject to the Holy See
- Coordinates: 60°9′33.04″N 24°57′15.98″E

Statistics
- Area: 338,424 km^{2} (130,666 sq mi)
- Population: Total; Catholics: (as of 2024); ▲5,637,214; ▲17,243 (▲0.3%)
- Parishes: 8

Information
- Denomination: Catholic
- Sui iuris church: Latin Church
- Rite: Roman Rite
- Established: 1920 Established as Vicariate Apostolic of Finland; 1955 Erected as Diocese of Helsinki
- Cathedral: St. Henry's Cathedral
- Secular priests: 30

Current leadership
- Pope: Leo XIV
- Bishop: Raimo Goyarrola

Map
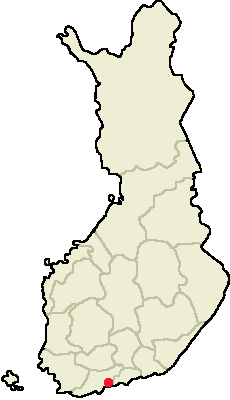
- The diocese of Helsinki comprises the entirety of the Republic of Finland. Helsinki is marked as a red dot.

Website
- katolinen.fi

The Diocese of Helsinki (Latin: Dioecesis Helsinkiensis) is a Latin Church diocese of the Catholic Church based in Helsinki, which comprises the whole of Finland. The diocese is divided into eight parishes. As of 2018, there are 15,000 registered and 10,000 unregistered Catholics living in Finland. There are more than 6,000 Catholic families in the country; 50 percent are Finnish and 50 percent are of international origin.

Bishop Raimo Goyarrola of Spain was chosen by Pope Francis to lead the diocese in September 2023. The bishopric was vacant from May 2019 when Bishop Teemu Sippo resigned due to poor health.

== Parishes ==
- St. Henry's Cathedral, Helsinki (Sub Centres - Tapanila (Vantaa), Porvoo)
- St. Mary's Church, Helsinki (Sub Centres - Olari (Espoo), Hyvinkää, Karis)
- St. Brigit & Blessed Hemming Church, Turku (Sub Centres - Åland, Eurajoki, Pori)
- St. Olav's Church, Jyväskylä
- Holy Cross Church, Tampere (Sub Centres - Hämeenlinna, Kokkola, Kristinestad, Jakobstad, Seinäjoki, Vaasa)
- St. Ursula's Church, Kouvola (Sub Centres - Hamina, Kotka, Lahti, Lappeenranta)
- Holy Family of Nazareth Church, Oulu (Sub Centres - Rovaniemi, Tornio, Kemi, Kajaani)
- St. Joseph's Church, Kuopio (Sub Centres - Mikkeli, Savonlinna, Joensuu, Lieksa)

There is a high demand for starting a new parish at Northern Finland at Rovaniemi as it is the major tourist destination for Lapland and Santa Claus.

== History ==
In 1550, the episcopate of the last Catholic bishop of Åbo ended. Thereafter Lutheranism prevailed in Finland. The Reformation in the sixteenth century caused the loss of almost all of Northern Europe from the Catholic Church. In 1582 the remaining Catholics in Finland and elsewhere in Northern Europe were placed under the jurisdiction of a papal nuncio in Cologne. The Congregation de propaganda fide, on its establishment in 1622, took charge of the vast missionary field, which - at its third session - it divided among the nuncio of Brussels (for the Catholics in Denmark and Norway), the nuncio at Cologne (much of Northern Germany) and the nuncio to Poland (Finland, Mecklenburg, and Sweden).

In 1688, Finland became part of the Apostolic Vicariate of the Nordic Missions. In 1783, the Apostolic Vicariate of Sweden was created out of parts of the Nordic Missions comprising then Finland and Sweden. In 1809, when Finland came under Russian rule, the Catholic jurisdiction passed on to the Metropolitan Archdiocese of Mohilev (then seated in St. Petersburg). In 1920, the Vatican established the Apostolic Vicariate of Finland which was erected as the Diocese of Helsinki in 1955.

== Episcopal ordinaries ==
=== Apostolic Vicars of Finland ===
1. Michael Buckx, SCI (1923–1933)
2. Willem Cobben, SCI (1933–1955)

=== Bishops of Helsinki ===
1. Willem Cobben, SCI (1955–1967)
2. Paul Verschuren, SCI (1967–1998)
3. Józef Wróbel, SCI (2001–2008)
4. Teemu Sippo, SCI (2009–2019 )
5. Raimo Goyarrola (2023 - )

== See also ==
- Catholic Church in Finland
- St. Henry's Cathedral
- St. Mary's Church, Helsinki
