= St. Ursula's Church, Kouvola =

Coordinates: 60.8712°N 26.6959°E

Saint Ursula's Church
- Pyhän Ursulan kirkko
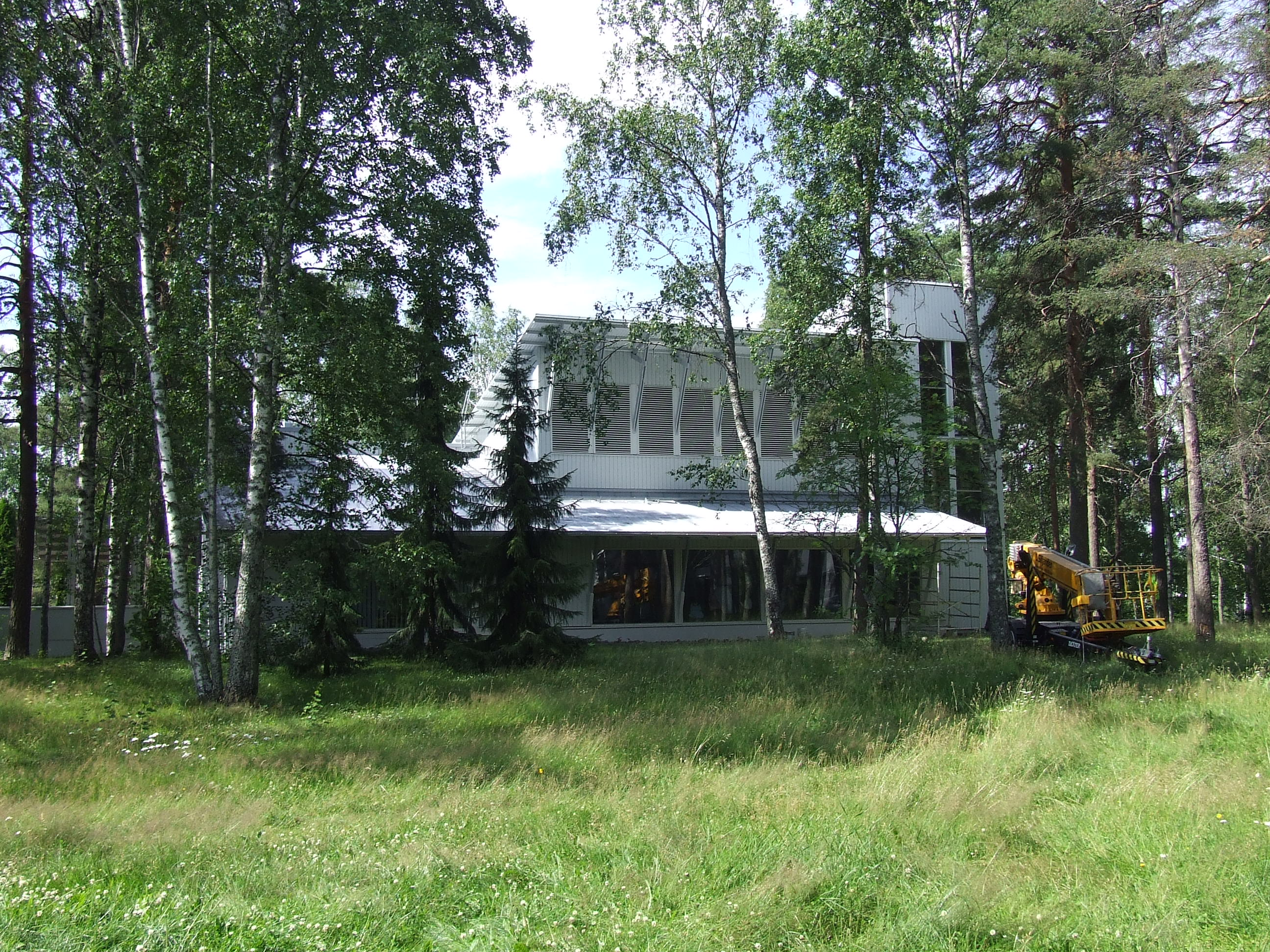
- Saint Ursula's Church
- Location: Kouvola
- Country: Finland
- Denomination: Roman Catholic Church

Architecture
- Architect: Benito Casagrande
- Completed: 1993; 33 years ago

Administration
- Diocese: Catholic Diocese of Helsinki
- Parish: St. Ursula Parish

The St. Ursula's Church is a Roman Catholic church in Kouvola, Finland. The congregation was founded in 1985, and at first the masses were celebrated in an apartment. The current church was inaugurated on December 11, 1993. It was designed by architect Benito Casagrande. The congregation got support for the church project from German Catholics. The current priest of the congregation is Father Jean Claude Kabeza.

== See also ==
- Roman Catholicism in Finland
- St. Henry's Cathedral
