= Holy Cross Church, Tampere =

Holy Cross Church
- Pyhän ristin kirkko Heliga korsets kyrka
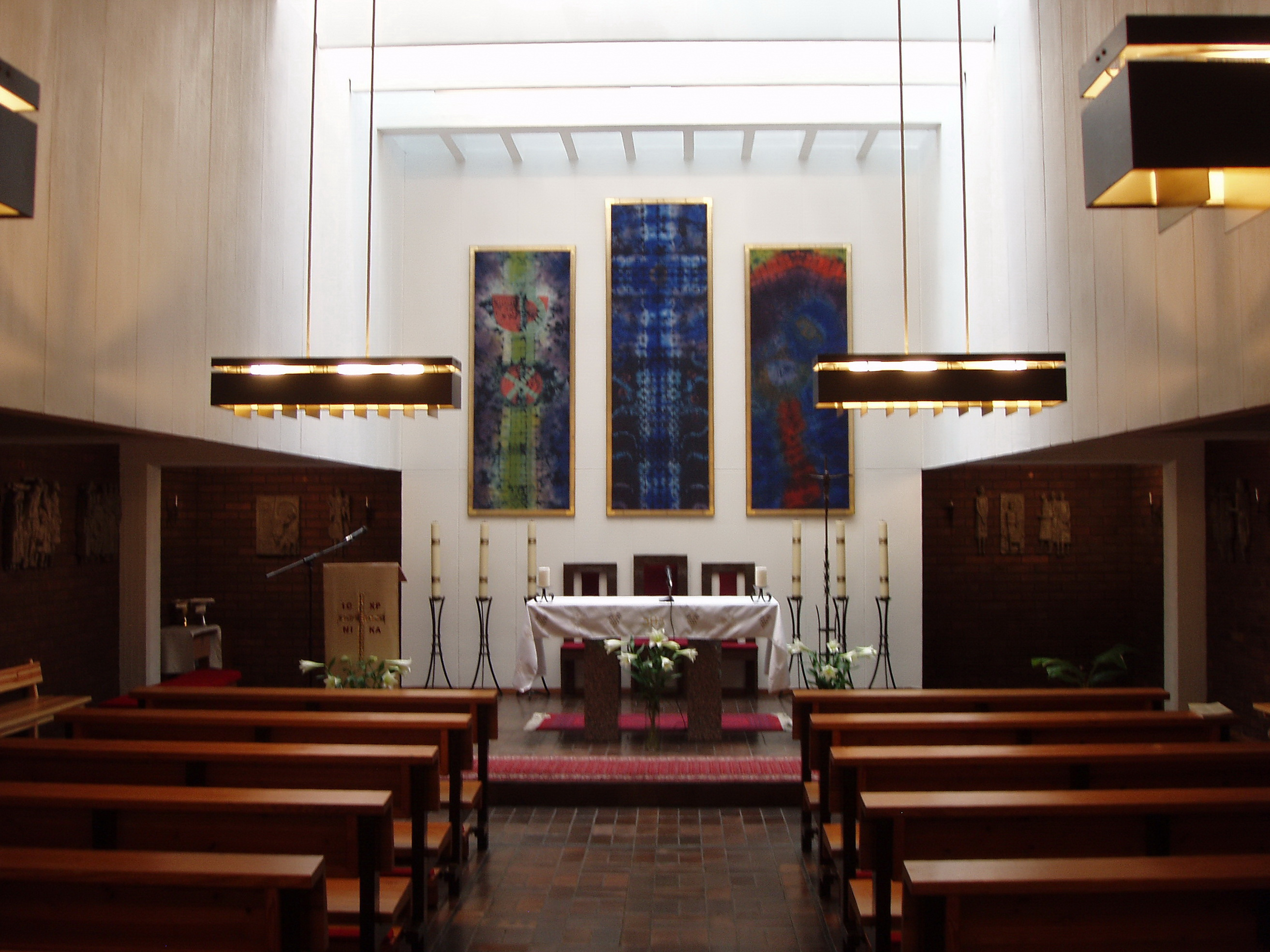
- Holy Cross Church's interior
- Holy Cross Church
- 61.498820°N 23.745297°E
- Location: Tampere
- Address: Amurinkuja 21A, 33230 Tampere
- Country: Finland
- Denomination: Roman Catholic Church
- Website: risti.katolinen.fi

History
- Status: Active
- Dedication: Holy Cross

Architecture
- Architect: Jaakko Ilveskoski
- Years built: 1969

Administration
- Diocese: Helsinki

Clergy
- Priest: Nguyen Toan Tri

The Holy Cross Church (Finnish: Pyhän ristin kirkko, Swedish: Heliga korsets kyrka) is a religious building affiliated with the Catholic Church located in the city of Tampere, Finland. It offers Mass in different languages (Finnish, Polish and English) in order to meet the different nationalities that make up the congregation.

The Catholic parish of Tampere was formally established on September 3, 1957. Masses were held for the first time in Hotel Tammer, later in Emmaus.

The congregation got its own church on November 22, 1969, being dedicated to the Holy Cross, and blessed with a parish hall, a presbytery, and other venues.

== See also ==
- Catholic Diocese of Helsinki
- Roman Catholicism in Finland
- St. Henry's Cathedral
