= Józef Wróbel =

The Most Reverend Józef Wróbel
- Bishop of Helsinki
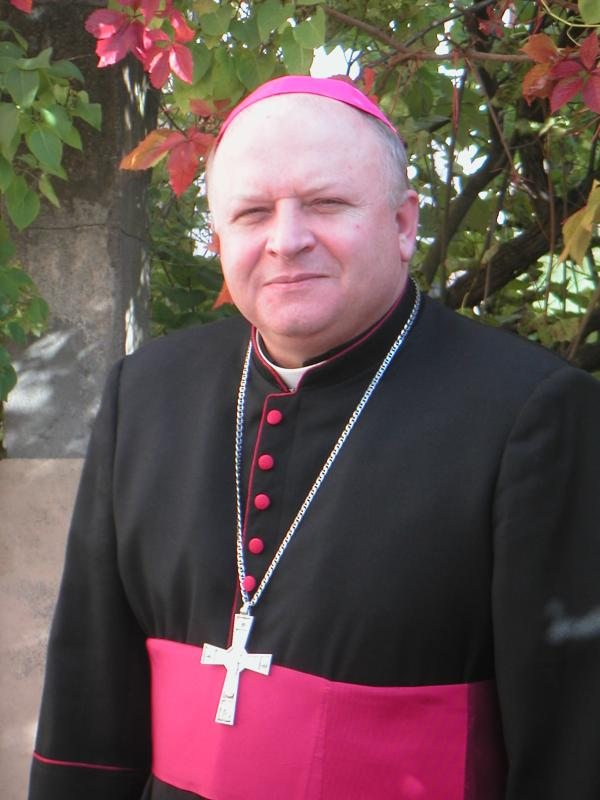
- Church: Roman Catholic Church
- Diocese: Roman Catholic Diocese of Helsinki
- Appointed: November 30, 2000
- Installed: January 27, 2001
- Term ended: May 28, 2008
- Predecessor: Paul Verschuren
- Successor: Teemu Sippo

Orders
- Ordination: June 12, 1979

Personal details
- Born: October 18, 1952 (age 74) Bestwina, Poland
- Coat of arms

Styles of Józef Wróbel
- Reference style: The Most Reverend
- Spoken style: Your Excellency
- Religious style: Monsignor

Józef Wróbel SCJ (born 18 October 1952) is a Catholic bishop, who was the Bishop of Helsinki from 2001 to 2008.

Before his term as the Bishop of Helsinki, he was a professor of moral theology in the Catholic University of Lublin. He was consecrated bishop on January 27, 2001 in the St. John's Church, which is a Lutheran Church. He was appointed as the auxiliary bishop of the archdiocese of Lublin and the titular bishop of Suas on June 28, 2008.
