= Teemu Sippo =

Roman Catholic Bishop of Helsinki

The Most Reverend Teemu Sippo S.C.I.
- Bishop of Helsinki
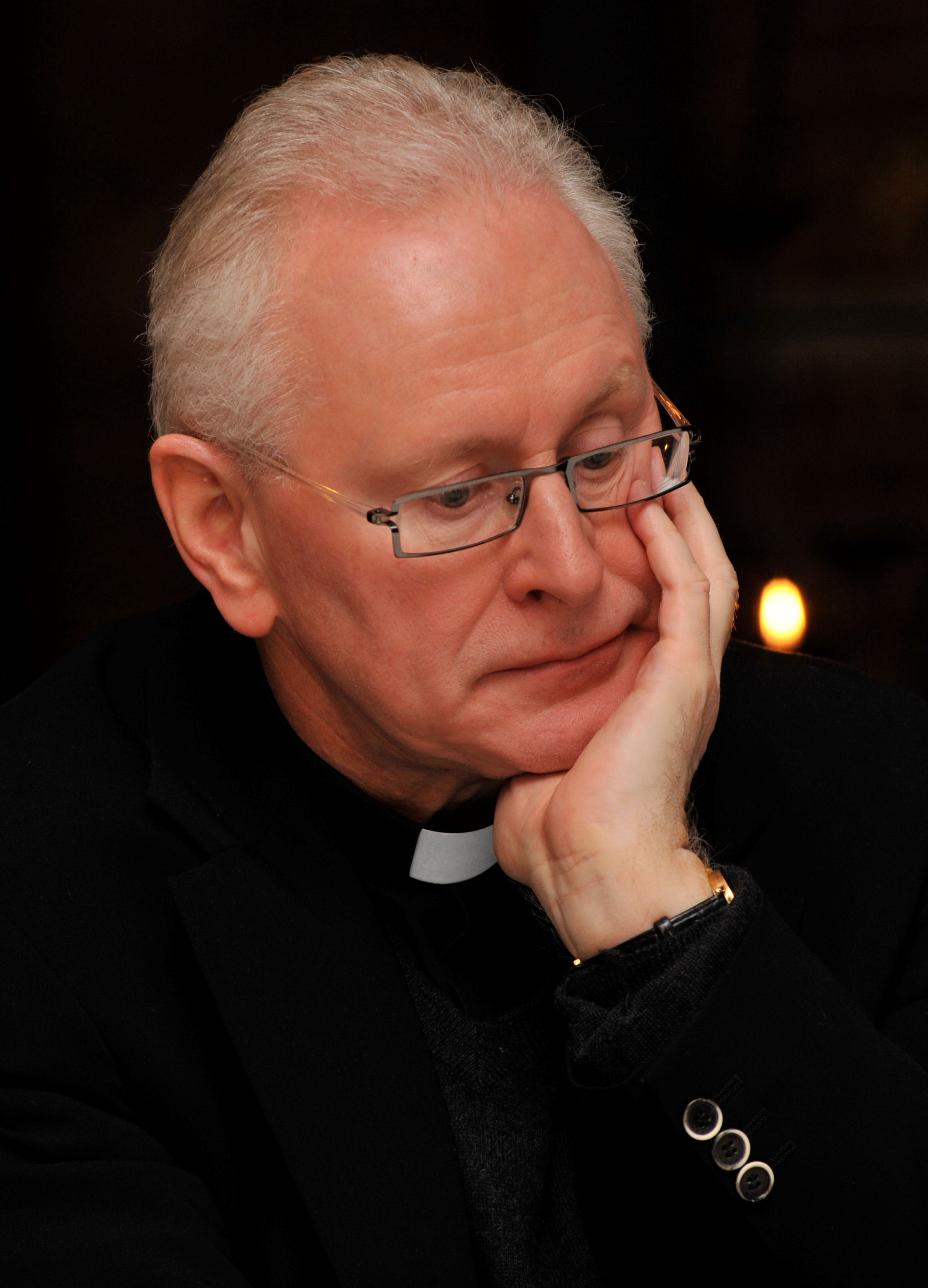
- Bishop Sippo
- Church: Roman Catholic Church
- Diocese: Roman Catholic Diocese of Helsinki
- Appointed: 16 June 2009
- Installed: 5 September 2009
- Term ended: 20 May 2019
- Predecessor: Józef Wróbel
- Successor: Raimo Goyarrola

Orders
- Ordination: 28 May 1977
- Consecration: 5 September 2009 by Karl Lehmann

Personal details
- Born: May 20, 1947 (age 79) Lahti, Finland
- Education: Albert Ludwig University, Freiburg
- Motto: Christus fons vitae (Christ is the source of life)
- Coat of arms

Styles of Teemu Sippo
- Reference style: The Most Reverend
- Spoken style: Your Excellency
- Religious style: Monsignor
- Posthumous style: not applicable

Teemu Jyrki Juhani Sippo, S.C.I. (born 20 May 1947) is a Finnish retired Catholic prelate who served as Bishop of Helsinki from 2009 to 2019. He was the first Finnish-born Catholic bishop since Arvid Kurck (1464–1522).

== Life ==
Teemu Sippo was born on 20 May 1947 in Lahti, Finland, into a Lutheran family. He converted to Roman Catholicism in 1966. Four years later he decided to start studying to become a priest. He became a professed member of the Congregation of the Priests of the Sacred Heart in 1970 and entered the seminary at the University of Freiburg. He wrote his Master's thesis on Paul Tillich's principle of Protestantism. His thesis advisor was Karl Lehmann. He was ordained a priest on May 28, 1977.

After that he worked in Helsinki and Jyväskylä. On 16 June 2009, Pope Benedict XVI appointed him Bishop of Helsinki, succeeding Josef Wrobel, who had been appointed auxiliary bishop of Lublin. He was consecrated bishop by Karl Cardinal Lehmann on September 5, 2009. His consecration took place in the Turku Cathedral, which is a Lutheran church.

Pope Francis accepted his resignation as bishop on 20 May 2019. Sippo cited health reasons for his early retirement. He had been hospitalized for three months following a fall in December 2018.

Sippo is a former Grand Prior of the Finnish Lieutenancy of the Equestrian Order of the Holy Sepulchre of Jerusalem.

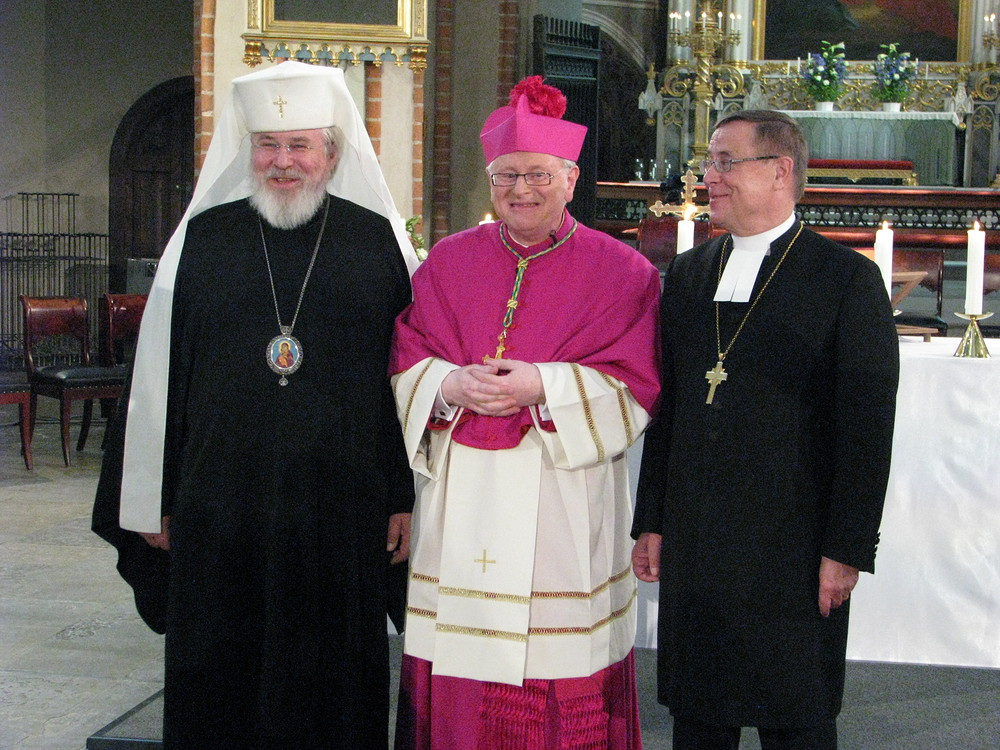
Orthodox archbishop Leo Makkonen, mons. Sippo and archbishop Jukka Paarma.
