= St. Mary's Church, Helsinki =

Catholic church in Helsinki, Finland

Coordinates: 60.1917°N 24.9003°E

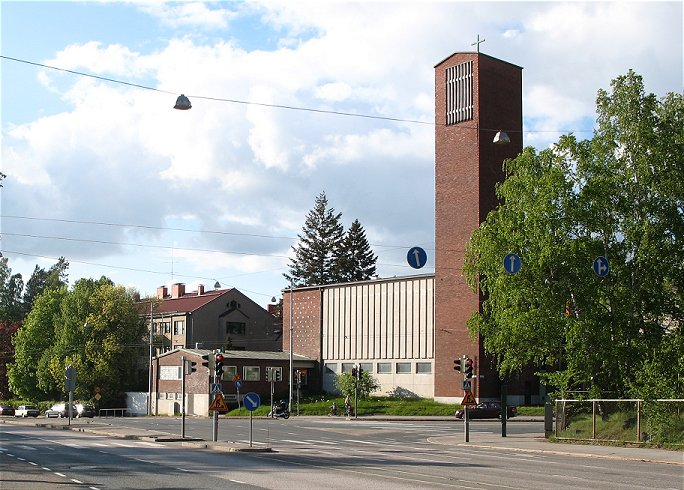
St. Mary's Church, Helsinki

St. Mary Catholic Parish (Finnish: Pyhän Marian kirkko, Swedish: Sankta Maria kyrka) is a Roman Catholic parish based in the Meilahti neighborhood of Helsinki, Finland. It is run by the Priests of the Sacred Heart.

The parish stretches from the western extent of Uusimaa to Riihimäki to Hanko. The parish area includes the diocesan retreat center, Stella Maris; the diocesan broadcaster, Redemptoris Mater; and the Carmelite convent in Espoo. Many parishioners are foreigners; regular services are held in Swedish, English, Vietnamese, Polish, Spanish, and German as well as Finnish.

St. Mary's was established in 1954, the second Catholic congregation in the western Helsinki area to be established since the Protestant Reformation. Bishop Willem Cobben consecrated the parish church on 6 December 1954, whose facilities include a church hall and rectory. A parochial school was opened the same year.

== Parish church ==
The church was designed by architect Kaj Salenius in the Modern style. The sanctuary is flanked by paintings of the patroness, the Virgin Mary, in depictions of the Woman of the Apocalypse and of the Assumption of Mary. These, along with the baptismal font, window paintings, and statue of Mary were created by the Dutch artist Lou Manche. The statue is a Madonna in the form of a Seat of Wisdom and carved from stone.

The current altar, set in the middle of the chancel, contains relics of Saint Bridget of Sweden and of her daughter Saint Catherine of Sweden. The old altar, set against the wall, contains relics of Saint Pius X, Saint Christopher, and Saint Maria Goretti. The altar wall, contributed in 1985, is a natural stone mosaic by German artist Claus Kilian of the Crucifixion of Jesus, surrounded by the Four Evangelists.

In the rear of the church is a mechanical two-manual organ with seventeen registers by Swedish artist Richard Jacoby in 1965. The bell tower has three bells which are rung on Sundays before Mass and on special occasions.

== See also ==
- Catholic Church in Finland
- Roman Catholic Diocese of Helsinki
- St. Henry's Cathedral
