= Raimo Goyarrola =

Roman Catholic Bishop of Helsinki

The Most Reverend Raimo Goyarrola Opus Dei
- Bishop of Helsinki
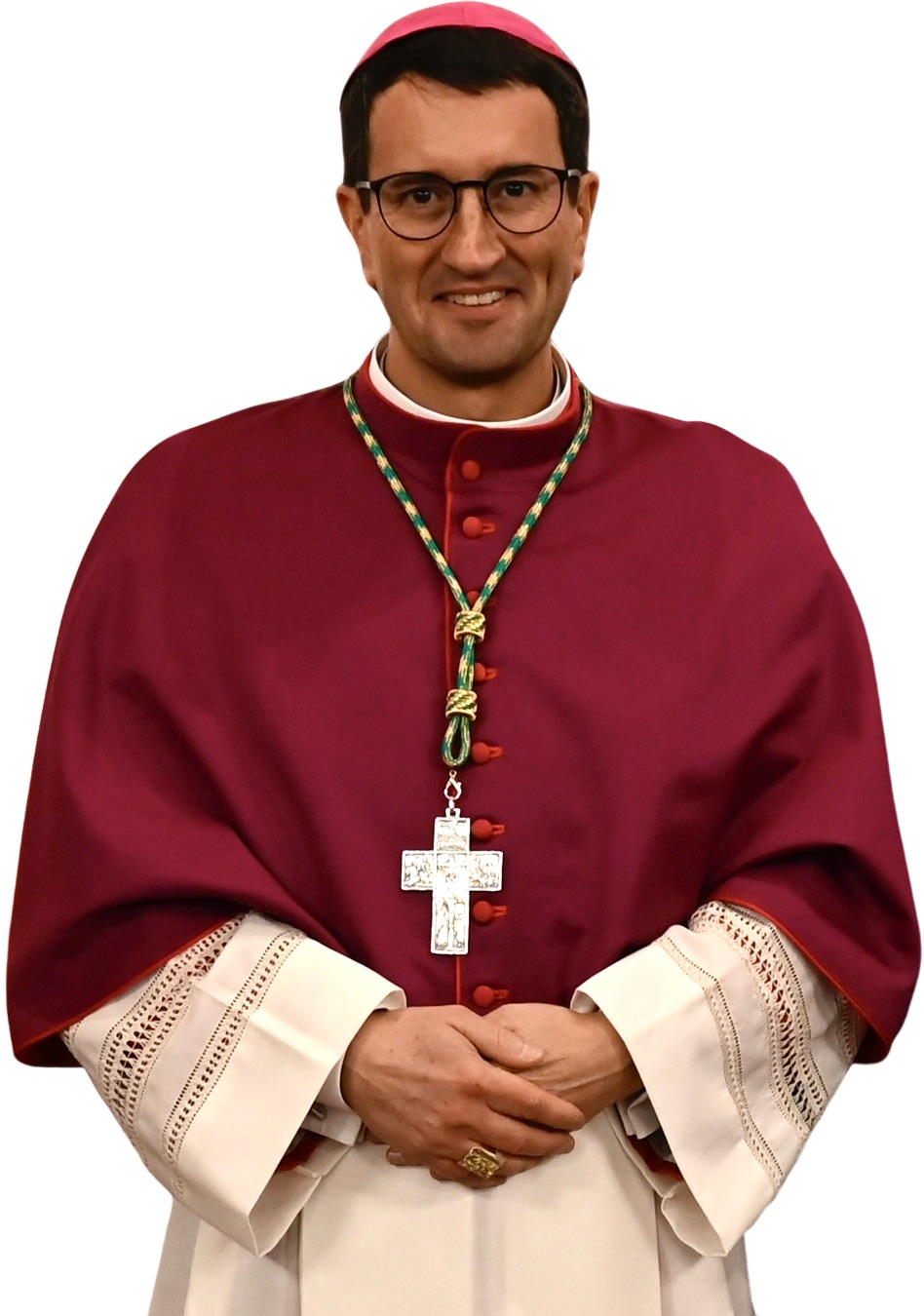
- Church: Roman Catholic Church
- Diocese: Diocese of Helsinki; Prelature of Opus Dei
- Appointed: 29 September 2023
- Predecessor: Teemu Sippo

Orders
- Ordination: 1 September 2002 by Javier Echevarría Rodríguez
- Consecration: 25 November 2023 by Anders Arborelius

Personal details
- Born: Raimo Ramón Goyarrola Belda; 20 July 1969 (age 57) Bilbao, Spain
- Denomination: Roman Catholic
- Motto: Servite Dómino in lætitia (Serve the Lord with gladness)
- Coat of arms

Styles of Raimo Goyarrola
- Reference style: The Most Reverend
- Spoken style: Your Excellency
- Religious style: Bishop

Raimo Ramón Goyarrola Belda (born 20 July 1969) is a Spanish prelate of the Catholic Church who has served as Bishop of Helsinki since September 2023. He is incardinated in the Prelature of Opus Dei.

== Early life and education ==
Ramón Goyarrola Belda was born in Bilbao on 20 July 1969. In 1987, the age of eighteen, he requested admission to the personal prelature of Opus Dei. After graduating with a degree in medicine and surgery from the University of Navarra in 1992, and in philosophy and theology from the Pontifical University of the Holy Cross in 2002, he obtained a doctorate in dogmatic theology.

Goyarrola has been a doctoral candidate in palliative care at the University of Eastern Finland in Kuopio since 2022 The doctoral dissertation entitled Spirituality in palliative care in Finland. Development of questionnaires to assess spiritual care was examined at the Faculty of Health Sciences on June 5, 2026

== Ministry ==
On 1 September 2002, Goyarrola was ordained a priest of the Opus Dei prelature. In 2006 he moved to Helsinki and began his pastoral work as chaplain at the Tavasttähti student residence and as University Pastoral Assistant in Helsinki. He then fulfilled several pastoral assignments: university chaplain at the Helsinki Commercial College, religion teacher at several public schools in Helsinki, and military chaplain. He represented the Diocese of Helsinki at the Ecumenical Council of Churches of Finland, where he was a member of the Ethics Committee and of the executive board.

In September 2011, Goyarrola became Vicar General of the Diocese of Helsinki. He has also been a member of the College of Consultors, of the Council of Priests and of the Diocesan Liturgy Commission. He is a postulator of the cause of canonization of Blessed Bishop Hemming and moderator of the Brotherhood of the Blessed Sacrament.

On 29 September 2023, Pope Francis appointed Goyarrola bishop of Helsinki. On 25 November, he was consecrated a bishop by Cardinal Anders Arborelius at St. John's Church in Helsinki, which is a Lutheran church.

Goyarrola emphasizes the importance of synodality, evangelization, and communication in Finland's growing Catholic diocese. Goyarrola also participates in the ecumenical work of Christian churches.

Goyarrola is the Grand Prior of the Finnish Lieutenancy of the Equestrian Order of the Holy Sepulchre of Jerusalem. In 2024 he was appointed Vice-President of the Permanent Council of the Nordic Bishops' Conference. In 2025, the Holy See appointed Goyarrola to lead the Catholic Church's dialogue with the Lutheran World Federation. In May 2026 Goyarrola was appointed a corresponding member of The Pontifical Academy of Life (Pontificia Academia pro Vita) for e five-year period ending in 2031.

In 2026, Goyarrola was appointed spiritual patron of the Portuguese Royal Confraternity of Saint Teotonio, and his official title has been established as His Excellency Bishop Dr Raimo Goyarrola (H.E. Most Rev. Bishop D. Raimo Goyarrola)

Goyarrola's other positions of trust include

- Founder of KatSote ry in 2022 (honorary chair since 2024)
- Vice-chair of the board of the Finnish Ecumenical Council (2025–2027)
- Member of the board of the Finnish Christian Medical Association (2026–2027)

Goyarrola has stated that euthanasia is never necessary He has also written a book on the subject, Eutanasia, which was published in 2013 He has publicly expressed his views on euthanasia and published an article on Spiritual Well-being and Suffering in Palliative Care in The Duodecim Medical Journal and discussed the topic in his book Arvokas kuolema (A Dignified Death).

Goyarrola has publicly spoken out in favor of maintaining religious education in Finland

Goyarrola has good Finnish language skills and he has acquired Finnish citizenship. After falling in love with Finland, he started using the Finnish first name "Raimo". Goyarrola has said that he learned Finnish by watching Moomins on Yle Areena.
