= Saint Joseph's Church, Kuopio =

Coordinates: 62.9011°N 27.7061°E

Saint Joseph's Church
- Pyhän Joosefin kirkko
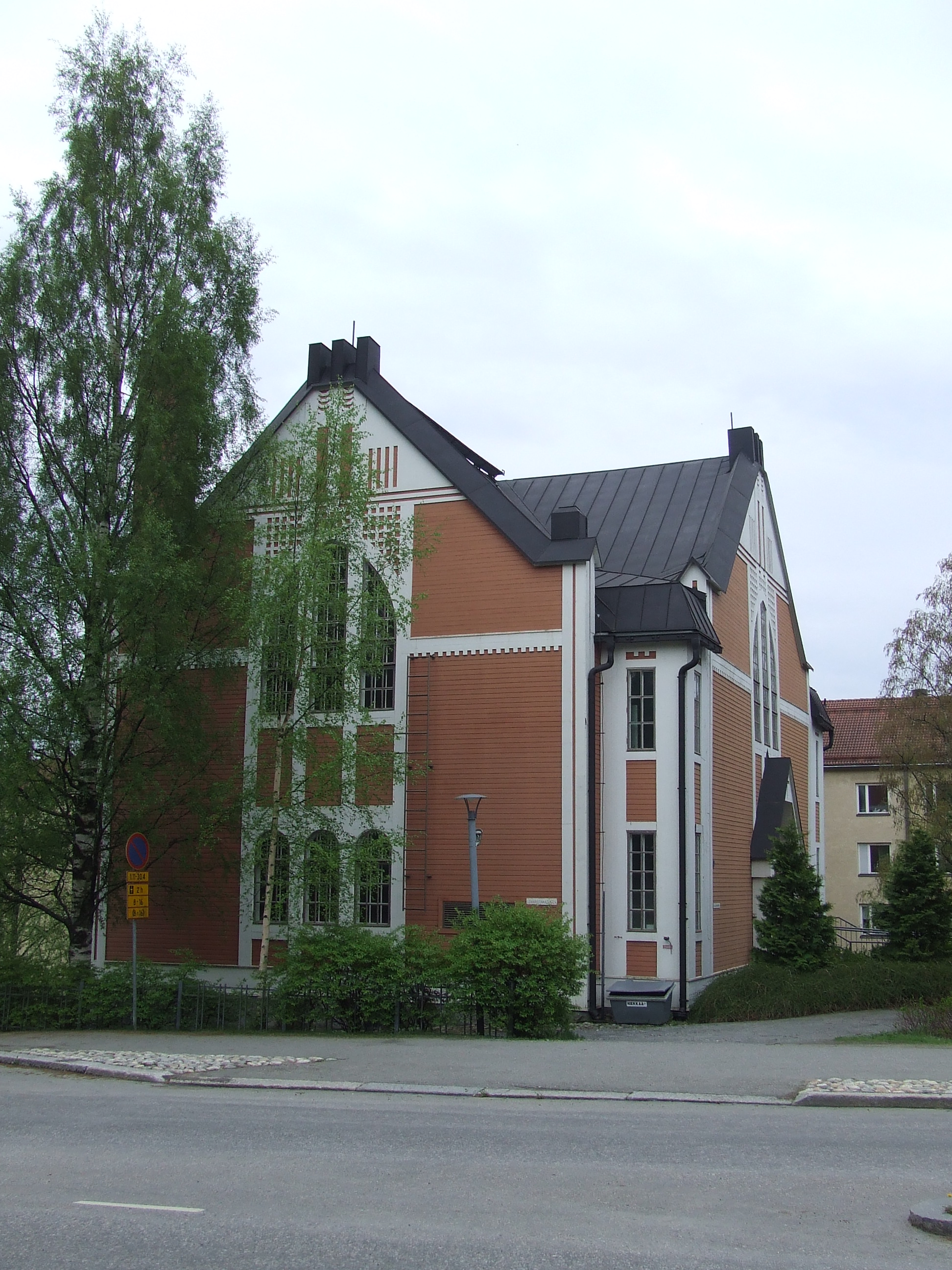
- Saint Joseph's Church
- Location: Männistö, Kuopio
- Country: Finland
- Denomination: Roman Catholic Church

The Saint Joseph's Church (Finnish: Pyhän Joosefin kirkko) It is a religious building located in Kuopio, a town in Finland, which is affiliated with the Catholic Church and was dedicated to Saint Joseph.

The church was originally built as a Lutheran church. It was built between 1912 and 1913. The chapel was inaugurated as a church in 1945 when the clock tower was acquired. The church was modified in the 1960s and more recently in 2002, when they returned to make some changes.

The Männistö Lutheran parish approved the sale to the Catholic Church in June 2013. The building was consecrated as a Catholic church, on May 3, 2014.

== See also ==
- Roman Catholicism in Finland
- St. Henry's Cathedral
