= Paul Verschuren =

Bishop in Finland (1925–2000)

The Most Reverend Paul Verschuren
- Bishop of Helsinki
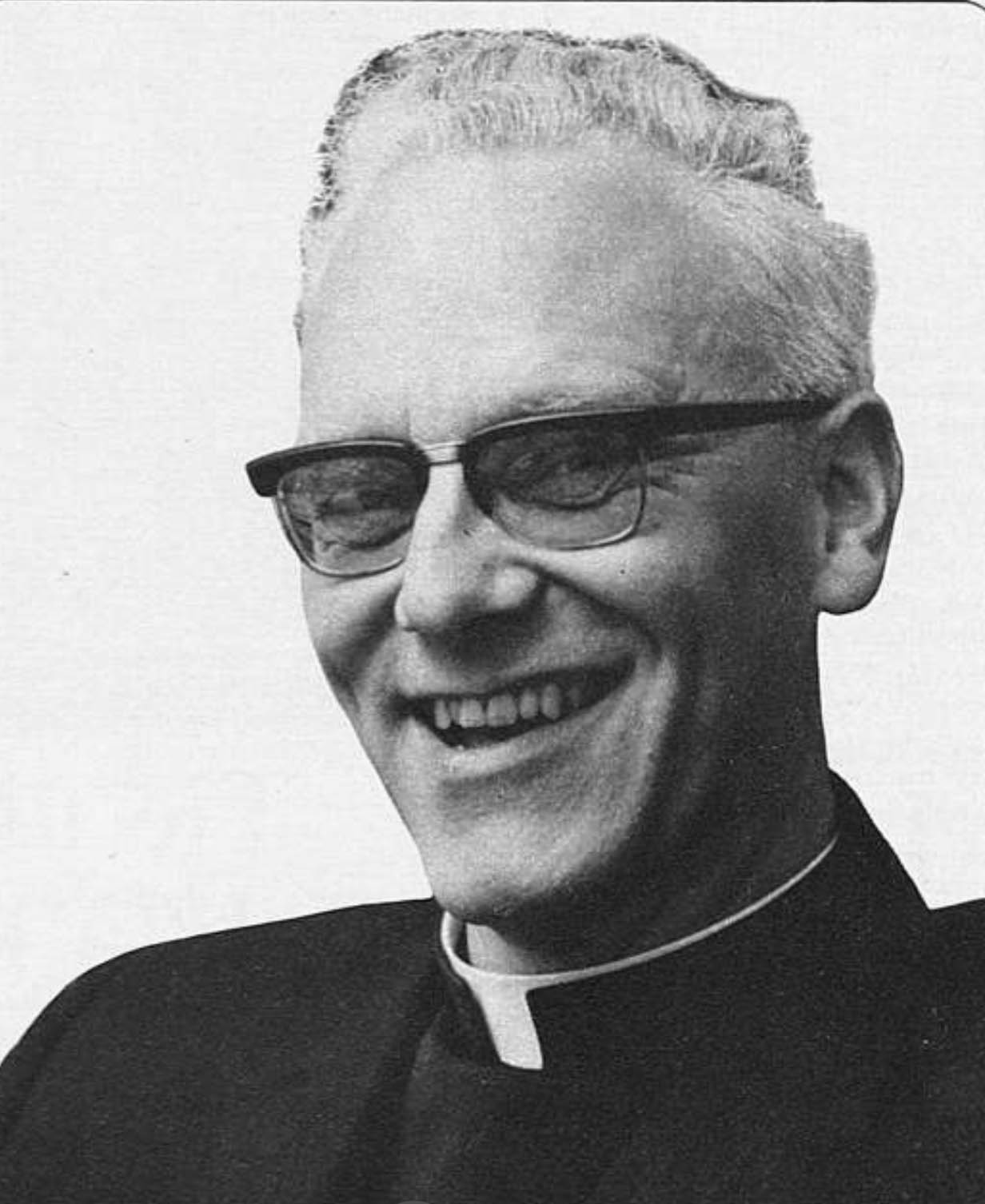
- Church: Catholic
- In office: 1967–1998
- Predecessor: Gulielmus Cobben
- Successor: Józef Wróbel

Orders
- Ordination: March 19, 1950

Personal details
- Born: March 26, 1925 Breda, Netherlands
- Died: February 19, 2000 (aged 74) Helsinki, Finland
- Motto: In Christo Omnes (Everything in Christ)
- Coat of arms

Paul Michael Verschuren SCJ (26 March 1925 – 19 February 2000) was a Catholic priest and bishop. He was a Doctor of Canon Law from the Pontifical Gregorian University. He moved to Finland to be the Auxiliary Bishop of the Diocese of Helsinki and was later Bishop of Helsinki from 1967 to 1998.

Verschuren was ordained in the year 1950. In 1964 he was consecrated titular bishop of Aquae Sirenses to be the auxiliary bishop of Helsinki. As the auxiliary bishop, he prepared to be the successor of bishop Gulielmus Cobben, who later ordained him to be bishop of Helsinki in 1967. Verschuren learned both languages of Finland, Finnish and Swedish, quickly. He achieved the status of a public intellectual in Finland and was known for his ecumenism.

He resigned in September 1998 due to leukemia and died in February 2000. He is buried in the Catholic graveyard of Turku.

Styles of Paul Verschuren
- Reference style: The Most Reverend
- Spoken style: Your Excellency
- Religious style: Monsignor

== See also ==
- Catholic Church in Finland
