= St. Bridget and Blessed Hemming Church =

Coordinates: 60.4500°N 22.2550°E

- Pyhän Birgitan ja Autuaan Hemmingin kirkko Sankta Birgittas och salige Hemmings kyrka
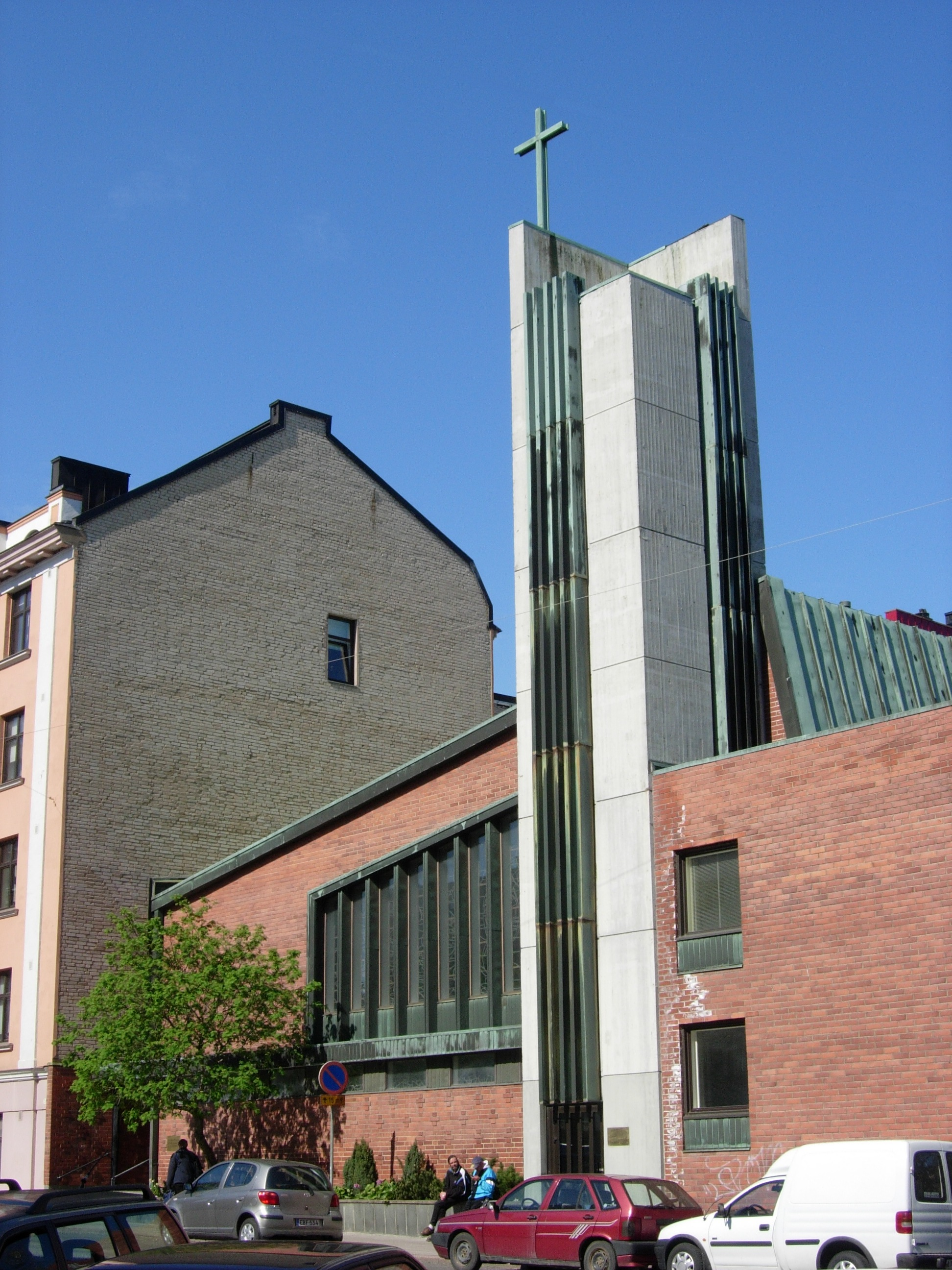
- St. Bridget and Blessed Hemming Church
- Location: Turku
- Country: Finland
- Denomination: Roman Catholic Church

St. Bridget and Blessed Hemming Church (Finnish: Pyhän Birgitan ja Autuaan Hemmingin kirkko, Swedish: Sankta Birgittas och salige Hemmings kyrka) is a parish of the Roman Catholic Church in Turku, Finland. The church building, completed in 1966, is located in the center of Turku in Ursininkatu. It was consecrated in honor of St. Bridget of Sweden and bishop Hemming of Turku.

It is part of a group of Catholic parish buildings that were completed after 1966, including an administrative office and a residence. The Catholic history of Turku goes back over 80 years, with 1,194 members as of 2005, most of whom have foreign backgrounds (notably immigrants from Southeast Asia and Poland). The parish priest Father Peter Gebara SCJ (Brotherhood of the Sacred Heart of Jesus or Jeesuksen Pyhän Sydämen Veljeskunta), a native of Poland. The Church of Turku also has links to the Order of St. Brigid (birgittalaisluostari), a Catholic convent.

== See also ==
- Catholic Church in Finland
- St. Henry's Cathedral
