= Koskela, Oulu =

Koskela
- District of Oulu
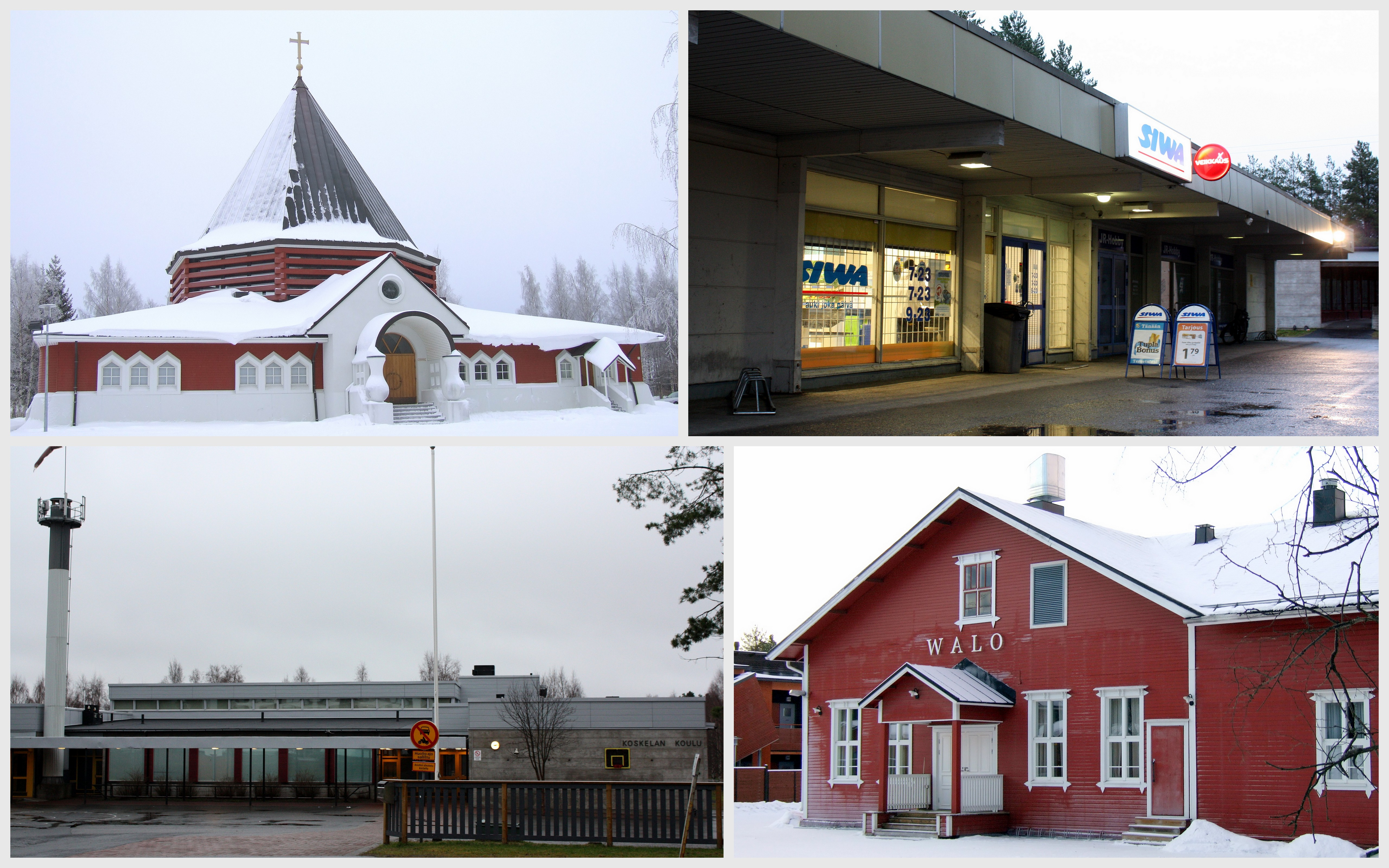
- Interactive map of Koskela
- Country: Finland
- City: Oulu
- Areas of Oulu: Koskela area

Population (2013)
  - Total: 3 478
- Postal code: 90560

Koskela is a district of Oulu, Finland. It is bounded by the National road 4 in the east and north, the Toppila and Taskila districts in the west and the Alppila district in the south.

Koskela is mainly residential area with schools and other public services located at the Tullimiehentie street. The elementary school in Koskela has been a teacher training school of the University of Oulu since August 2013.

Holy Family of Nazareth Church, a Roman Catholic church, is located in Koskela.
