= St. Olaf's Church, Jyväskylä =

Coordinates: 62.2479°N 25.7483°E

St. Olaf's Church
- Pyhän Olavin kirkko
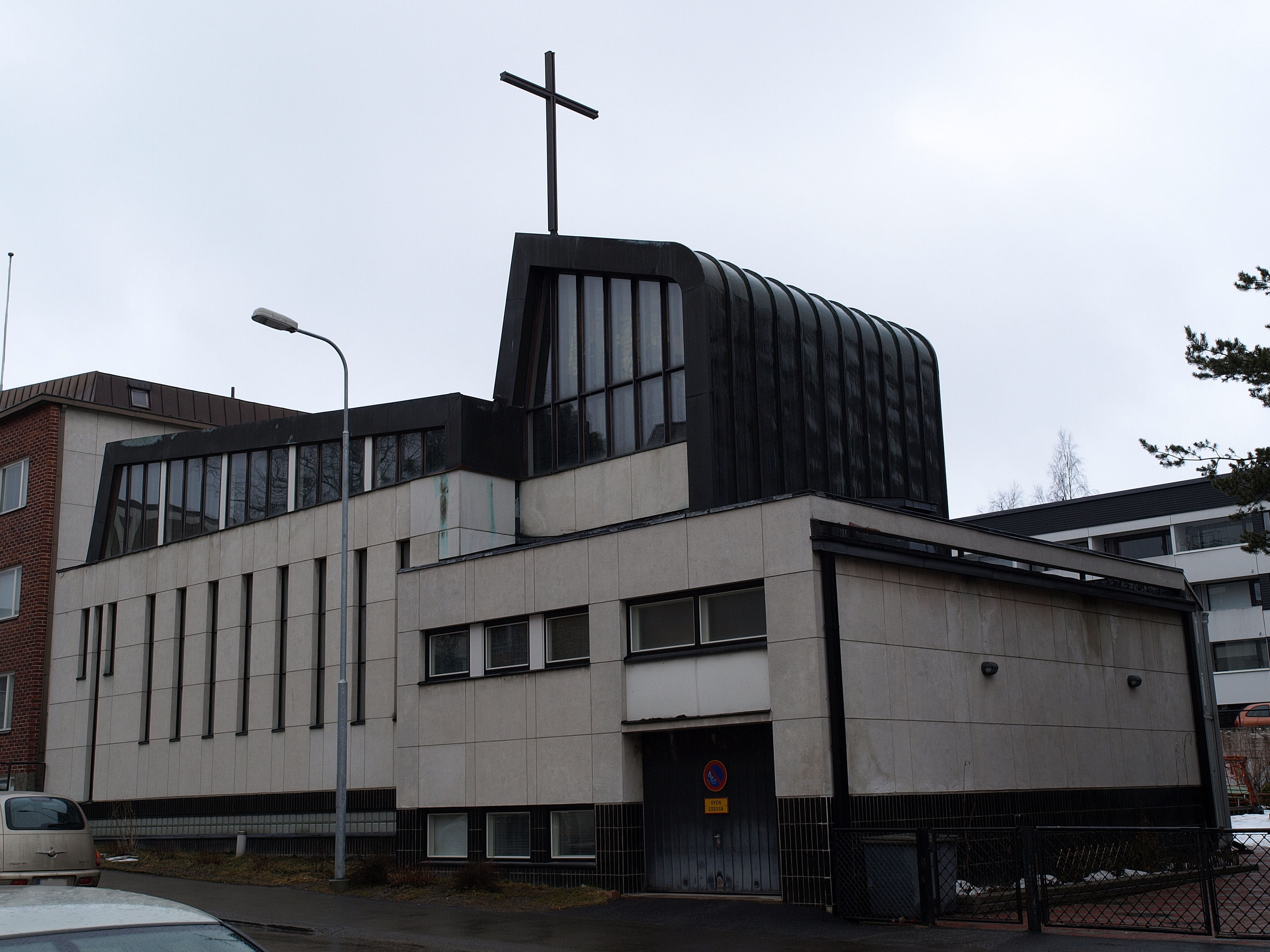
- St. Olaf's Church
- Location: Jyväskylä
- Country: Finland
- Denomination: Roman Catholic Church

St. Olaf's Church (Finnish: Pyhän Olavin kirkko) is a Catholic church in the Harju district of Jyväskylä, in Finland.

After World War II, the Catholic parishes of Karelia and Vyborg Terijoki were merged, with services held in Lahti. A more central location was sought, however, and so the community moved to a chapel in Jyväskylä on January 10, 1949. Outgrowing this space, a new church was commissioned in 1962. Designed by Olavi Kivimaa, it is an austere concrete structure with a covered facade.

The parish serves most Catholics in central and eastern Finland. In addition to the church, it sponsors a parish center, a Catholic school, a student residence, a rectory and apartments.

== See also ==
- Roman Catholicism in Finland
- St. Henry's Cathedral
