= Holy Family of Nazareth Church, Oulu =

Holy Family of Nazareth Church
- Catholic Church of Oulu
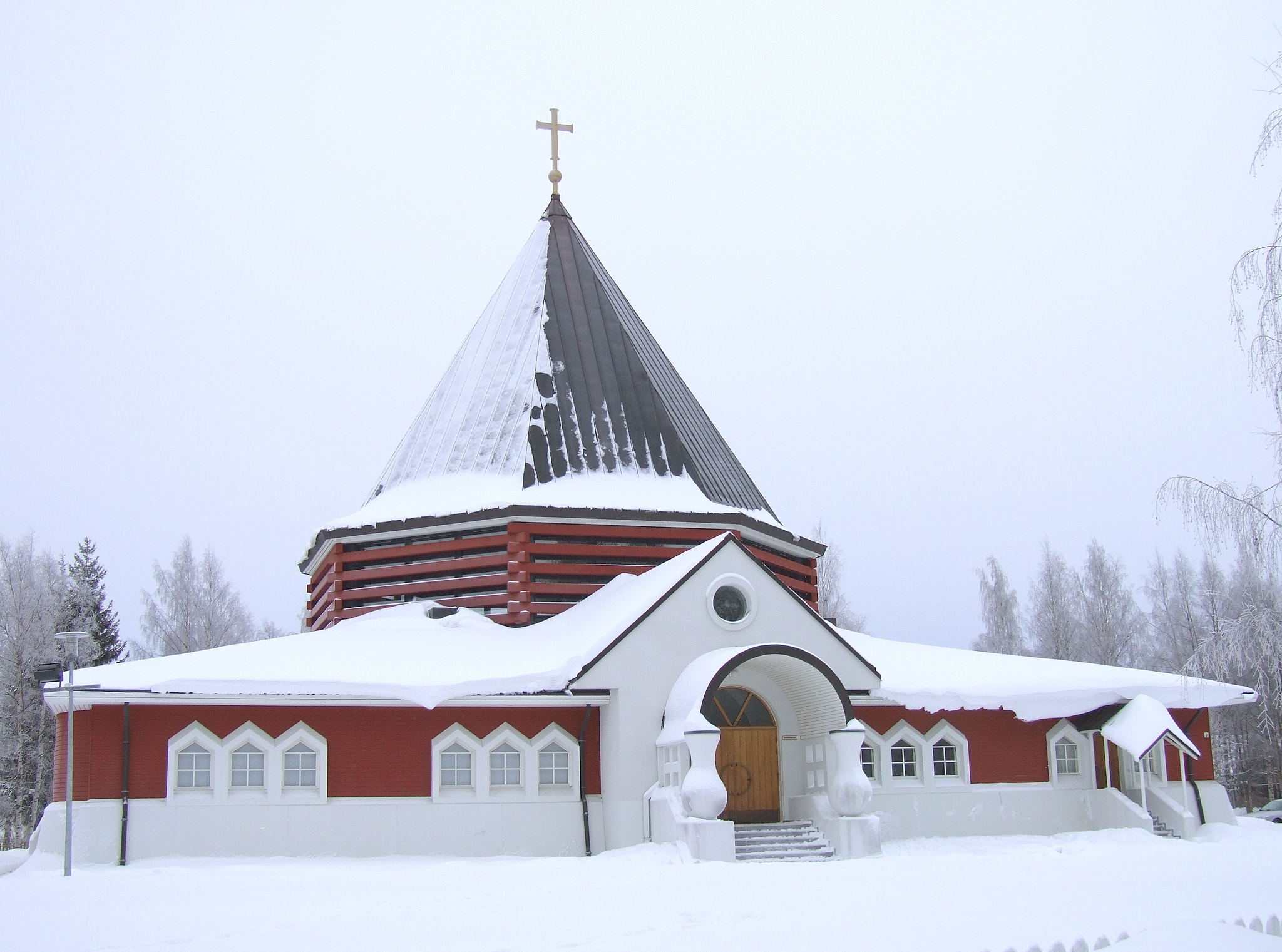
- Holy Family of Nazareth Church
- 65°2′41″N 025°27′20″E
- Location: Koskela, Oulu
- Country: Finland
- Denomination: Roman catholic
- Website: http://perhe.katolinen.fi/Index.english.html

History
- Status: Church

Architecture
- Functional status: Active
- Architect: Gabriel Geronzi
- Completed: 1991

Administration
- Diocese: Roman Catholic Diocese of Helsinki
- Parish: Parish of the Holy Family of Nazareth

The Holy Family of Nazareth Church (Finnish: Nasaretin pyhän perheen kirkko) is a Roman Catholic church in the Koskela district in Oulu.

The church building, designed by architect Gabriel Geronzi, was constructed in two phases. Pope John Paul II blessed the cornerstone of the church on his visit to Finland in 1989. The first phase of the church building was completed in 1991. The second phase was completed in 2000.

The parish of the Holy Family of Nazareth was established in 1992. It includes Northern Ostrobothnia and the Finnish Lapland and is the northernmost Catholic parish of Finland.

Operating in the parish since 1989, as of 2016 there are four neocatechumenal communities in the parish.
