= Gulielmus Cobben =

Dutch Catholic priest and bishop (1897-1985)

The Most Reverend Gulielmus Cobben
- Bishop of Helsinki
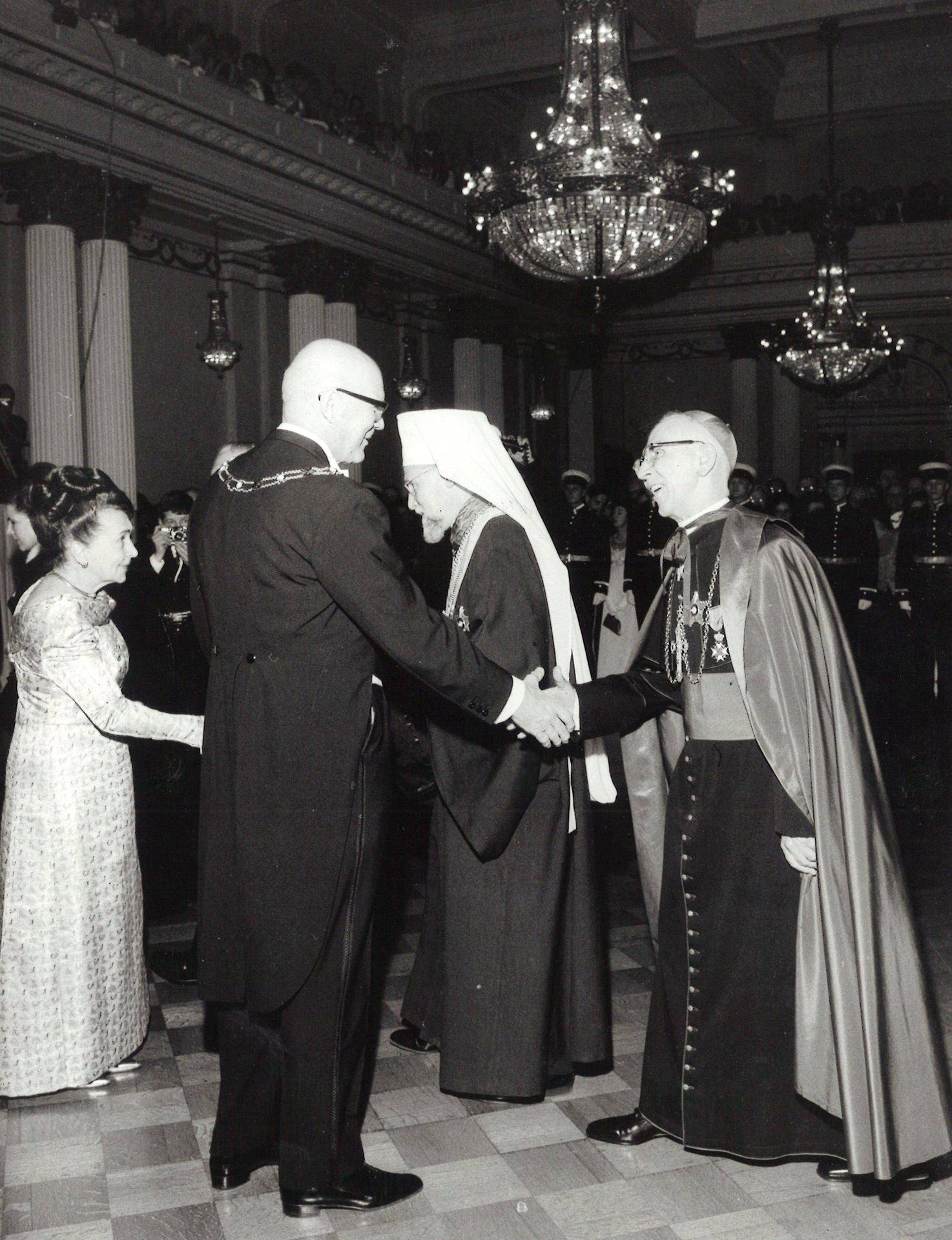
- Bishop Cobben (right) shaking hands with Finnish President Urho Kekkonen on Independence Day 1966
- Church: Roman Catholic Church
- Diocese: Roman Catholic Diocese of Helsinki
- In office: 1955–1967
- Successor: Paul Verschuren
- Other post: Titular Bishop of Tamagrista (1967–1976)
- Previous post: Apostolic Vicar of Finland (1933–1955)

Orders
- Ordination: April 19, 1924
- Consecration: March 19, 1934

Personal details
- Born: June 29, 1897 Sittard, Netherlands
- Died: January 27, 1985 (aged 87) Sittard, Netherlands
- Coat of arms

Gulielmus (Guillaume) Cobben (born Willem Petrus Bartholomaeus Cobben; June 29, 1897 – January 27, 1985) was a Dutch Catholic priest and bishop, who was the first bishop of the Roman Catholic Diocese of Helsinki.

Cobben was ordained in 1924. Before being consecrated bishop, he was the chaplain of the Catholic congregation of Terijoki (1924–1925) and Vyborg (1925–1926), and the vicar of the congregation of Turku (1926–1934). In 1933, he was appointed as the apostolic vicar of Finland, replacing Bishop Michael Buckx. He was consecrated as the titular bishop of Amathus in Palæstina in 1934. During his tenure as the apostolic vicar of Finland, the Diocese of Helsinki was established and replaced the apostolic vicariate of Finland in 1955. He was the first Bishop of Helsinki and resigned from the position in the year 1967. He was titular bishop of Tamagrista from 1967 to 1976.

Styles of Willem Cobben
- Reference style: The Most Reverend
- Spoken style: Your Excellency
