= Michael Buckx =

Dutch Catholic priest and bishop (1881-1946)

The Most Reverend Mikael Buckx
- Apostolic Vicar of Finland
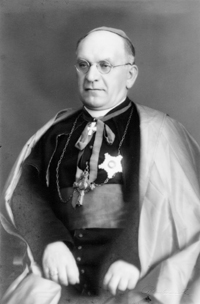
- Church: Roman Catholic Church
- In office: 1923 – 1933
- Successor: Gulielmus Cobben

Orders
- Ordination: June 9, 1906
- Consecration: August 15, 1923

Personal details
- Born: August 6, 1881 Born, Netherlands
- Died: September 22, 1946 (aged 65)

Johannes Michael Buckx (August 6, 1881 – September 22, 1946) was a Dutch Catholic priest and bishop, who was the first Roman Catholic bishop in Finland since the reformation.

Buckx was ordained a priest in 1906. He worked in the Roman Catholic congregation of Vyborg (part of the Grand Duchy of Finland at the time) from 1909 to 1911. In 1923, he was appointed the apostolic vicar of Finland and the titular bishop of Doliche. He was succeeded as the apostolic vicar of Finland by Gulielmus Cobben in 1933.

Styles of Michael Buckx
- Reference style: The Most Reverend
- Spoken style: Your Excellency
- Religious style: Monsignor
