= Arvid Kurck =

Bishop of Turku

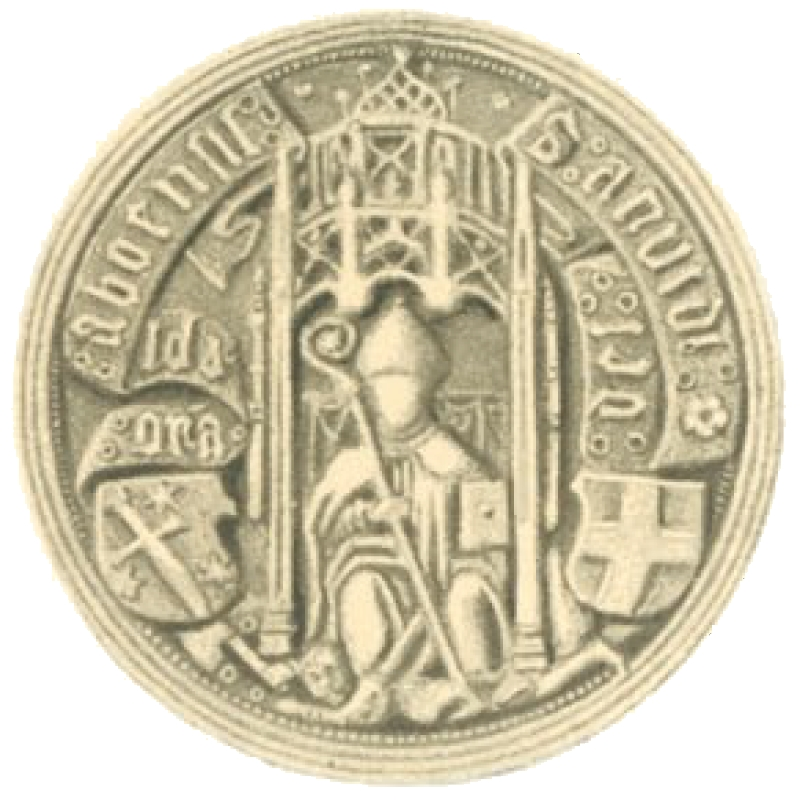
Arvid Kurck's seal

Arvid Kurck (also known as Arvid Kurki; 1464 in Vesilahti – 22 July 1522 in Öregrund) was the Roman Catholic bishop of Turku from 1510 to 1522. He was a member of the Finnish noble family Kurki of Laukko. Kurck is considered to be the last truly Catholic bishop of Finland before his successors started to hesitantly promote the Reformation.

Arvid Kurck studied at the University of Paris in 1480s. He was a supporter of Sten Sture the Younger who was against the re-establishment of Kalmar Union. In 1520 Kurck survived the Stockholm Bloodbath as he did not visit the coronation of Christian II. Two years later Kurck took part on the uprising against King Christian. As the rebellions were defeated, Kurck fled to Sweden and was drowned in a shipwreck near the town of Öregrund.

== See also ==
- List of bishops of Turku

Preceded by Johannes IV Olofsson	Bishop of Turku; 1510–1522	Succeeded by Ericus Svenonius
