= St. John's Church, Helsinki =

St. John's Church
- Nya Kyrkan
- Finnish: Johanneksenkirkko; Swedish: Johanneskyrkan
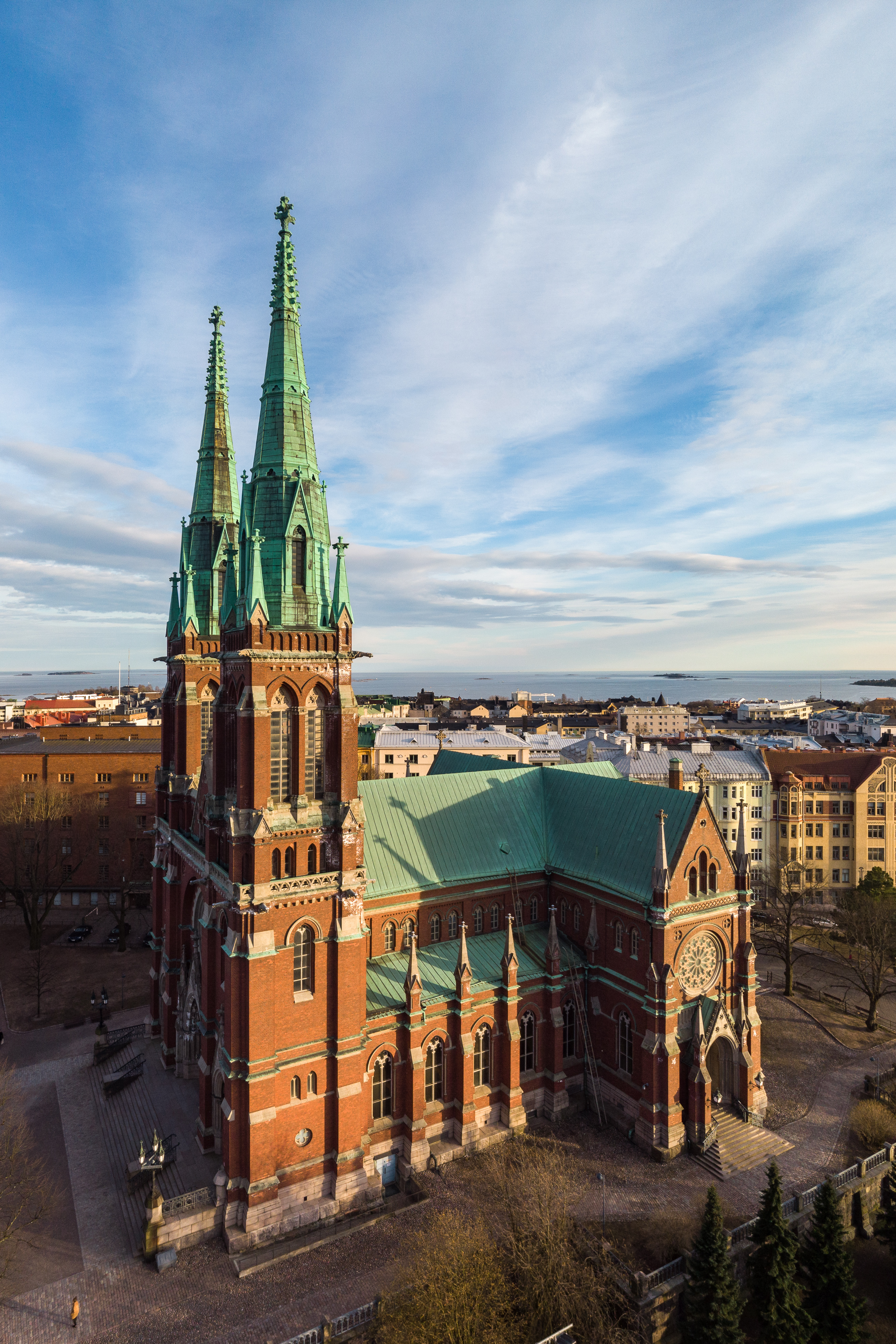
- St. John's Church
- 60°09′42.5″N 024°56′41.0″E
- Location: Helsinki
- Country: Finland
- Denomination: Lutheran
- Website: www.helsinginkirkot.fi/en/churches/st-johns-church

History
- Consecrated: 1891

Architecture
- Architect: Adolf Emil Melander
- Style: Gothic Revival
- Groundbreaking: 1888
- Completed: 1891

Specifications
- Capacity: 2,600

Administration
- Diocese: Helsinki

St. John's Church (Finnish: Johanneksenkirkko, Swedish: Johanneskyrkan) in Helsinki, Finland, is a Lutheran church designed by the Swedish architect Adolf Melander in the Gothic Revival style. It is the largest stone church in Finland by seating capacity.

== Description ==
Johannes (John) church stands on a hill that for many centuries had been a place for Midsummer bonfires (Midsummer is now also "John's Day", Juhannus in Finnish).

Situated in the Ullanlinna district of Helsinki, the church was built between 1888 and 1891, the third Lutheran church in Helsinki, and still the biggest. The twin towers are 74 metres (243 ft) in height, and the church seats 2,600 people and has excellent acoustics, and it is therefore used for big concerts and events as well as services. The altarpiece shows Paul's conversion and the painting, called A Divine Revelation, is by Eero Järnefelt, brother-in-law to Jean Sibelius.

In August 2022 a six-month renovation of the church was completed, in which the gargoyles of the church were repaired and renewed due to their poor condition; Helsinki's raw sea air and weather fluctuations on both sides of zero had damaged the condition of the concrete decorations and it was feared that they would crumble and fall in time.

=== Organ ===
The organ was built in 1891 by German company Walcker of Ludwigsburg, with a pneumatic mechanism. At the time it was the largest in Finland. In 1921, composer Oskar Merikanto, the first church organist, expanded the organ. In 2004 and 2005, the organ was renovated by German organ builder Christian Scheffler Orgelwerkstatt; it now has 66 stops and 4,036 pipes.

In 2018 an English-style shell organ, by Urkurakentamo Veikko Virtanen Oy from Espoo, was installed. It has nine voices and a movable soundboard.

== Gallery ==
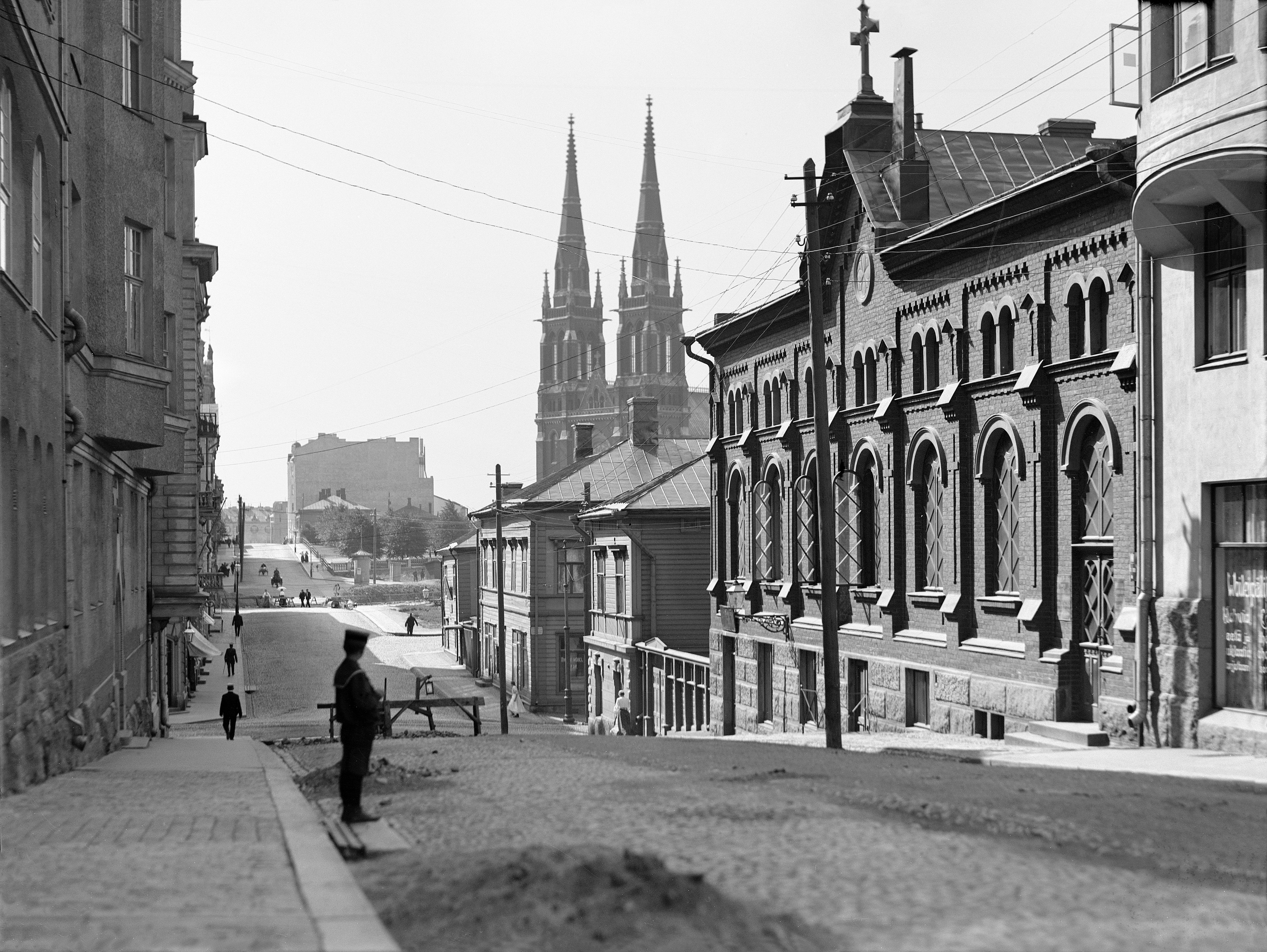
Korkeavuorenkatu and St. John's Church in 1908

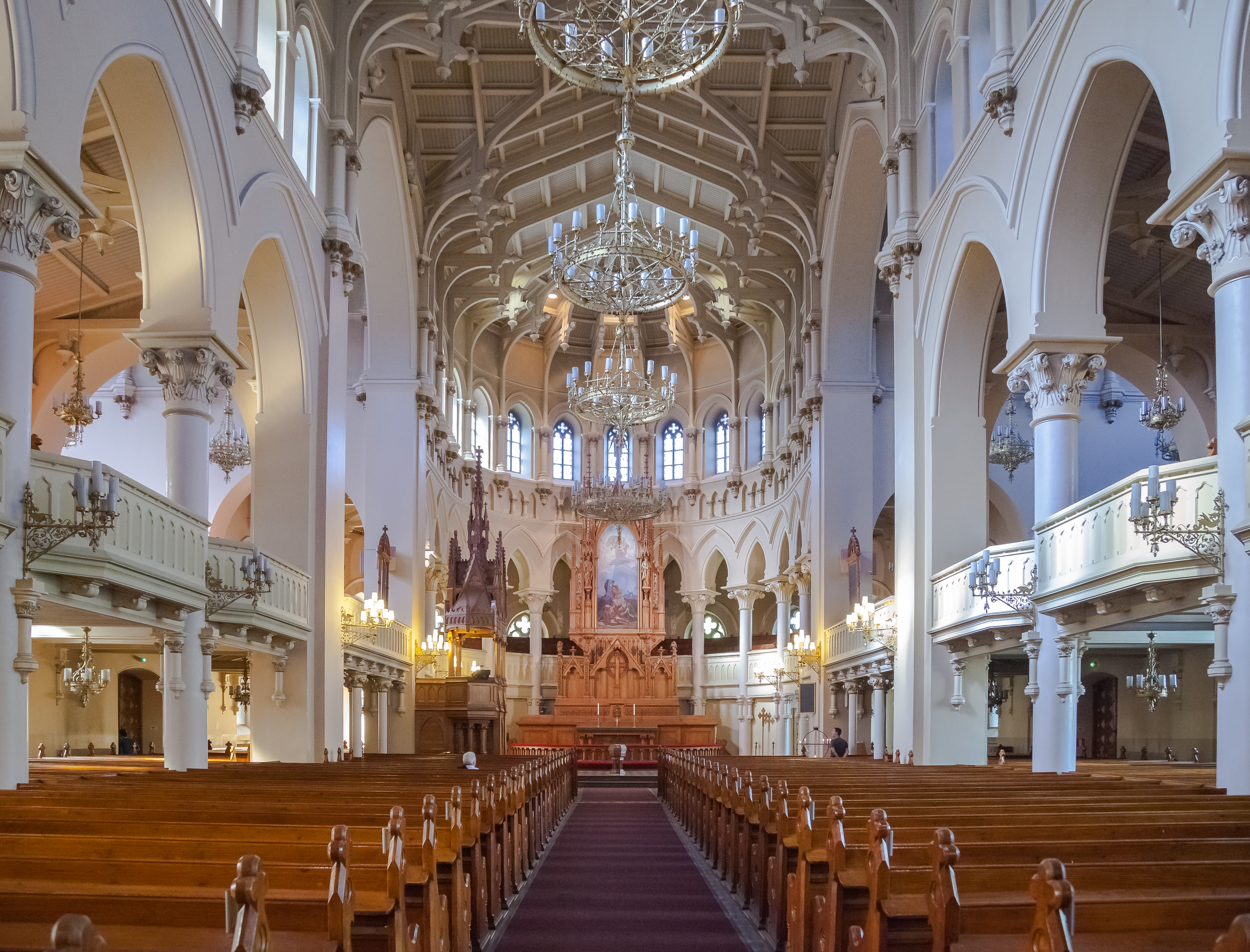
Interior of the church in 2012

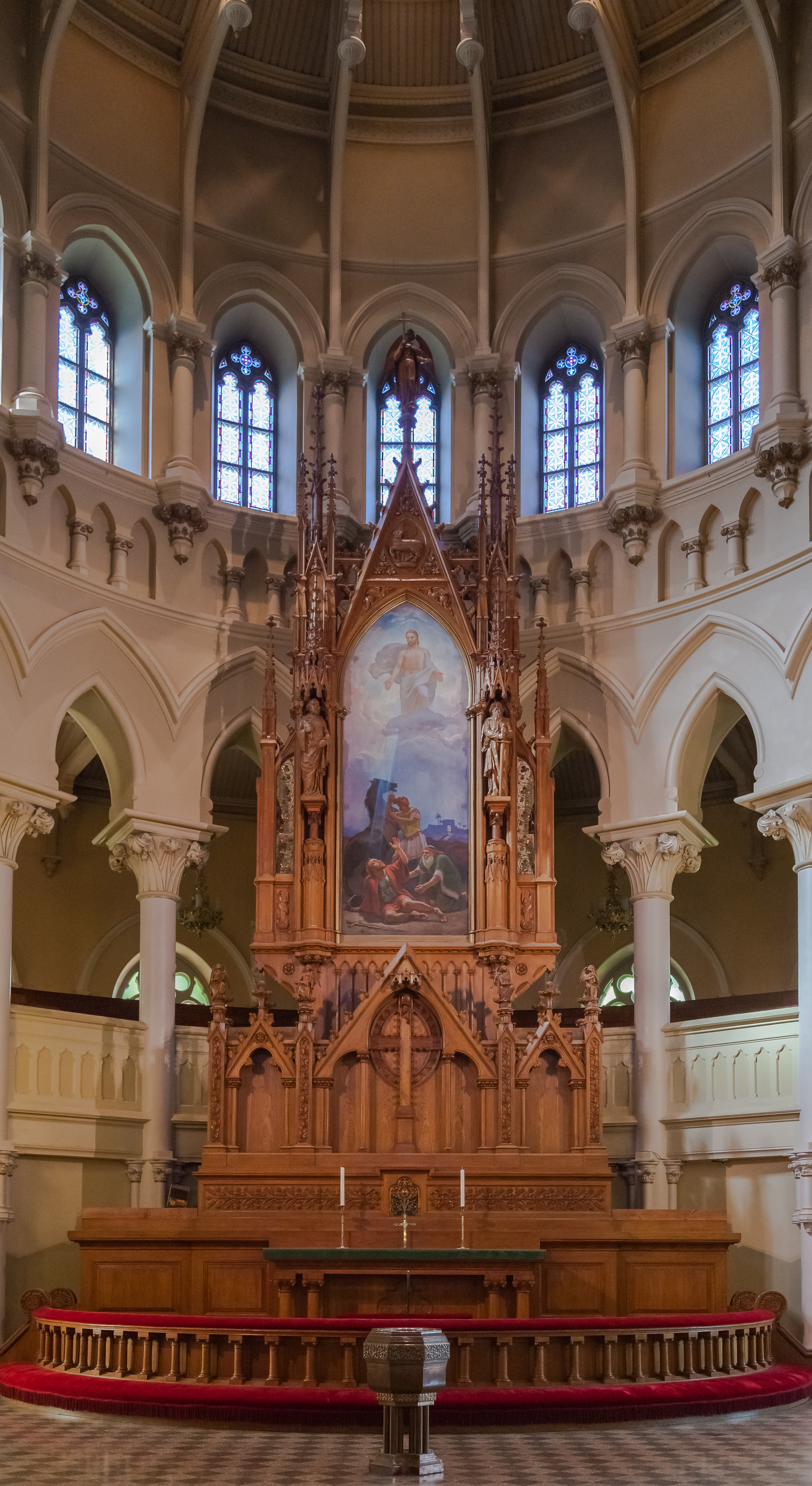
Altar

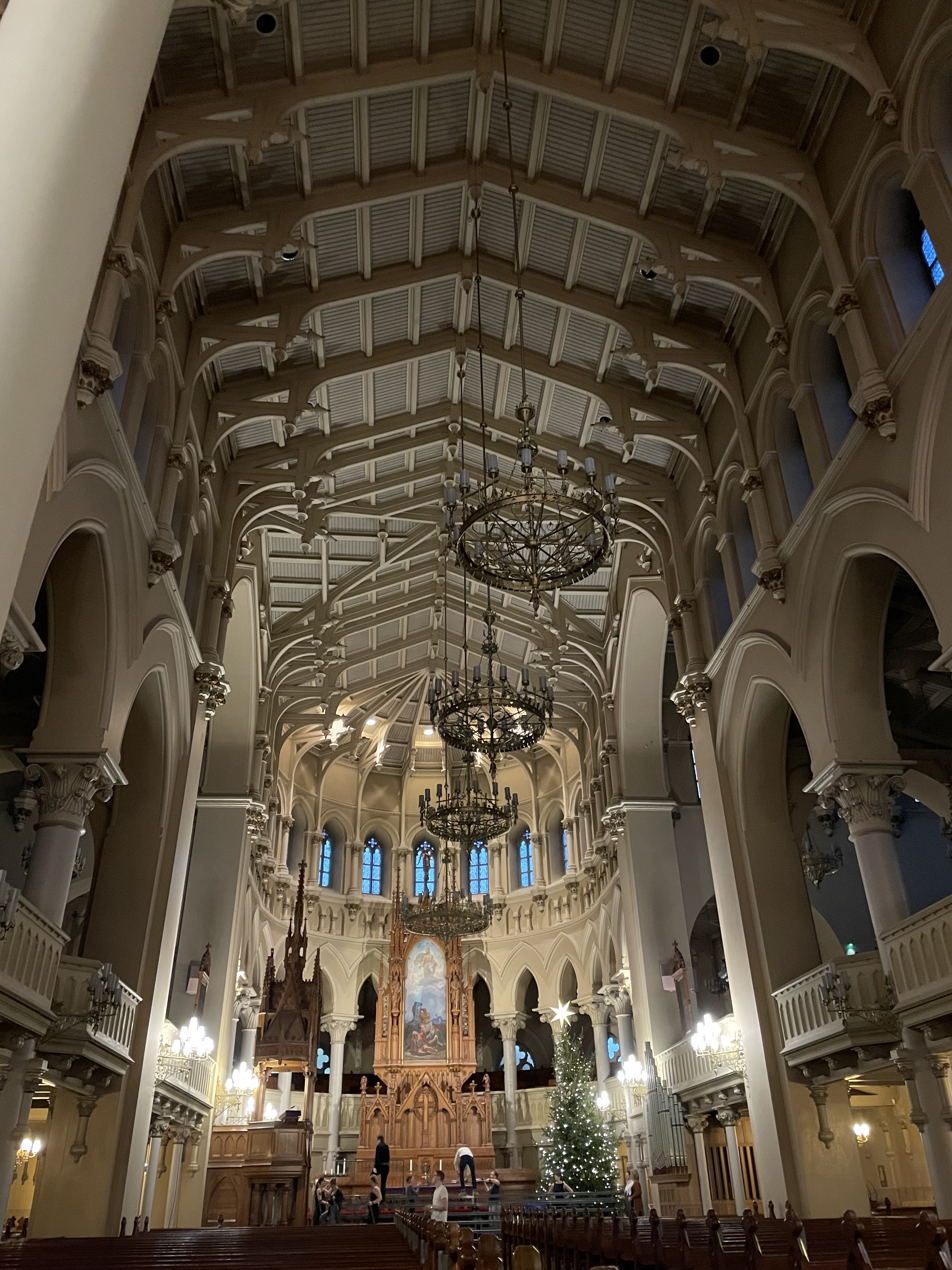
Interior and altar of the church in 2024

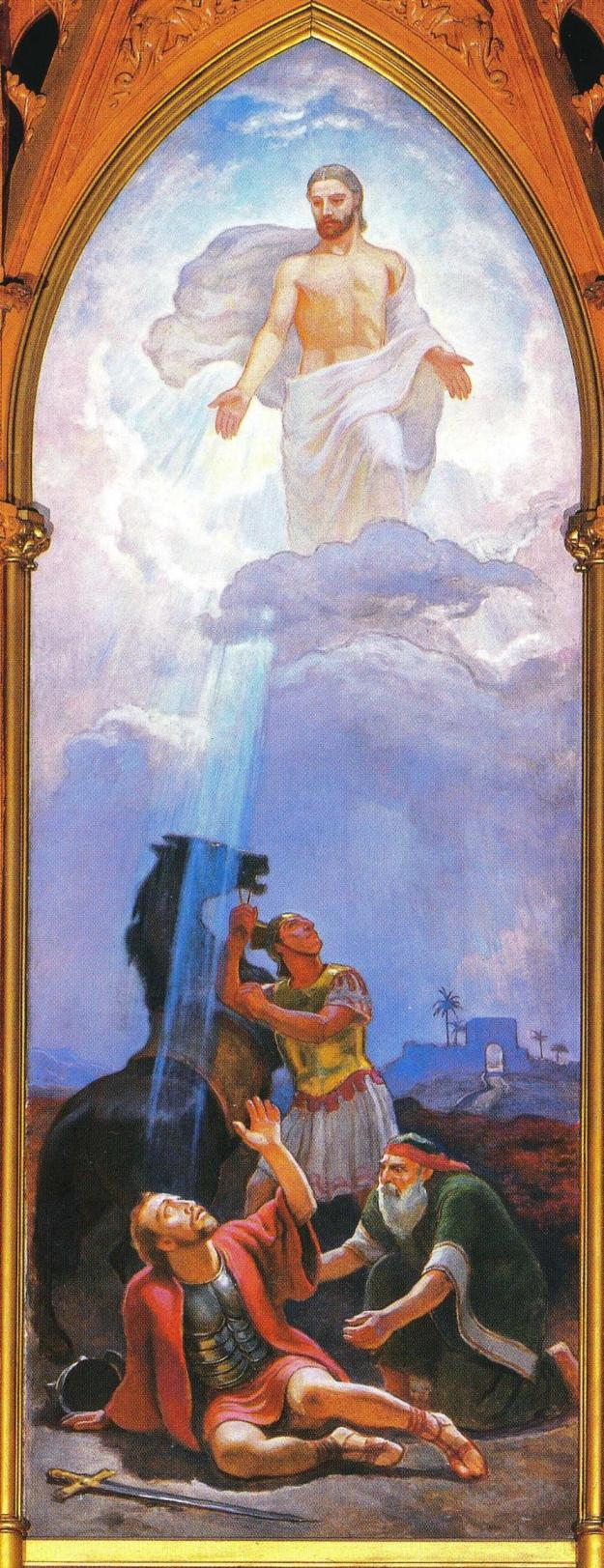
Conversion of Paul the Apostle by Eero Järnefelt, 1932

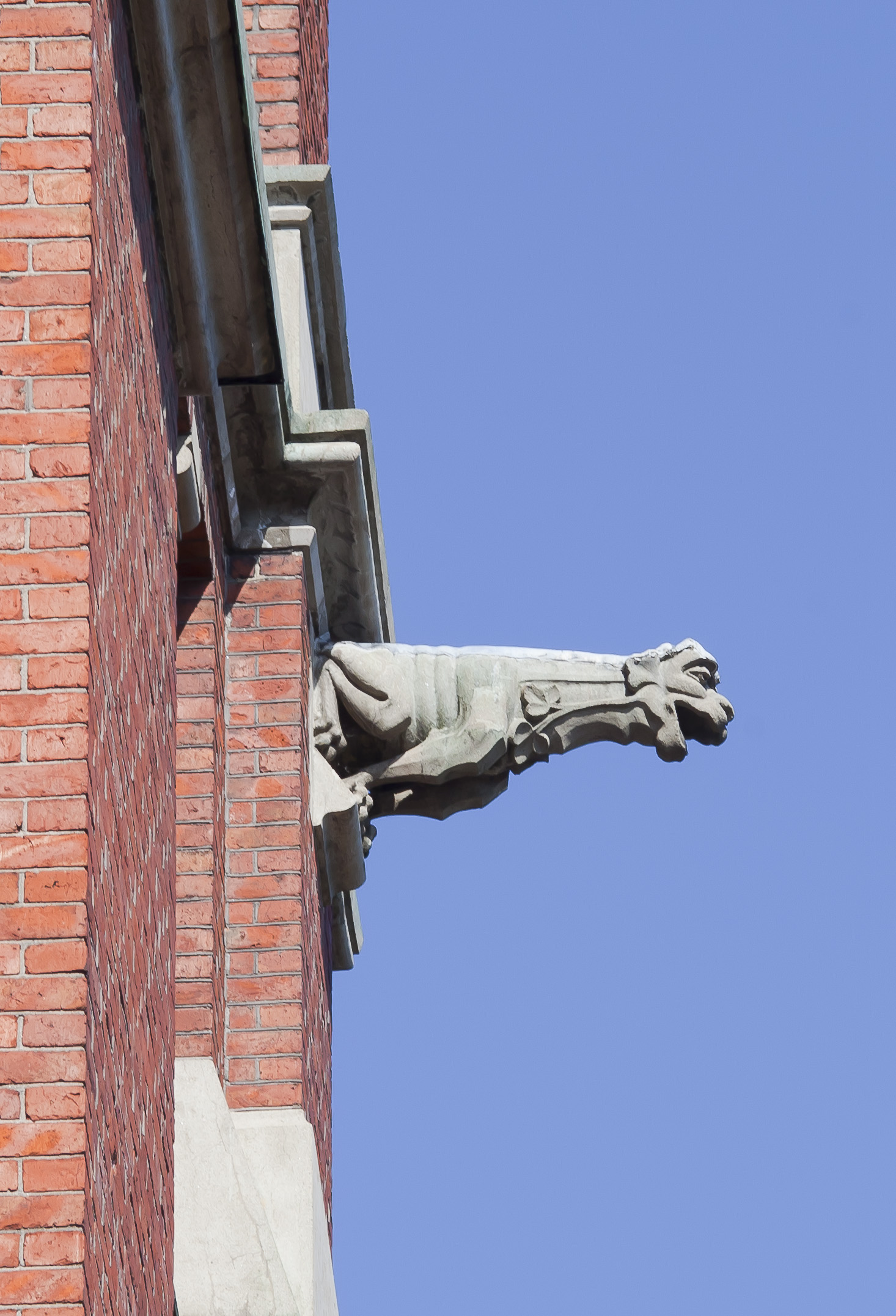
Gargoyle at the St. John's Church

== See also ==
- Evangelical Lutheran Church of Finland
