= St. Henry's Cathedral =

St Henry's Cathedral
- Pyhän Henrikin katedraali Sankt Henriks katedral
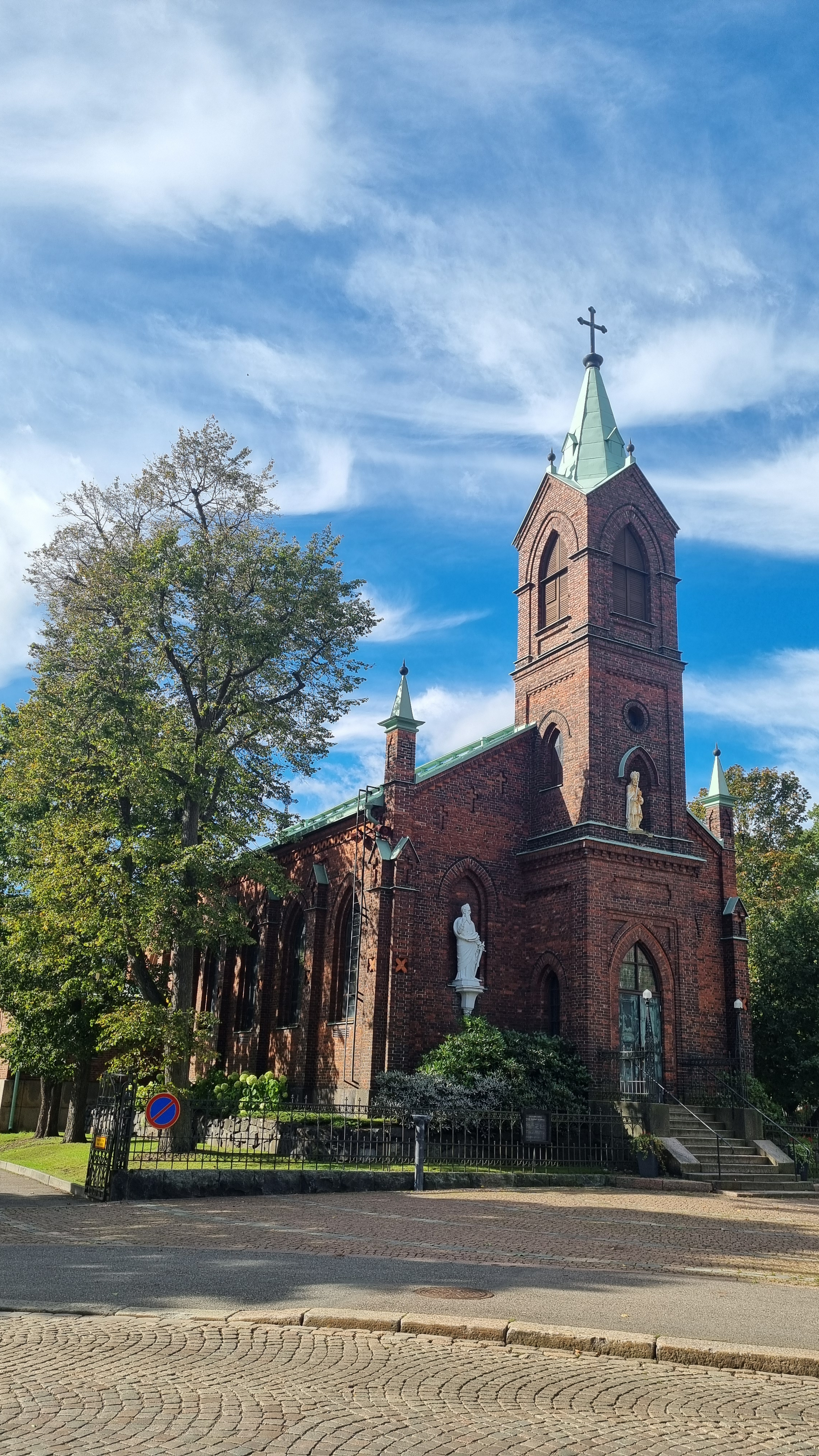
- St. Henry's Cathedral
- St Henry's Cathedral
- 60°09′33″N 24°57′16″E
- Location: Ullanlinna, Helsinki
- Country: Finland
- Denomination: Roman Catholic
- Website: henrik.katolinen.fi

History
- Status: Active
- Dedication: St Henry
- Consecrated: 1904

Architecture
- Functional status: Cathedral
- Architectural type: Gothic Revival
- Completed: 1860

Administration
- Diocese: Helsinki

Clergy
- Bishop: Raimo Goyarrola

St. Henry's Cathedral is a Catholic cathedral in Helsinki, Finland, dedicated in honor of Bishop Henrik, a 12th-century Bishop of Turku. It is the cathedral church of the Diocese of Helsinki. In terms of membership, the cathedral is the largest in Finland, with approximately 5,000 members.

The cathedral was constructed between 1858 and 1860, primarily to serve Russian Catholics in the army, as well as Catholic merchants. Although it was finished in 1860, it was not consecrated until 1904. It became the cathedral church of Helsinki in 1955, when the diocese was erected.

The church was designed by architect Ernst Lohrmann. The architecture of the church is Gothic Revival. Statues of Bishop Henrik, Saint Peter and Saint Paul decorate the exterior.

== Gallery ==
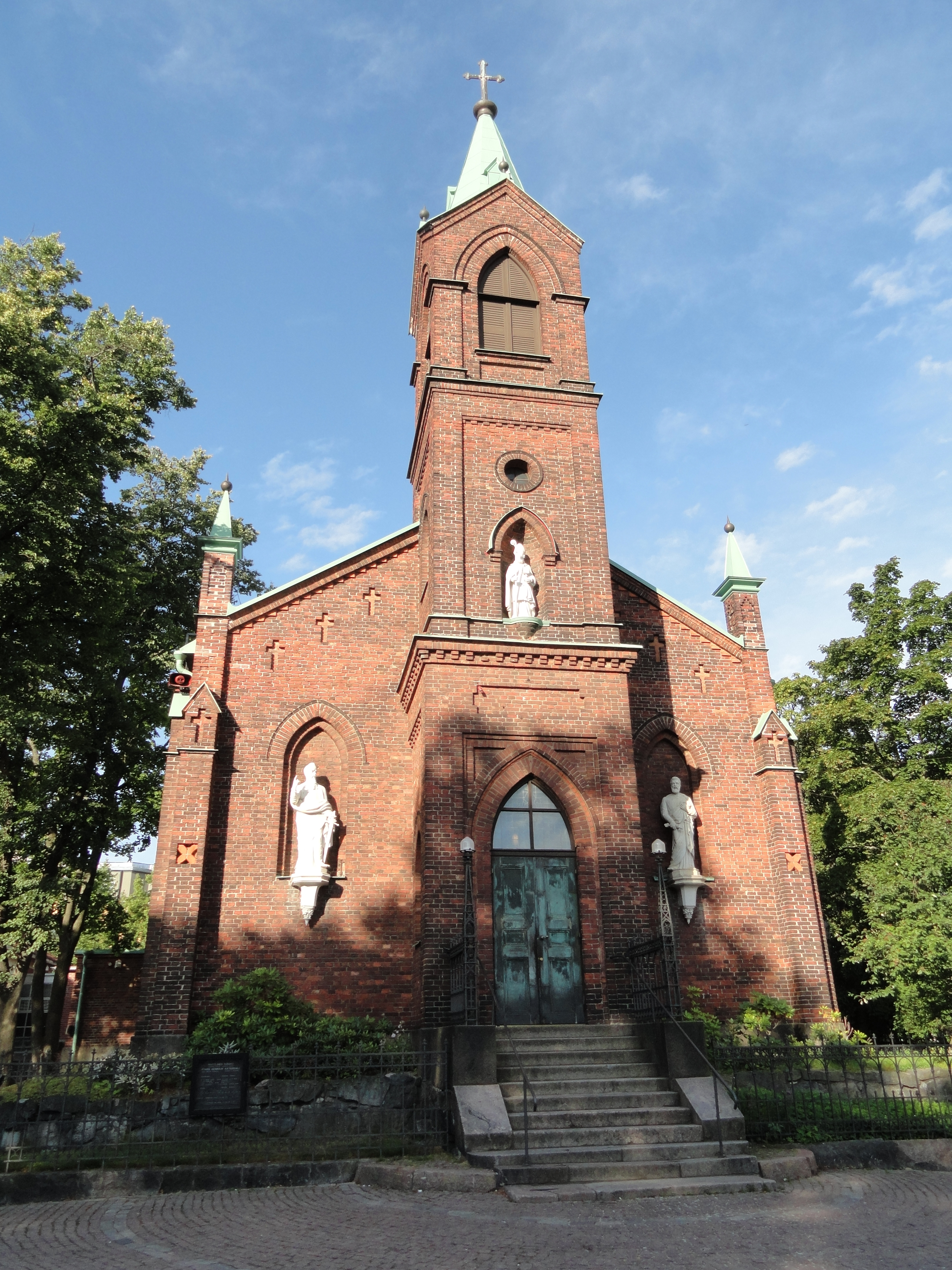
Front

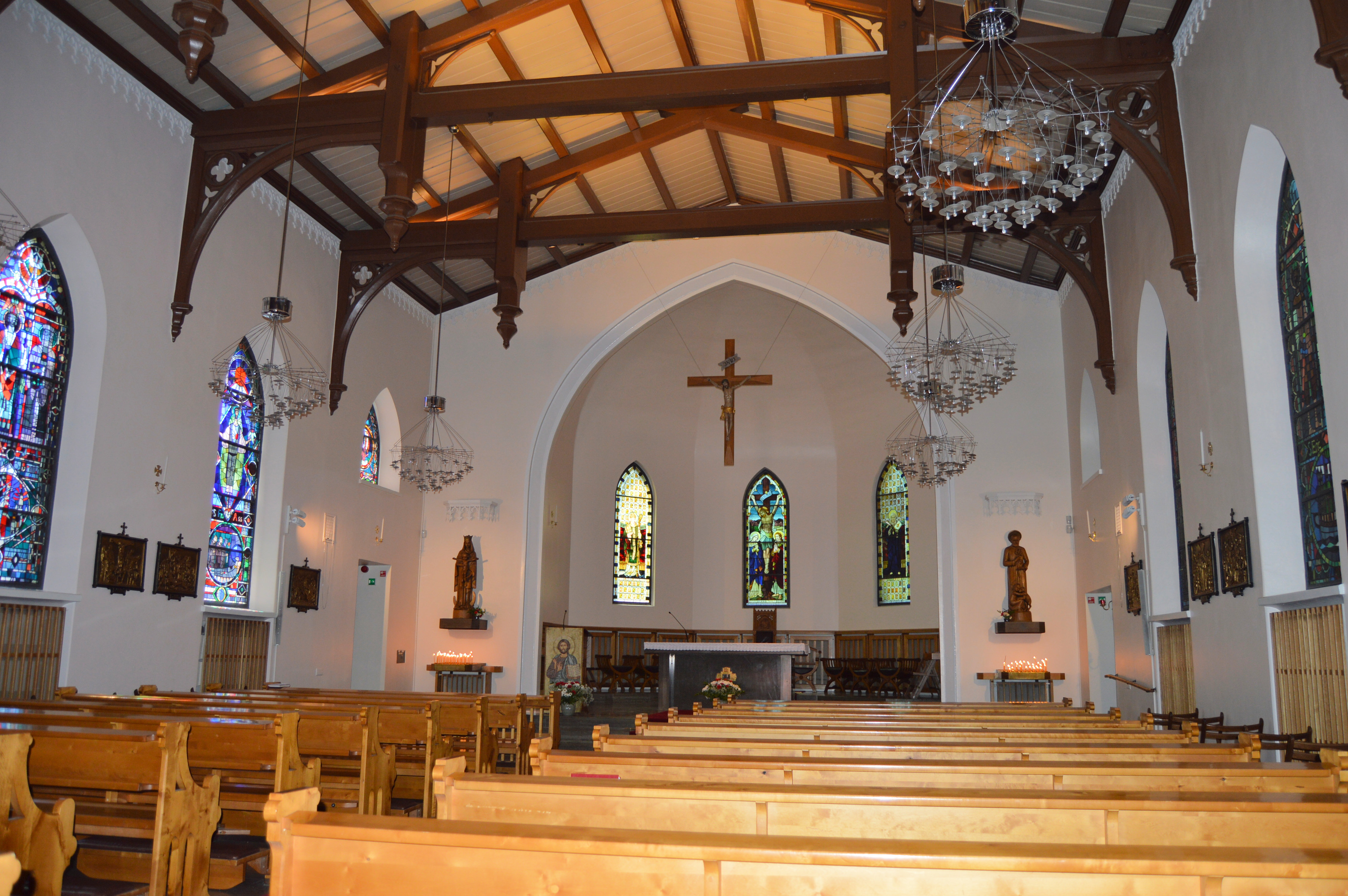
Inside

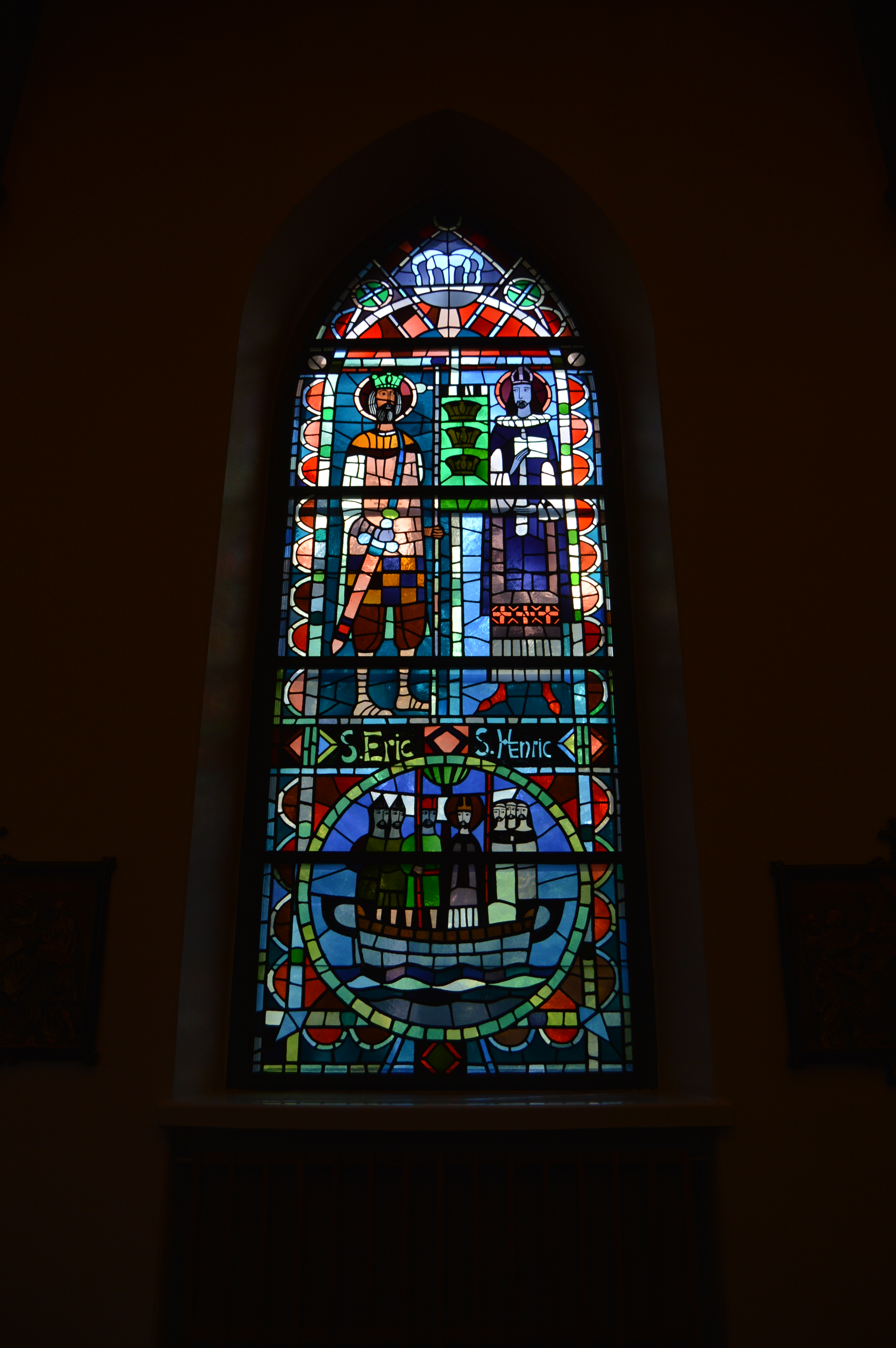
Stained glass window

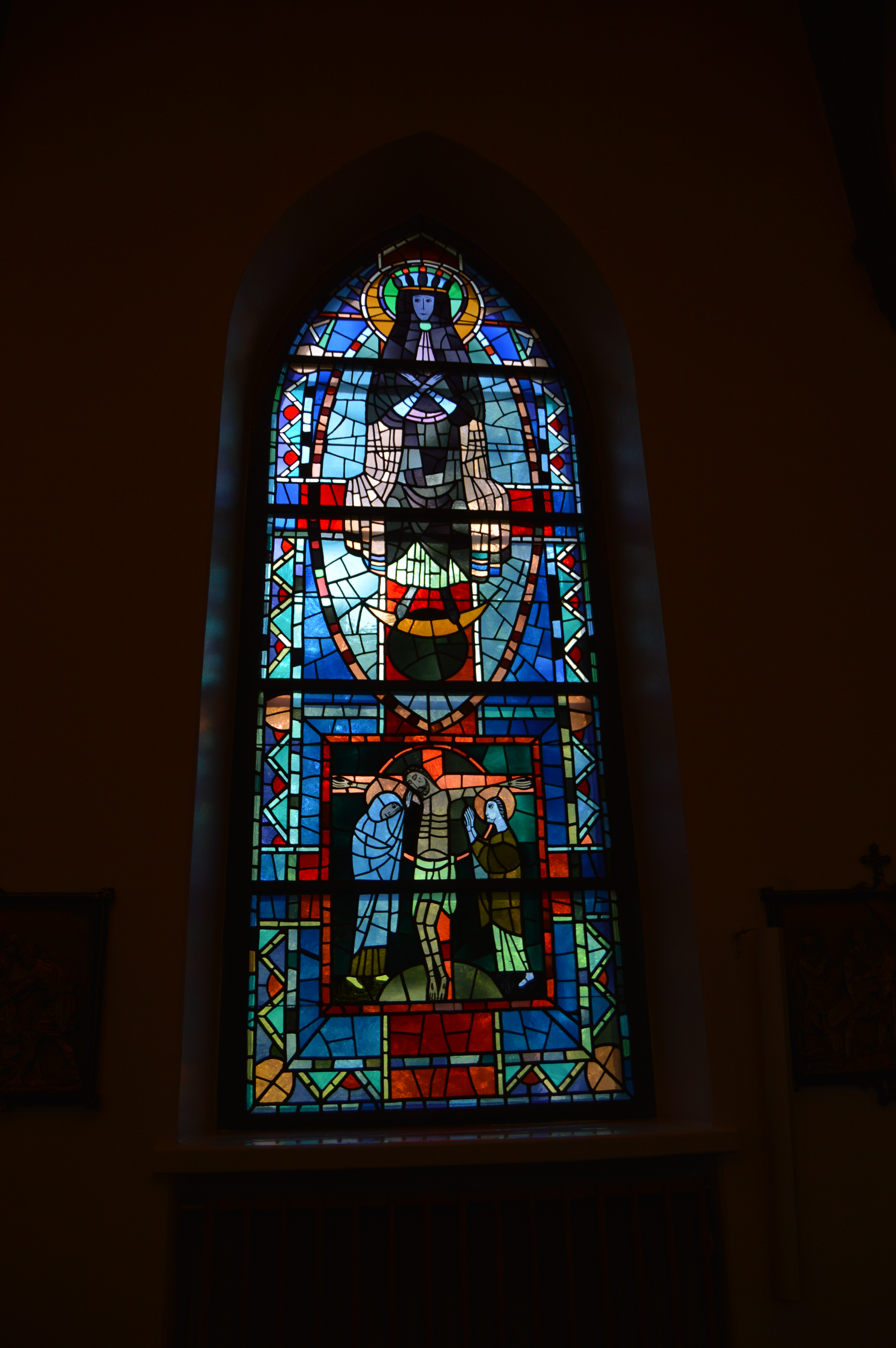
Stained glass window

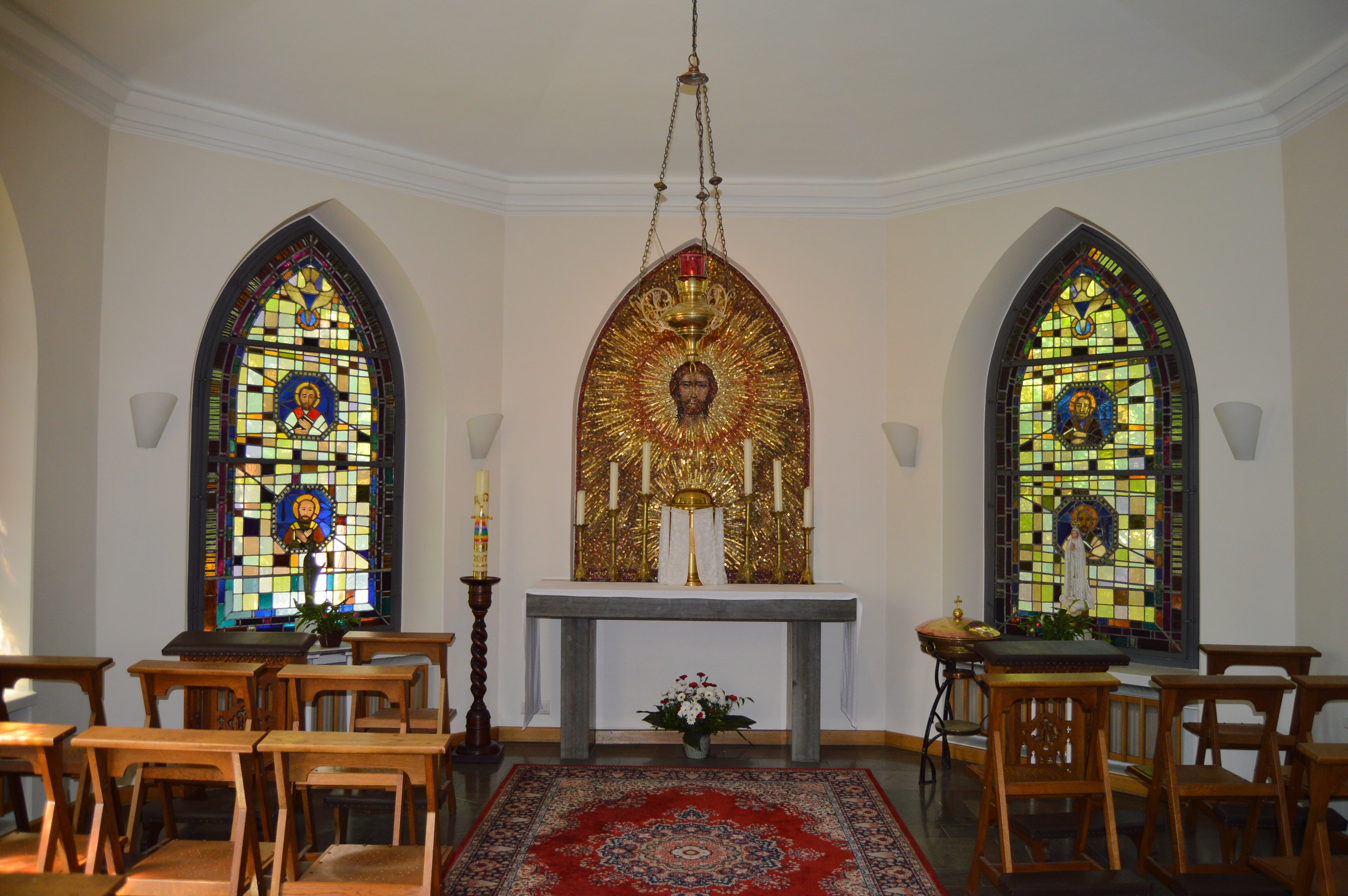
Sacrament chapel

== See also ==
- Catholic Church in Finland
- Catholic Diocese of Helsinki
- St. Mary's Church, Helsinki
