= Roman Catholic Diocese of Åbo =

Pre-Reformation Catholic jurisdiction in Finland

The Diocese of Åbo was the medieval, pre-Reformation Catholic predecessor of the later Archdiocese of Turku, an Evangelical Lutheran Church of Finland jurisdiction.

== History ==
- Established circa 1150? as Diocese of Åbo / Turku / Abœn(sis) (Latin adjective), on Finnish territory split off from the Swedish then Diocese of Uppsala (later Metropolitan)
- Suppressed on 1522.07.22, without direct Catholic successor

It was probably founded in the 12th century, but the Bishop of Finland is first mentioned only in 1209. Diocese seems to have been independent of secular powers until the so-called Second Swedish Crusade in 1249. The diocese was renamed as the Diocese of Turku by 1259 at the latest, by which time it had been assimilated to the set of Swedish dioceses.

The see was located in Nousiainen by 1234, when Bishop Thomas signed a letter there. The bishop had received papal approval for the transfer of the see in 1229, but it is not known if the transfer actually took place. If the see had been located somewhere else before, the location is unknown. The see was later moved to Koroinen close to the current cathedral of Turku, probably soon after the Swedish conquest in 1249.

== Episcopal ordinaries ==
Suffragan Bishops of Åbo

Bishops of Finland are usually included in the list of Bishops of Turku.

- Saint Henry = Henrik (born England) (1150? – 1152), next Bishop of Uppsala (Sweden) (1152 – death 1156.01.20)
- Rodulff (? – death 1178?)
- Folkvin (? – ?)
- Tuomas, Dominican Order (O.P.) (1209.10.30 – death 1248)
- Bero (1249 – death 1253)
- Ragvald (? – death 1266)
- Ragvald (? – death 1266)
- Johan, O.P. (1286/1290-07-08), next Metropolitan Archbishop of Uppsala (Sweden) (1290-07-08/1291-09-08)

== See also ==
- List of Catholic dioceses in Finland
- Bishop of Turku
- List of Bishops of Turku
- Second Swedish Crusade

== Sources ==
- GCatholic
