= Roman Catholic Diocese of Leal =

Roman Catholic diocese in Livonia

Diocese of Leal or Bishopric of Estonia was the name of the main Latin diocese in Estonia during the early Catholic missionary phase.

== History ==
It was established in 1211, with episcopal see in Leal (today Lihula). The two known bishops were Fulco, Theoderich and Hermann of Dorpat who was bishop from 1222-1224.

It was suppressed in 1235, to establish on its territory the Roman Catholic Diocese of Dorpat (Tartu), which was itself suppressed in 1558, without succession.

== Sources ==
- GigaCatholic
