= Thomas (bishop of Finland) =

First known bishop of Finland (died 1248)

- Bishop of Finland
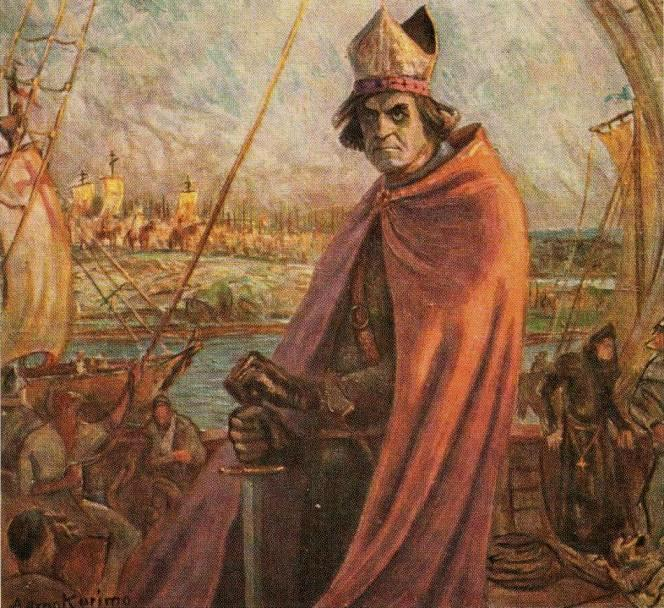
- Bishop Thomas on the Neva River (1930) by Aarno Karimo
- Church: Catholic
- Diocese: Finland
- See: presumably Nousiainen
- In office: 1234? – 1245
- Predecessor: Unknown
- Successor: Bero (Björn)

Personal details
- Born: Unknown
- Died: 1248 Visby, Gotland

Thomas (Finnish: Tuomas; died in 1248) was the third bishop of Finland, and is the first known one. Little is known of his activities. After admitting to having committed several crimes, he resigned in 1245. He died in Visby three years later. He is sometimes associated with an unnamed bishop who was sent letters from Pope Gregory IX in 1229.

== Biography ==
The only reference to Bishop Thomas during his episcopate in Finland is a letter signed by him in Nousiainen in 1234, which granted certain lands around the parish to his chaplain Wilhelm. The lands may be related to the papal permission from Pope Gregory IX in early 1229 that authorized the church to take over all non-Christian places of worship in Finland. The letter is the oldest surviving letter written in Finland.

No further information on the bishop's activities has survived before he was granted resignation by Pope Innocent IV on 21 February 1245. According to the pope, Thomas had admitted committing several felonies, such as torturing a man to death, and forging a papal letter. Church representatives to oversee the resignation were the archbishop of Uppsala and the Dominican prior of the Dacian province. Thomas donated his books to the newly established Dominican convent in Sigtuna and went on to live his last years in the Dominican convent in Visby, Gotland. He died there in 1248, shortly before the Second Swedish Crusade.

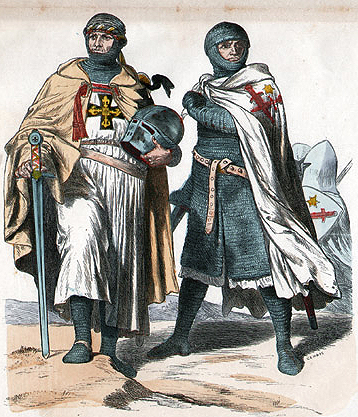
Finland was briefly under the same papal legate as the Teutonic knights.

During Thomas' episcopate, Finland is listed among the lands under the papal legate in the Baltic region, originally the Bishop of Zemgale, Baldwin, and then William of Modena, first on 28 January 1232 and last on 15 July 1244. This was a radical realignment of the bishopric's position because the pope had used Swedish bishops to supervise the Finnish church as evident from papal letters from 1171 (or 1172), 1221 and 1229. On 24 November 1232, the pope asked the Livonian Brothers of the Sword to provide forces for the unnamed bishop of Finland to defend the country against Novgorodian attacks.

After Thomas had resigned in 1245, there was no immediate successor to him. The diocese was overseen by William at least until 5 June 1248. Finland is not listed among the Swedish dioceses in surviving documents from 1241 and 1248, but appears among them in 1253.

Thomas is the first known Bishop of Finland, but it is certain that he was not the first bishop overall. An unnamed bishop of Finland is mentioned dead in a letter by Pope Innocent III in 1209. The 15th-century Chronicon episcoporum finlandensium by Bishop Paulus Juusten names bishops Henry, Rodulff and Folquinus before him, but no other sources mention them.

== Speculations ==
Being the first historical figure of importance in Finland, historians have tried to attribute more significance to Thomas than what is evident from the existing sources.

=== Unknown bishop in the 1220s ===
Most commonly, Thomas is speculated to have been the unnamed Bishop of Finland to whom Pope Gregory IX replied in January 1229 with several letters of great importance to the church, in the aftermath of major Finnish losses in the battle against the Republic of Novgorod. Church representatives ordered by the Pope to assist the unnamed bishop were the Bishop of Linköping and the Cistercian abbot in Gotland.

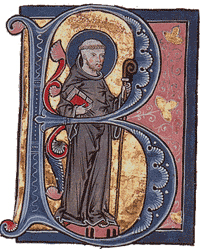
Cistercians dominated northern missionary work until the early 1230s.

Thomas' identification with the bishop remains doubtful. A surviving letter by Pope Gregory IX directly to the chaplain of Nousiainen on 20 October 1232 makes the Finnish see appear vacant. The letter handled the same land dispute that Thomas himself addressed two years later. In some copies of the letter, the bishop of Finland is referred to as "N.", while not directly saying whether he was still in office or not.

A papal letter to an unknown bishop of Finland was sent in 1221.

=== Uprising in Tavastia ===
Violent anti-church clashes in Tavastia, central Finland, mentioned in a letter by Pope Gregorius IX in 1237, have been attributed to Thomas' harsh methods of Christianization, but without direct evidence for that conjecture. The letter, addressed to the archbishop of Uppsala, does not mention the bishop or diocese of Finland in any way. Information about the uprising originated from the temporarily sidelined archbishop, who seems to have used the occasion to remind the pope about Uppsala's earlier contributions to the missionary work in the north. The pope clearly had not known where Tavastia exactly was, and eloquently urged the archbishop to send in a crusade.

The Livonian Brothers of the Sword had been all but annihilated in the Battle of Saule in 1236. Even if there is no other evidence of their presence in Finland than the earlier papal letter from 1232, both the archbishop and the Tavastians seem to have been on the move right after their demise. There also had been a revolt against the Germans in Estonia in 1236.

Based on the letter, some historians have tried to date the so-called Second Swedish Crusade to 1238 or 1239, listing it as Thomas' accomplishments as well.

=== Battle of the Neva ===
Thomas is speculated to have been one of the driving forces behind the Battle of the Neva, a disputed Swedish-Novgorodian conflict that took place in 1240. The speculation is based on the 14th-century Novgorod First Chronicle mention of Finns and Tavastians fighting on the Swedish side, which according to some historians would have been organized by the bishop. However, as the Chronicle also lists the very unlikely Norwegians as allies, the information is regarded as mid-14th century propaganda, depicting Sweden as being in control of Norway, Finland and Tavastia.

== See also ==
- Diocese of Finland
- Bishop Henry
- List of bishops of Turku
