= List of Catholic dioceses in Finland =

The Catholic church in Finland (where the state church is Lutheran) and its insular dependency has a tiny Latin hierarchy, comprising no ecclesiastical province nor belonging to any (all sees being exempt, i.e. directly subject to the Holy See), and has no national episcopal conference, but the Finnish episcopate participates in the Episcopal conference of Scandinavia.

The only proper see is Latin: a full bishopric in the national capital: Diocese of Helsinki.

The Eastern Catholics are pastorally served by a transnational apostolic exarchate from Germany. There are no pre-diocesan or other Latin exempt jurisdictions.

There formally is also an Apostolic Nunciature to Finland, as papal embassy-level diplomatic representation, but it is vested in the Apostolic Nunciature to Sweden (in Djursholm), as are the nunciatures to Denmark, Norway and Iceland, covering the Nordic countries.

== Current jurisdictions ==
=== Latin jurisdictions ===
- Diocese of Helsinki, which also covers Åland

=== Eastern Catholic jurisdiction ===
Ukrainian Catholic Church (Byzantine rite in Ukrainian language)

- Ukrainian Catholic Apostolic Exarchate in Germany and Scandinavia, also covering Germany (with the see in Münich), Denmark, Norway and Sweden

== Defunct jurisdictions ==
No titular sees

=== Pre-Reformation Latin ===
- Diocese of Åbo (Turku)

=== Post-Reformation ===
Only Apostolic Vicariate of Finland, the direct precursors of the current Latin see.

== See also ==
- List of Catholic dioceses (structured view)

== Sources and external links ==
- GCatholic - data for all sections
- Catholic-hierarchy.org - embryonic
