= Mynäjärvi =

Lake of Pöytyä, Finland

- Location within Finland

- Location: Yläne and Mynämäki
- Coordinates: 60°45′34″N 22°21′36″E
- Basin countries: Finland
- Surface area: 26 ha (64 acres)

Mynäjärvi is a lake. It is located in the area of Pöytyä and Mynämäki municipalities in the Kurjenrahka National Park in Finland. Mynäjärvi is a source of the Mynäjoki (Mynä River).
