= Bero (bishop of Finland) =

Bishop of Finland

- Bishop of Finland
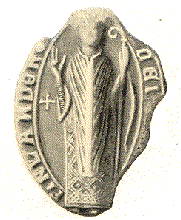
- Seal of Bishop Bero of Finland from 1253.
- Church: Roman Catholic
- See: Koroinen (Turku)
- In office: 1248–1258
- Predecessor: Thomas
- Successor: Ragvald

Personal details
- Born: Unknown; Västergötland

Bero (Björn) was the first certainly Swedish Bishop of Finland in the mid-13th century. His historicity is not questioned.

== Background ==
According to Paulus Juusten's chronicle Chronicon episcoporum Finlandensium from the mid-16th century, Bero was in office during 1248-58. He is also mentioned in another mid-15th century chronicle of the same name. Presumably from Västergötland, Bero was said to have given "Finns' tax to the king". It is assumed, that he was installed as the bishop during the so-called Second Swedish Crusade around 1249 and was not only religious, but also the secular leader of the conquered Finland. He succeeded in office Bishop Thomas, who had resigned three years earlier.

Bero seems to have been the same "Bishop B. of Finland" (B episcopus de Finlandia) who is listed among other Swedish bishops in a document from 1253, the first so appearing. The original letter has survived, with bishop's seal. No other records of the bishop remain.

== Residence in Koroinen ==
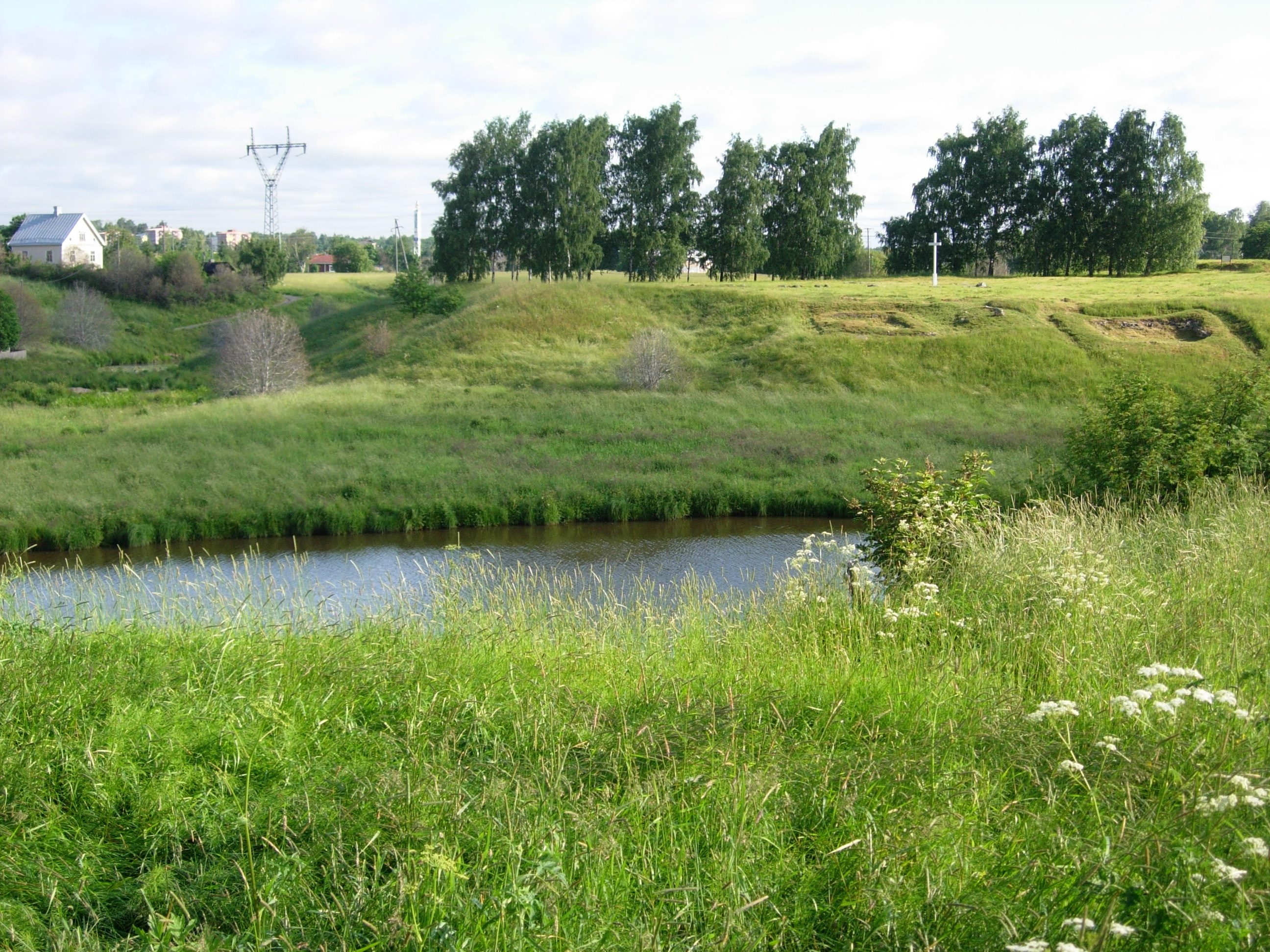
Koroinen today. The former episcopal residence is completely ruined.

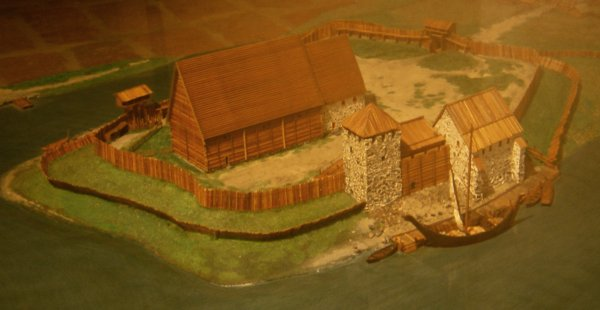
Koroinen in the 13th century. Scale model in the Castle of Turku Museum.

According to the older Chronicon, Bero was the first bishop to be buried in Räntämäki, apparently in Koroinen, the semi-fortified episcopal residence near Turku along the Aura river. Archaeological excavations have revealed three episcopal graves from the church ruins, rather certainly belonging to Bero and his two successors that were all claimed to have been buried there. It is not known, when the see was moved to Koroinen, but Bishop Thomas is known to have worked in Nousiainen still in 1234. Some historians believe that the see was moved to Koroinen already before Bero, even as early as 1229, but that remains speculative.

The modest cathedral in Koroinen, entirely made of wood at the time of Bero, was dedicated to Saint Mary, like the previous see in Nousiainen. Cathedral's dedication to Saint Mary continued also later, when it was moved to its current location in Turku at the end of the 13th century.

In addition to Koroinen, there were larger Swedish garrisons four kilometers along the Aura river inland, later known as the "Old Castle of Lieto".

== Dominicans ==
Koroinen was also the home of the first Dominican convent in Finland. According to Dominican annals of their Skänninge abbey, the brotherhood seems to have arrived to the country with Bero and his retinue in 1249. Dominicans also left Koroinen with the bishop at the end of the 13th century, moving close to the new Cathedral of Turku. Their convent in Turku was dedicated to Saint Olav.

== Legacy ==
Bero was succeeded by Bishop Ragvald. Bero appears to have been the last Bishop of Finland, since his successors were referred to as the Bishop of Turku, first mentioned in 1259 (episcopo et dilectis filiis capitulo Aboensi). Naming the bishopric by the see harmonized its name with other Swedish dioceses, in a way a milestone in Finland's integration to Sweden. Counting from Bero, the Finnish church remained under Archbishop of Uppsala for 560 years.
