= Kurjenrahka National Park =

National park in Finland Proper region, Finland

- IUCN category II (national park)
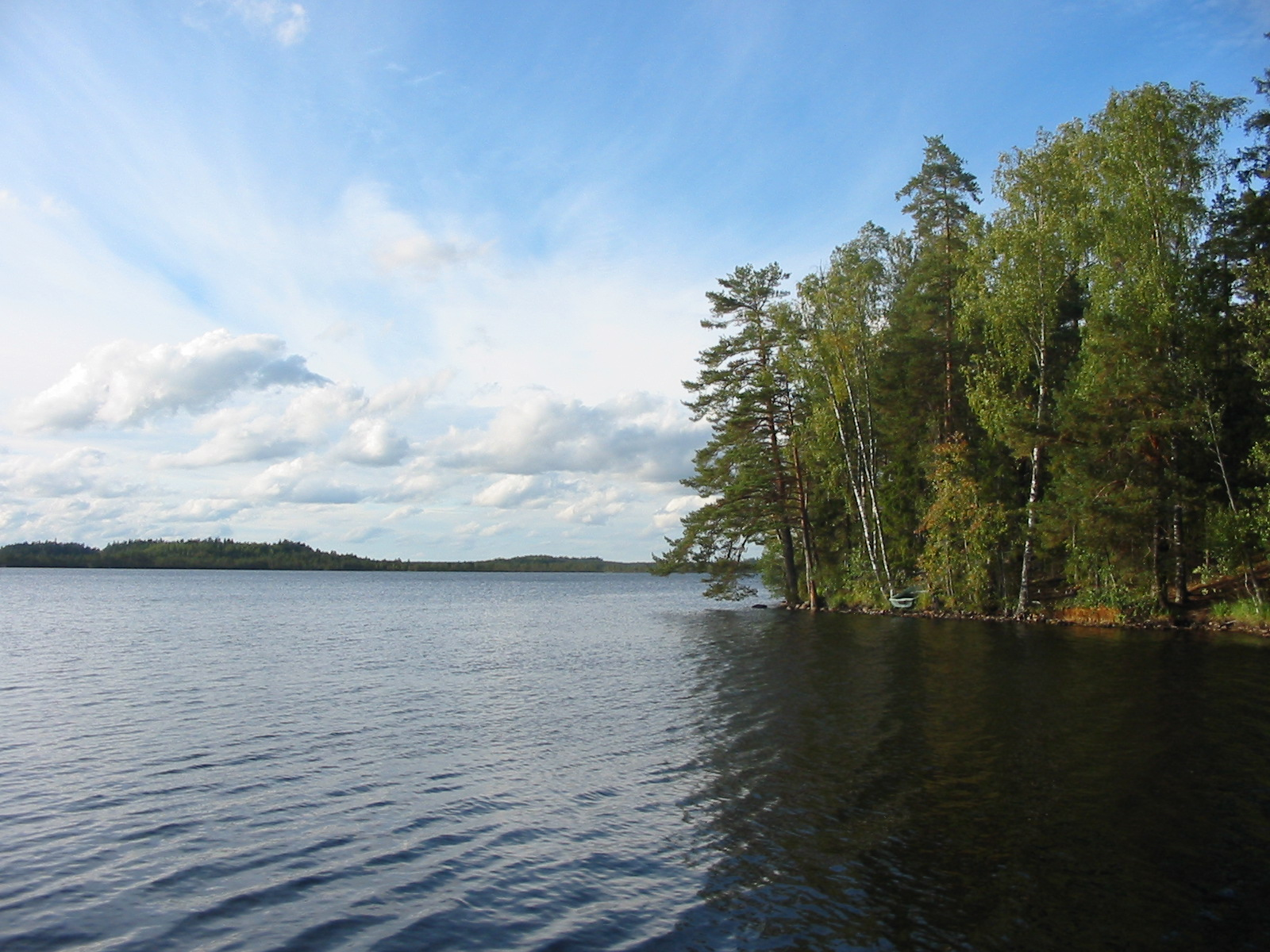

- Location within Finland
- Location: Southwest Finland, Finland
- Coordinates: 60°43′14″N 22°23′01″E
- Area: 29 km^{2} (11 sq mi)
- Established: 1998
- Visitors: 66,800 (in 2024)
- Governing body: Metsähallitus
- Website: https://www.luontoon.fi/en/destinations/kurjenrahka-national-park

Kurjenrahka National Park (Finnish: Kurjenrahkan kansallispuisto, Swedish: Kurjenrahka nationalpark) is a national park in Southwest Finland. It was established in 1998 and covers 29 square kilometres (11 sq mi). The area consists mainly of bog but also includes primeval forests, some of which have been unmanaged for over 150 years. The northern lynx is a permanent resident of Kurjenrahka, but Eurasian brown bears and Eurasian wolves have also been observed and are known to reside in areas within or close to the park. Marked trails in the general area extend to over 300 km. It includes several lakes, such as Mynäjärvi.

In Middle Ages the forests were jointly owned by the local parish. In early 1800s two manors bought them, but they had financially hard times and had to sell them to the state before end of the 19th century. Before selling, they logged clear all areas with easy access, but some islands in middle of mires remained unlogged.

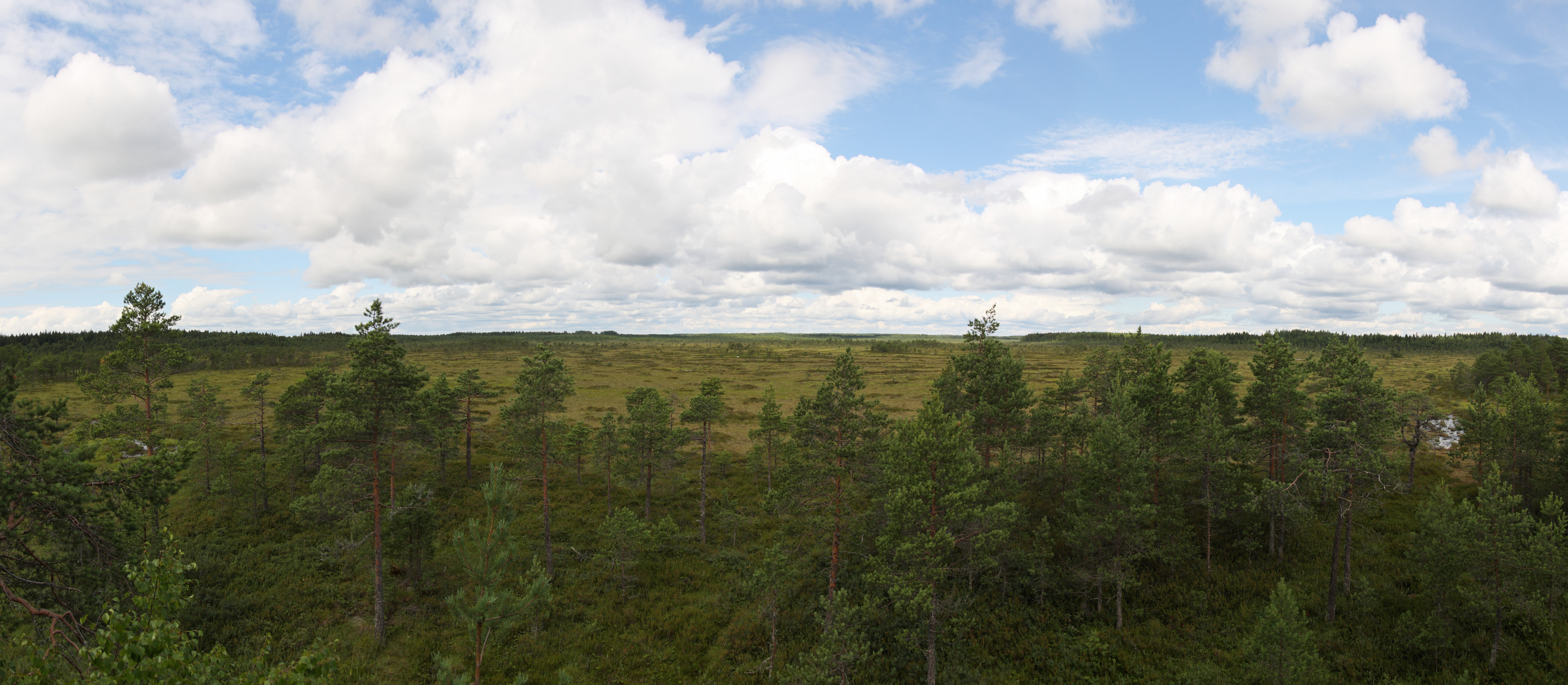
The bog Vajosuo in Kurjenrahka National Park.
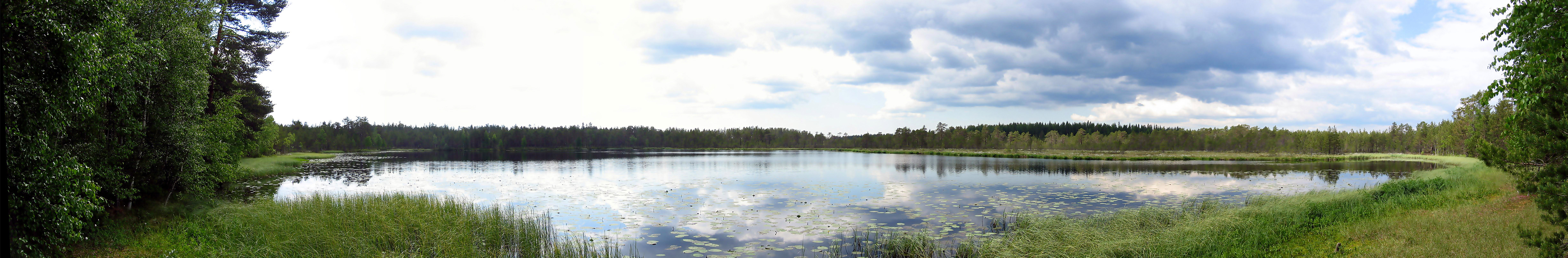
Boggy-shored lake Lakjärvi in Kurjenrahka National Park.

== See also ==
- List of national parks of Finland
- Protected areas of Finland
