= Fulco (bishop of Estonia) =

Missionary Bishop of Estonia

Fulco was the first known missionary Bishop of Estonia. He was appointed in 1165 by Eskil, the Danish Archbishop of Lund. Before his appointment, Fulco was a Benedictine monk in the abbey of Moutier-la-Celle, near Troyes in France. His nationality is not known.

After his appointment, Fulco appears in sources only once. In 1171, Pope Alexander III asked the Archbishop of Trondheim to assign an Estonian monk Nicolaus living in Stavanger to go to Fulco's assistance. No further information survives about Fulco's work in Estonia, or whether he ever even got there.

== Identification with Folquinus ==
Fulco is sometimes speculated to be the same person as a certain Folquinus, a late 12th century Bishop of Finland, briefly mentioned in a mid-15th century chronicle Chronicon episcoporum Finlandensium after equally legendary Rodulff and before quite historical Thomas. The chronicle claimed him to be Swedish by birth. Folquinus was again mentioned in another chronicle of the same name by Paulus Juusten, the Bishop of Turku, about 100 years later, adding that during a Russian attack to Finland in 1198 he was still in office. However, no such attack is known from other sources, and Paulus Juusten seems to have based his claim of an attack on an incorrect reading of the year, as Novgorodians did attack Turku in 1318.

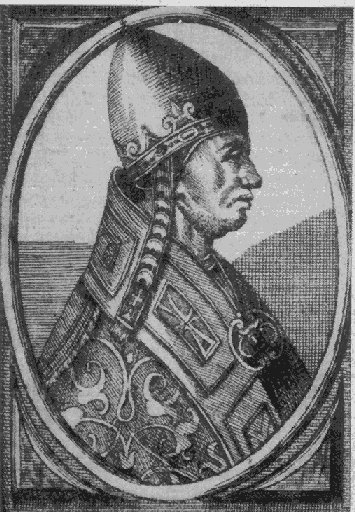
Pope Alexander III (pictured) was the first Pope to address the situation of the Catholic mission in Estonia and Finland.

The name "Fulco" appears in unrelated Scandinavian sources as the Latinized form of "Folke". Also Folquinus is known to have stood for Folke in various medieval texts, as the Latin suffix -inus (meaning "pertaining to") in the name just emphasizes its first part. As the two bishops had similar names and they worked roughly around the same time in neighboring areas under Lund's missionary supervision, possibility for the identification remains, although the church in Finland is officially sceptical about it.

Noteworthy is that while organizing assistance to the Estonian mission, Pope Alexander III was also closely following the situation in Finland, something that no previous Pope is known to have done. Eskil and Stefan, the Archbishop of Uppsala, who had also been appointed to his high office by Eskil in 1164, were both close acquaintances with the Pope, having met in France while the Pope had been exiled there in the 1160s. In Pope's letter to Stefan in 1171 (or 1172), he complains how Finns only turned to God at the time of war, harassing preachers as soon as the peril was over. No Diocese or Bishop of Finland is mentioned in the papal letter, and no information survives, whether it prompted any actions. In the apparent shortage of missionaries, it can be speculated that the frustrated Pope may have organized Fulco to deal with the Finns as soon as his assistant Nicolaus could have taken over the missionary work in Estonia.

If information about Folquinus still being in office in 1198 is correct, his identification with Fulco would require him to have worked in missionary assignments for more than 30 years, in any case reaching a rather high age for a man of his times. In a letter by Pope Innocent III to Anders Sunesen, the Archbishop of Lund, in 1209, an unnamed Bishop of Finland is mentioned to have died "lawfully" (i.e., a natural death) sometime earlier. By repeating Archbishop's own words, the letter makes it clear that the dead bishop had been appointed by the Lund archbishopric or at least with its approval, and that the "recent" establishment of the church in Finland was work of the Danes or their close allies, "caretaking of a few noble men". The Archbishop had also complained to the Pope how difficult it was to get anyone to be a bishop in Finland and planned to appoint someone without formal adequacy, which the Pope approved of without questioning Archbishop's opinions.

In surviving lists of Swedish bishoprics from 1164, 1189 and 1192, there is no reference, factual or propagandist, to the Diocese or Bishop of Finland.

== See also ==
- Henry (bishop of Finland)
- Thomas (bishop of Finland)
- Theoderich von Treyden
