= Nousiainen =

Nousiainen Nousis
- Municipality
- Nousiaisten kunta Nousis kommun
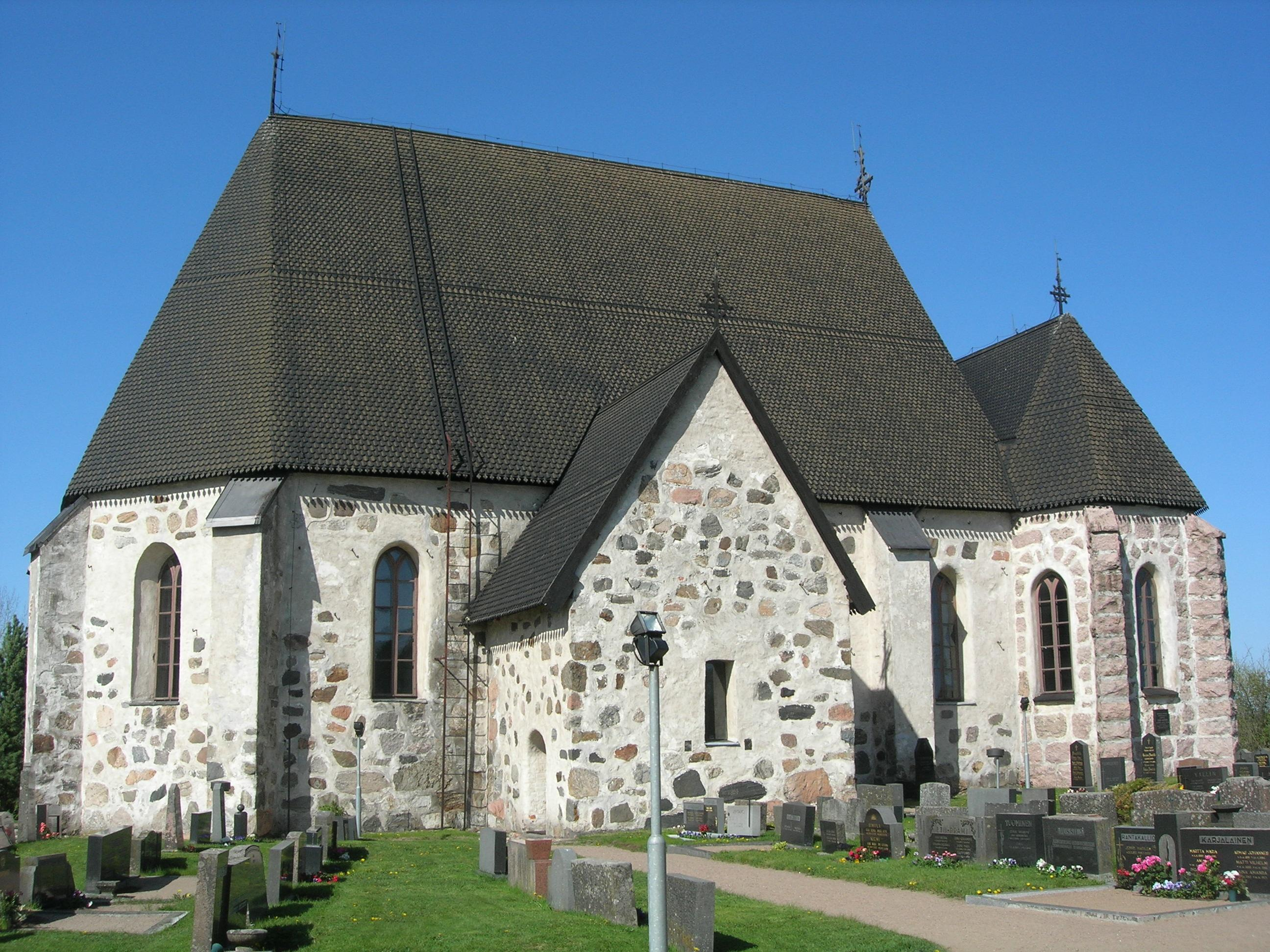
- Nousiainen Church

- Coat of arms

- Location of Nousiainen in Finland
- Interactive map of Nousiainen
- Coordinates: 60°36′N 022°05′E
- Country: Finland
- Region: Southwest Finland
- Sub-region: Turku sub-region
- Charter: 1867

Government
  - Municipal manager: Juhani Kylämäkilä

Area (2018-01-01)
  - Total: 199.55 km^{2} (77.05 sq mi)
  - Land: 198.93 km^{2} (76.81 sq mi)
  - Water: 0.62 km^{2} (0.24 sq mi)
  - Rank: 263rd largest in Finland

Population (2025-12-31)
  - Total: 4,667
  - Rank: 174th largest in Finland
  - Density: 23.46/km^{2} (60.8/sq mi)

Population by native language
  - Finnish: 95.4% (official)
  - Swedish: 0.9%
  - Others: 3.6%

Population by age
  - 0 to 14: 19%
  - 15 to 64: 60.3%
  - 65 or older: 20.6%
- Time zone: UTC+02:00 (EET)
  - Summer (DST): UTC+03:00 (EEST)
- Climate: Dfb
- Website: nousiainen.fi

Nousiainen (Finnish: [ˈnou̯siˌɑi̯nen]; Swedish: Nousis) is a municipality of Finland. It is located in the Southwest Finland region, 20 kilometres (12 mi) from Turku along Highway 8 (E8). The Finnish-speaking municipality has a population of 4,667 (31 December 2025) and covers an area of 199.55 square kilometres (77.05 sq mi) of which 0.62 km^{2} (0.24 sq mi) is water. The population density is 23.46 inhabitants per square kilometre (60.8/sq mi).

There are two Natura 2000 sites in Nousiainen: the Kurjenrahka National Park and the Rehtisuo Raised Bog.

== History ==
Nousiainen was an "ancient parish" (a unit of social organization) before Swedish rule.

Nousiainen was the first seat of the bishop of Finland until the early 13th century, when the seat was shifted to Koroinen, nowadays a part of Turku. It remained, however, a place of pilgrimage throughout the Middle Ages. The coat of arms of Nousiainen depicts Bishop Henry and Lalli.

Nousiainen was mentioned in 1232 as de Nousia and in 1234 as Nosis. Its name is derived from a pre-Christian Finnish personal name Nousia, still the name of some 10-20 men in 2022. Even after the bishopric was moved to Koroinen, Nousiainen was still an important pilgrimage site until the reformation, as it was thought that bishop Henry was buried there.

The village of Nummi, the current administrative seat of the municipality, was mentioned in 1380 as Nummusby. Court sessions for Nousiainen, Masku and Santamala were held there at the time. By 1556, Nummi was the largest village in Nousiainen.

In 1895 a Viking-Age coin hoard was found in Nousiainen which contained around 1,700 coins and other objects weighing a total of approximately 2.2 kilograms. Until 2026 it was the largest such hoard found in Finland.

== Economics ==
Agriculture has always been Nousiainen's most significant industry. Significant employers also included Teleste Oyj's electronics factory, which, however, has already closed down in the municipality. In 2015, the municipality had 1,009 jobs; of these, 11% were in primary production (agriculture, forestry and fishery), 72% in services and 15% in processing. The companies that paid the most corporate tax in 2016 were FCR Finland, which operates in the shipbuilding industry, Mynämäen-Nousiaisten Osuuspankki and Maalausliike Helin.

== Culture ==
=== Food ===
Sweetened potato casserole, or imelet perunloora in the local dialect, was named the traditional parish dish of Nousiainen in the 1980s.

== Notable people ==
- Mikko Rantanen (born 1996), professional ice hockey player for the Dallas Stars of the National Hockey League (NHL)

== Gallery ==
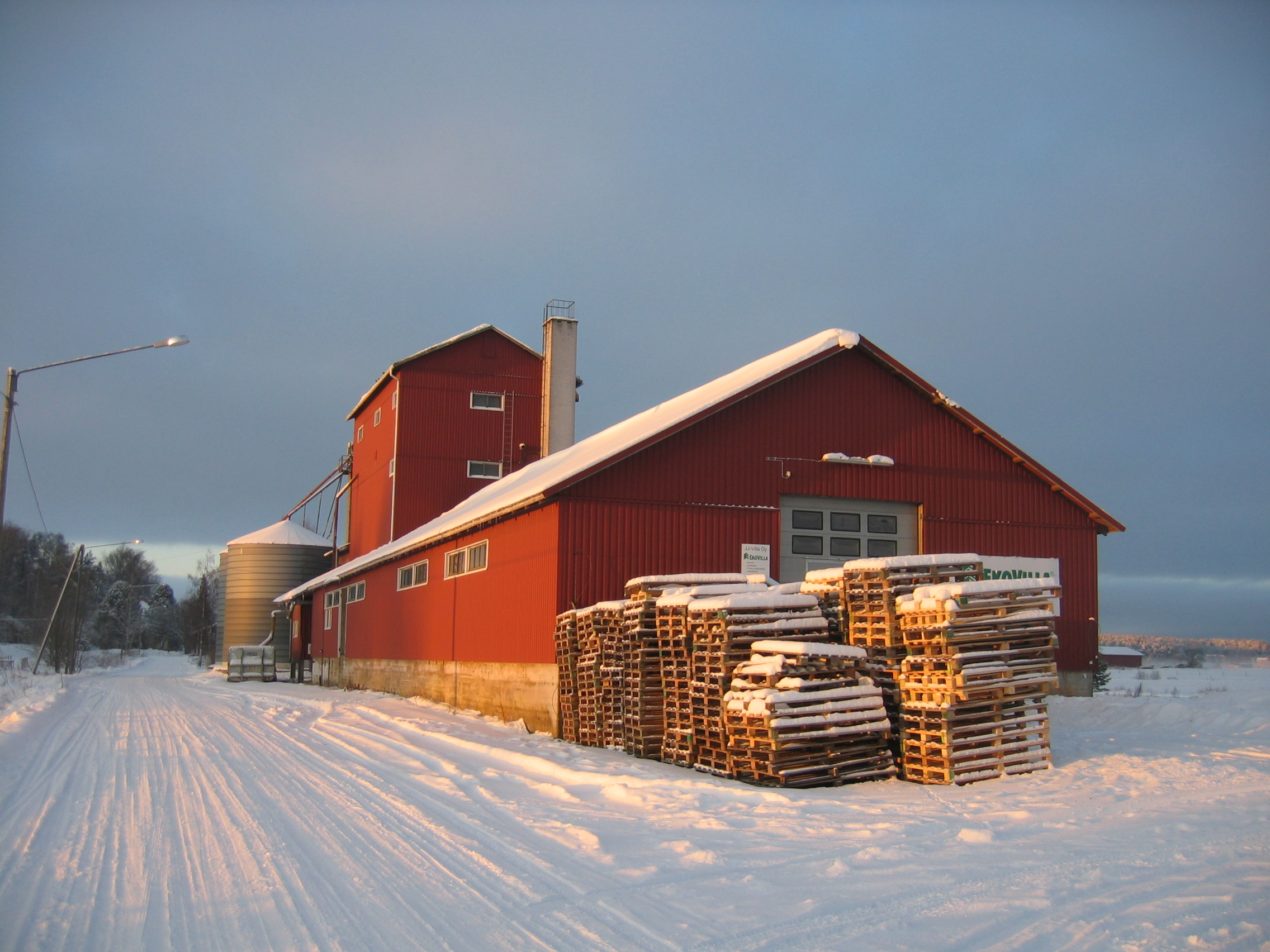
A grain processing facility by the Turku–Uusikaupunki railway in Nousiainen

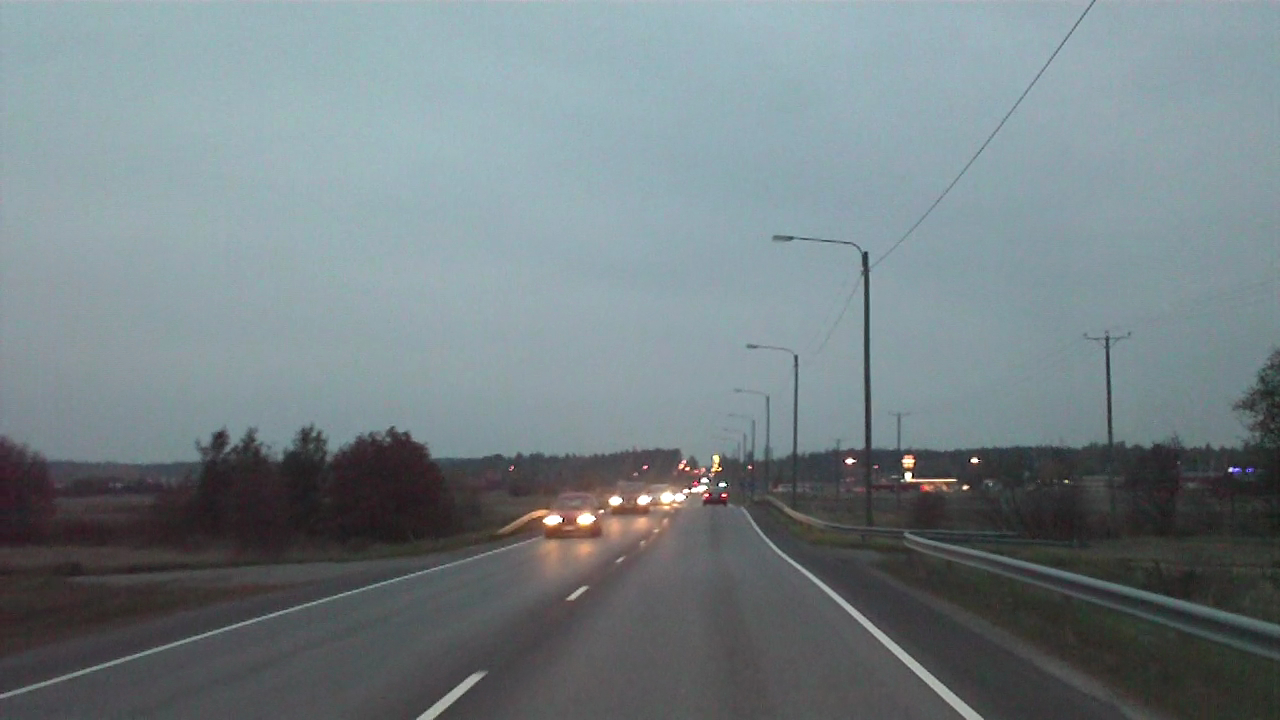
European route E8 in Nousiainen

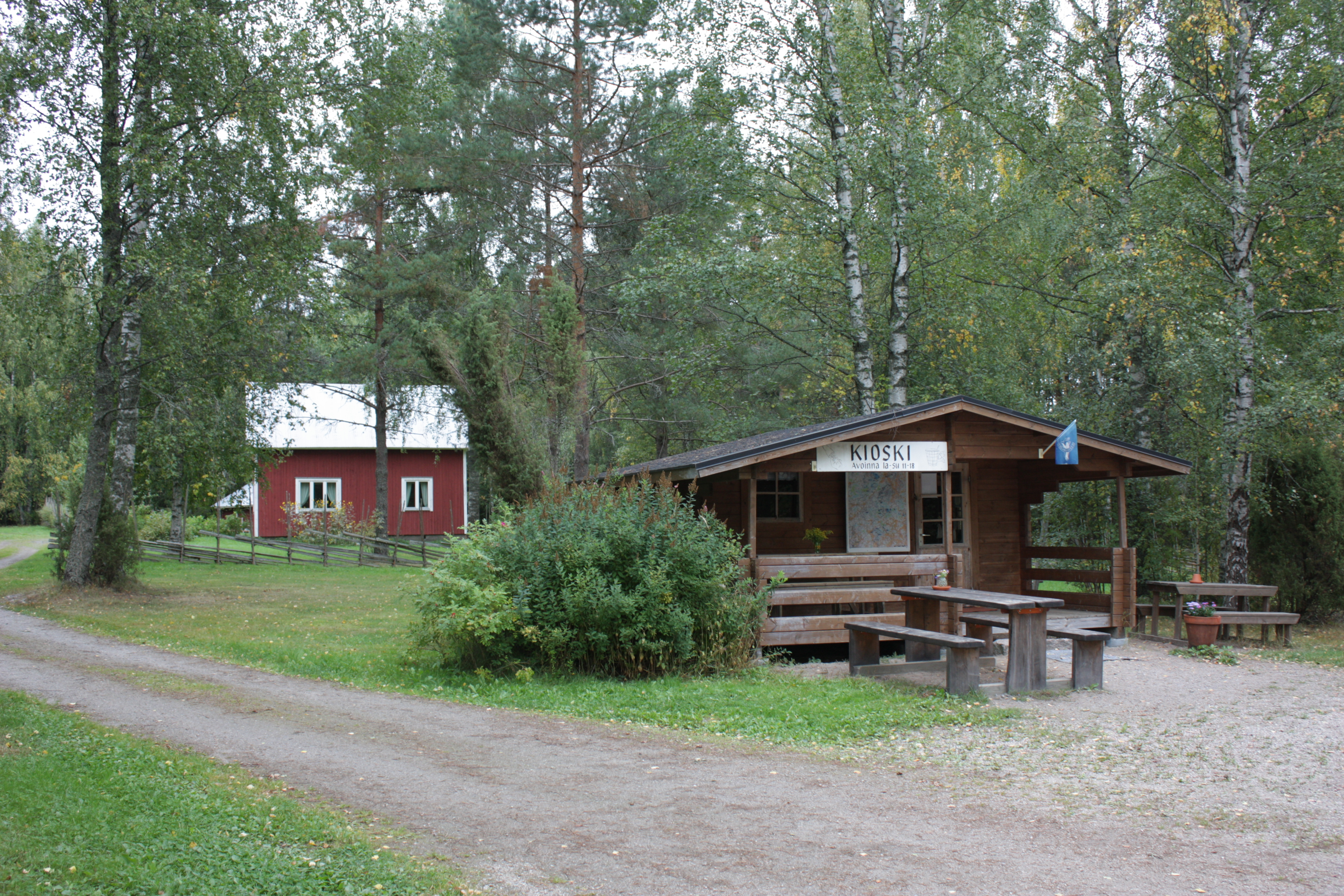
A kiosk at the Rantapiha recreational area by the Lake Savojärvi near Kurjenrahka National Park

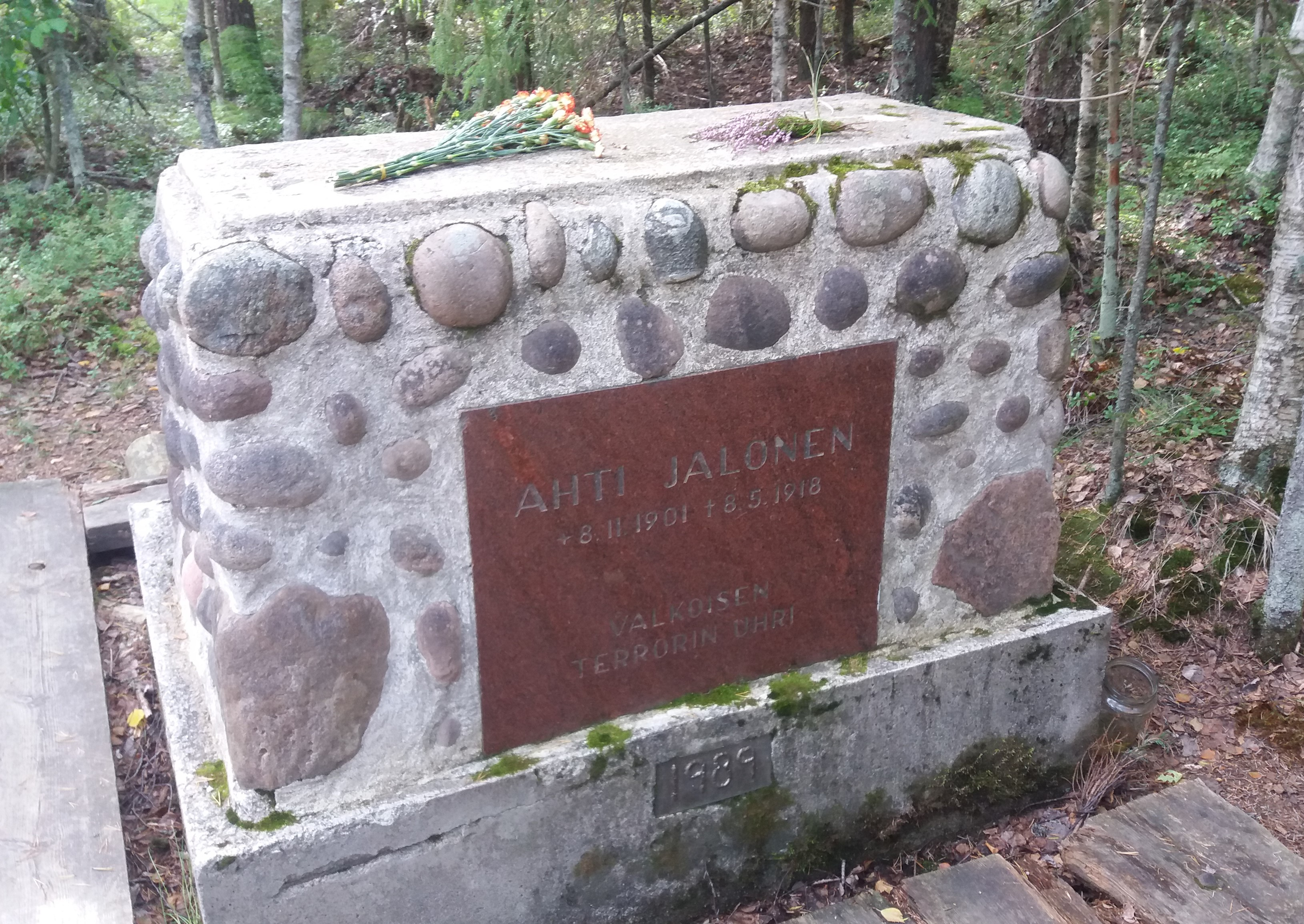
The memorial of Ahti Jalonen (1901–1918), a young victim of the White Terror during the Finnish Civil War

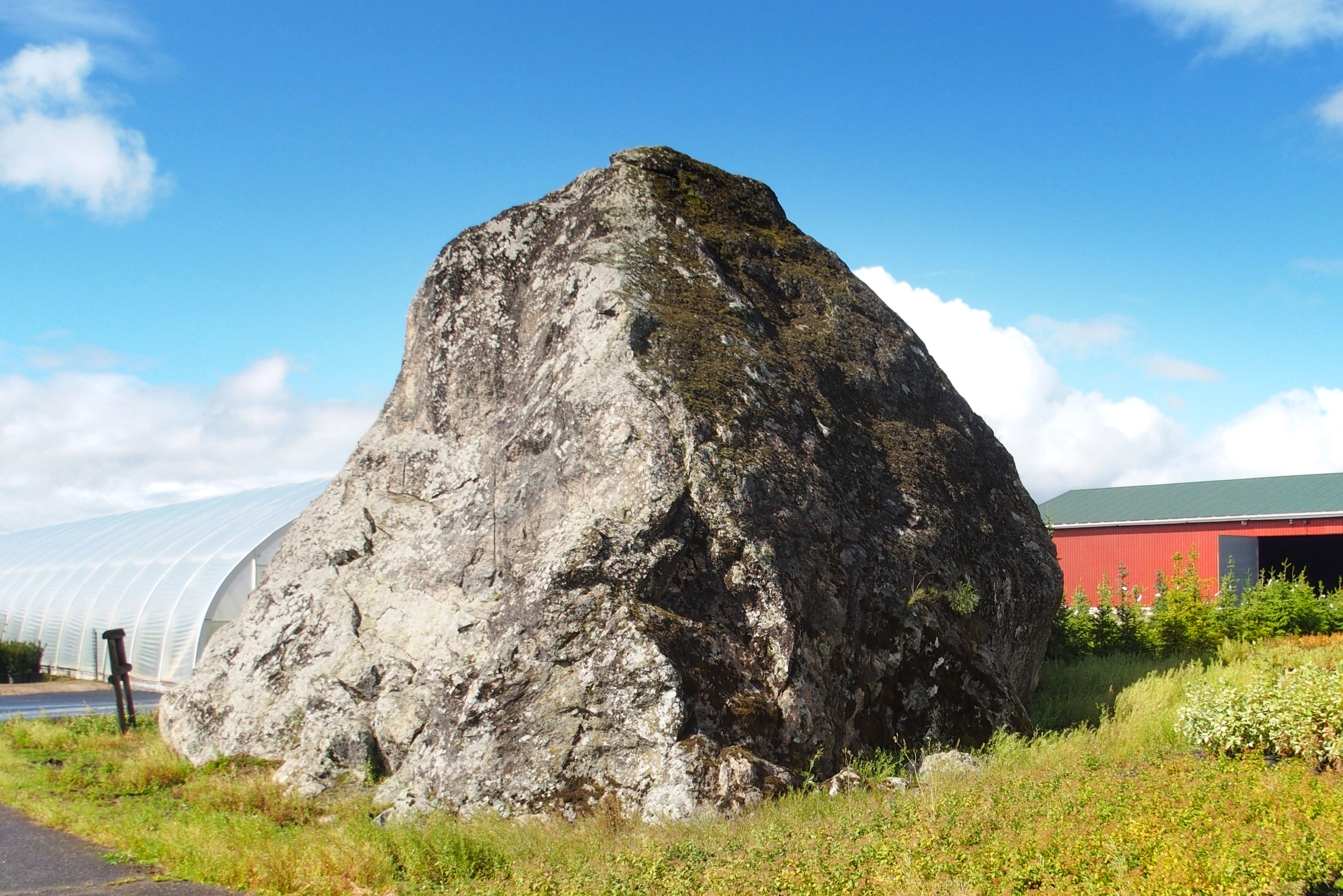
Emovaha glacial erratic in Nousiainen

== See also ==
- Masku
