= Rodulff =

Bishop of Finland

Rodulff (Rodulf) is claimed by a 15th-century chronicle Chronicon episcoporum Finlandensium to have worked as a missionary "bishop" in Finland after Bishop Henry had died in the 1150s. Rodulff was allegedly from Västergötland in Sweden.

No historical records of Rodulff survive, and no Bishop or Diocese of Finland is mentioned in a papal letter from 1171 (or 1172) by the seemingly well-informed Pope Alexander III, who otherwise addressed the situation of the church in Finland. However, the Pope mentions that there were preachers, presumably from Sweden, working in Finland and was worried about their bad treatment by the Finns. Pope had earlier in 1165 authorized the first missionary Bishop of Estonia to be appointed, and was a close acquaintance of both Eskil, the Archbishop of Lund, and Stefan, the Archbishop of Uppsala, who both had spent time with him in France where he had been exiled in the 1160s. Following the situation in Estonia, Pope personally interfered in the Estonian mission in 1171.

Furthermore, in a surviving list of Swedish bishoprics from 1164, there is no reference, factual or propagandist, to Finland.

According to the Chronicon, Rodulff was captured and killed by Curonians and succeeded by Bishop Folquinus.

Though other legends possibly place his death in Piispanristi.

== See also ==
- List of bishops of Turku
