= Theoderich von Treyden =

Missionary working in Livonia

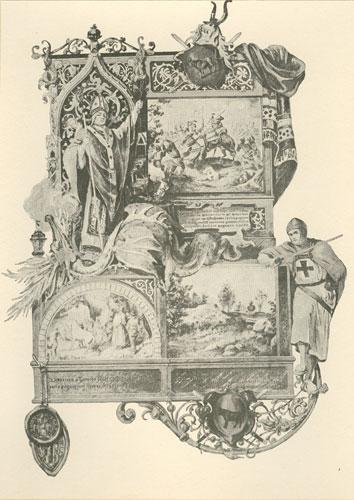
Theoderich von Treyden 1.jpg

Theoderich (or Theoderich von Treyden) (c. 1160 - died 15 June 1219) was a bishop in Estonia.

He was a Cistercian monk working as a priest in Turaida (1191–1202). In 1202 he became the first abbot of Daugavgrīva monastery (1202–1211). He was appointed Bishop of Estonia during 1211–1219 by Albert of Buxhoeveden, the Bishop of Riga. He was the second known missionary in Livonia after Saint Meinhard, the first Bishop of Livonia. He had apparently worked in missionary activities in Estonia already in 1191.

He founded the Order of the Brothers of the Sword (Fratres Milicie Christi) in 1202.

Theoderich sided with King Waldemar II of Denmark and was killed by Estonians at the Battle of Lyndanisse. After his death, the title "Bishop of Estonia" was no longer used, being temporarily replaced by the "Bishop of Leal" before the Estonian territory was divided into several dioceses.

What little is known about Theoderich's life, is recorded in several contemporary documents and the Livonian Chronicle of Henry.

== See also ==
- Fulco, Bishop of Estonia
