= Koroinen =

District of Turku, Finland

Coordinates: 60°27′58″N 22°17′22″E

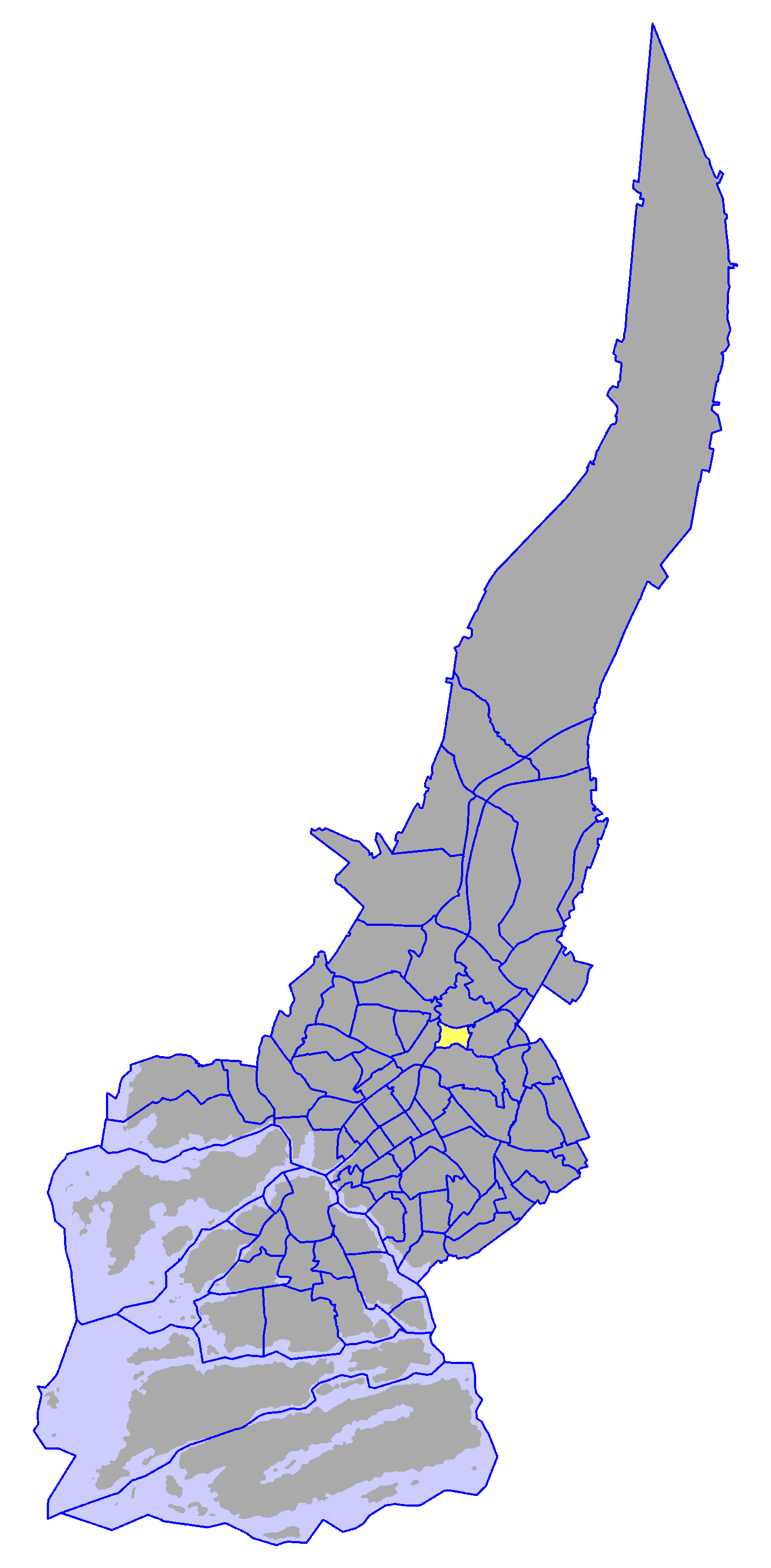
Koroinen on a map of Turku.

Koroinen (Finnish: [ˈkoroi̯nen]; Korois in Swedish) is a district in the Koroinen ward of the city of Turku, in Finland. It is located to the north of the city centre, across the river Aura from the Turku Student Village. Koroinen is mostly non-built-up area, consisting largely of recreational area. The current (as of 2016) population of the district is 15.

== History ==
Koroinen was the residence of Bishop of Finland until 1300 when it was moved a couple of kilometres further down the River Aura, to the present-day Cathedral of Turku. The exact time when the bishop moved to Koroinen is not known, but that probably took place soon after the Second Swedish Crusade in 1249.

The church in Koroinen was later destroyed by the Victual Brothers in 1396. There is a white, wooden memorial cross and some stone foundations still remaining on site.

== Burials ==
- Bero (Bishop of Finland)
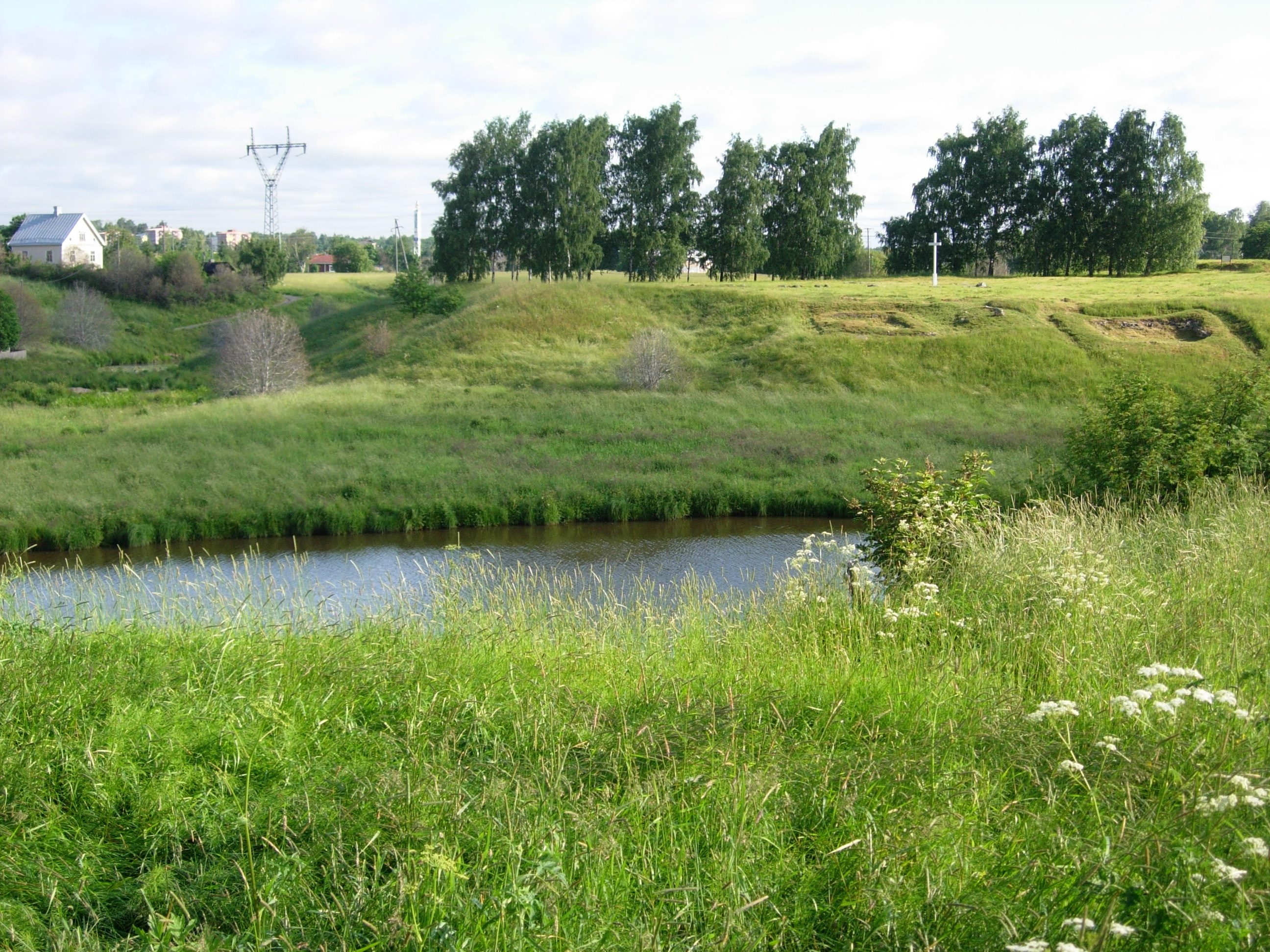
Koroistenniemi

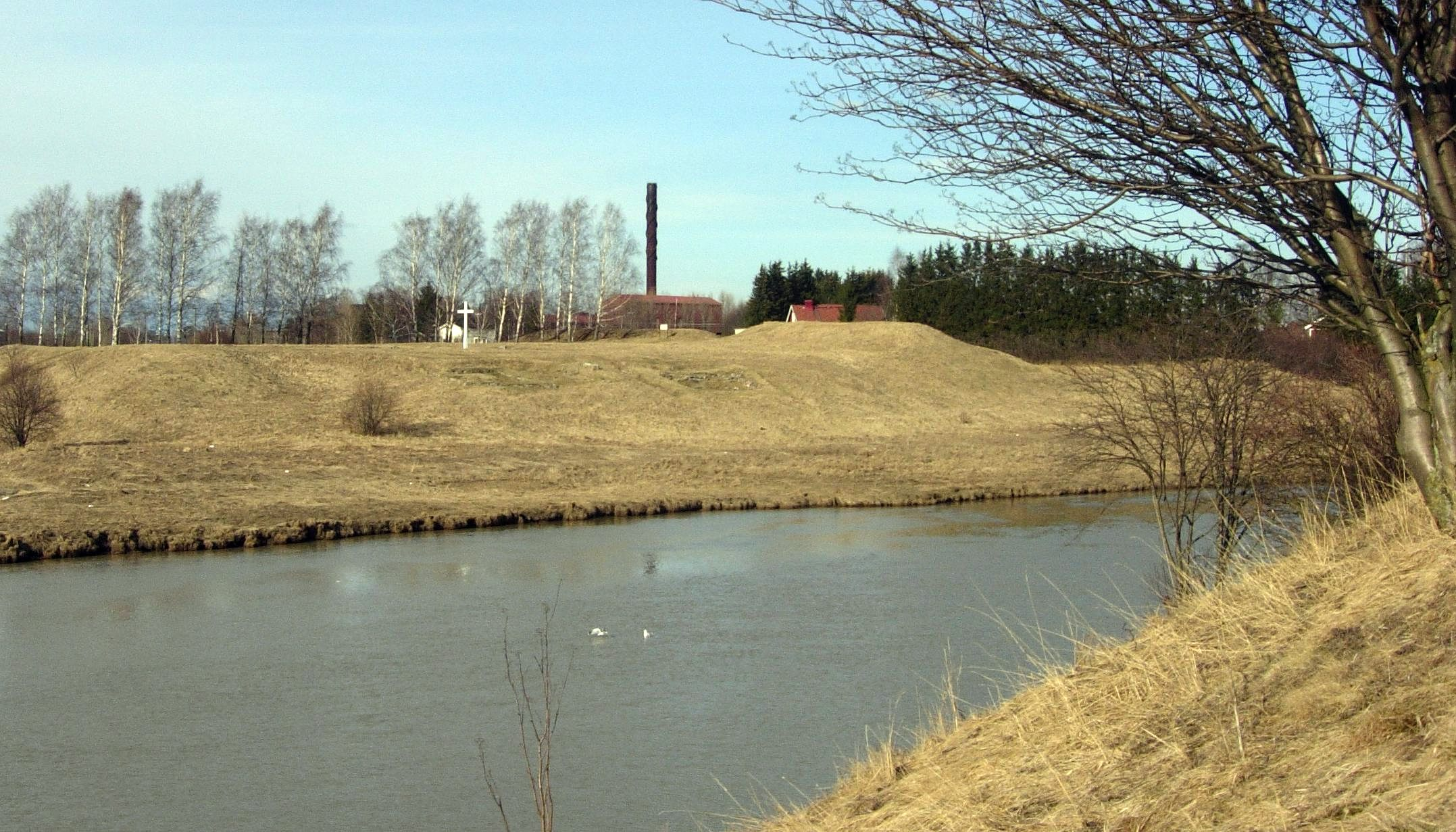

== See also ==
- Districts of Turku
- Districts of Turku by population
