= Stefan (archbishop of Uppsala) =

Archbishop of Uppsala from 1164 to 1185

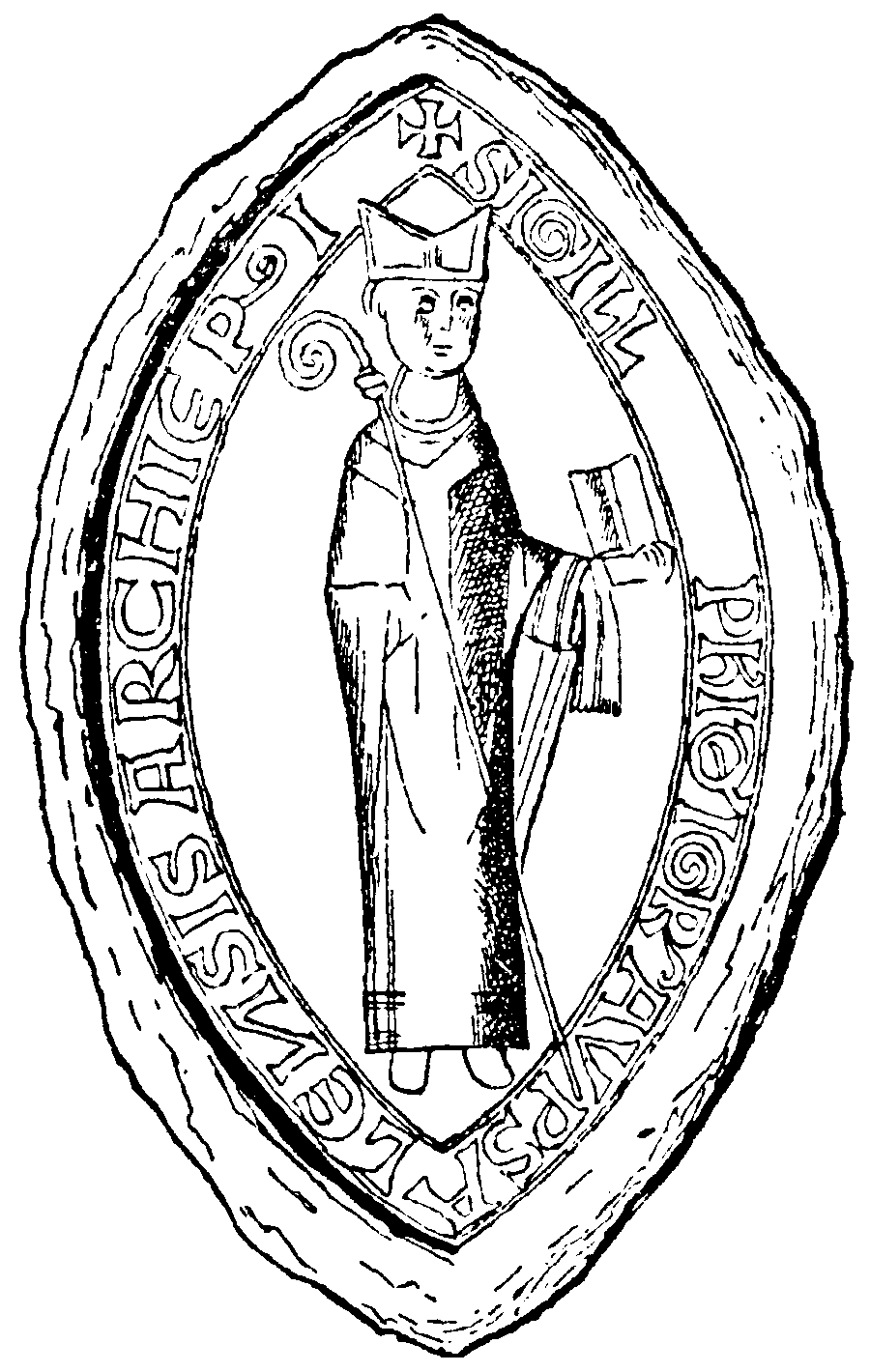
Insignia of Stefan

Stefan (before 1143 – 18 July 1185) was the first Archbishop of Uppsala in Sweden in the year 1164, a post he held until his death.

Stefan was a Cistercian monk from Alvastra monastery (of which he was one of the founders in 1143). His origin is not known, but it is believed that he was originally from England or Germany because many monks from the monastery were from those countries and because his name was rather uncommon in Sweden at that time.

In 1164 Stefan travelled to Sens in France to meet Pope Alexander III. The Pope was seeking refuge in Sens because of disputes in Rome. Present in Sens was another refugee: the archbishop of Lund (Denmark), Eskil, who had supported the wrong king in Denmark and thus been forced into exile.

The Pope agreed to grant Sweden an archbishop. This matter had already been discussed a decade earlier, but because of civil conflicts was never realized. A pallium had, however, been made in Lund for that occasion, and Eskil had brought it with him when he left Denmark. The pallium was now given to Stefan.

The archbishop of Lund was declared primate of Uppsala, and thereby given the right to ordain the archbishop of Uppsala. The primateship was upheld for a century until political conflicts between the two countries led to the independence of the Uppsala archbishopric, and thereafter the archbishop would travel to Rome to be ordained by the pope.

What is likely to be a protocol from the Sens meeting is still in existence at the Swedish Royal Library.

== See also ==
- List of archbishops of Uppsala
