= Emil Cedercreutz =

Finnish Baron, sculptor and silhouette artist

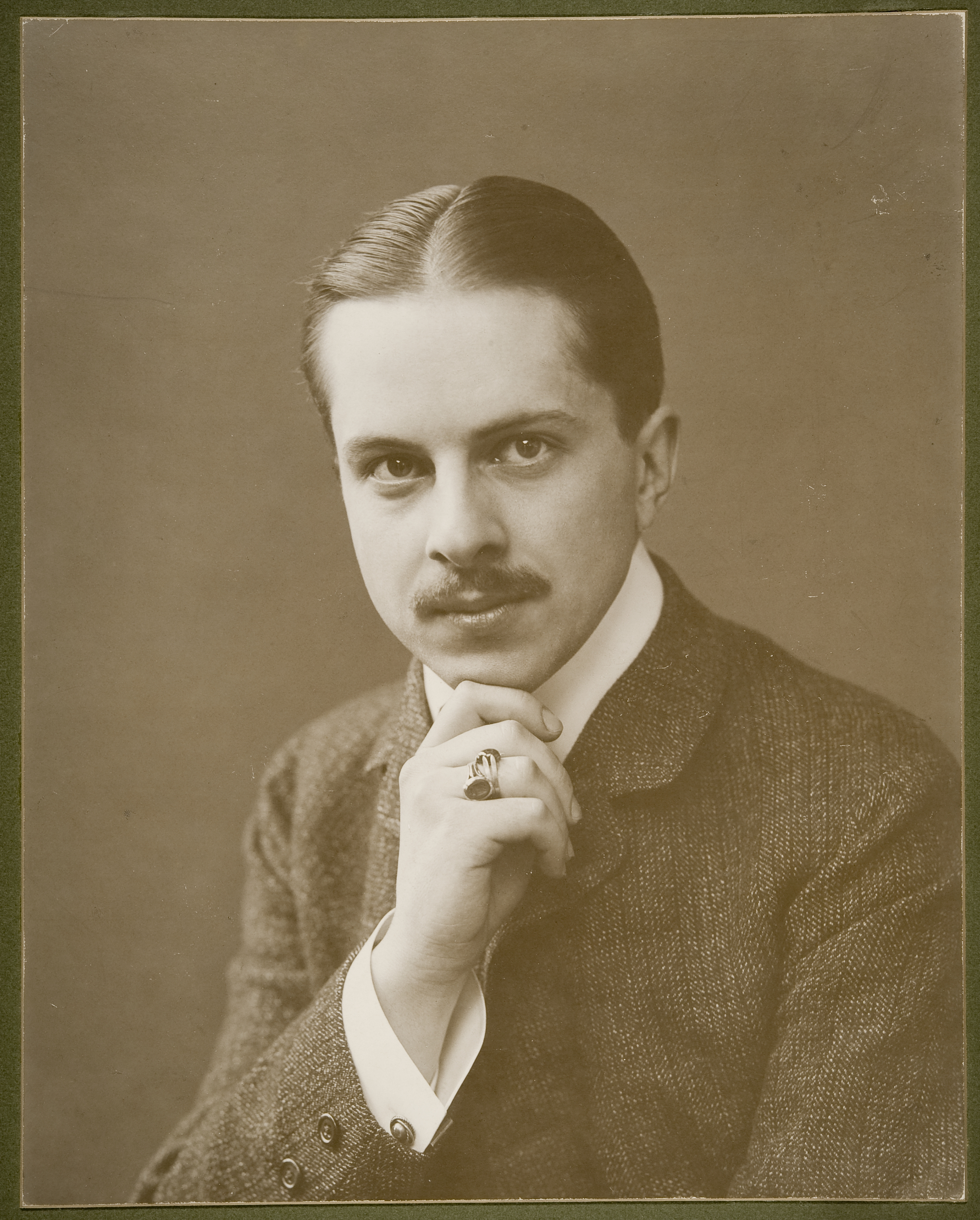
- Born: 16 May 1879; Köyliö, Grand Duchy of Finland
- Died: 28 January 1949 (aged 69); Harjavalta, Finland
- Education: Academy of Fine Arts, Helsinki
- Known for: Sculptor, silhouette artist

Emil Herman Robert Cedercreutz (16 May 1879 – 28 January 1949), was a Finnish Baron, sculptor, painter, and silhouette artist best known of his horse sculptures. He was a member of the Cedercreutz family.

== Life ==
Cedercreutz was born in the Köyliönkartano Manor. His parents were Baron Axel Fredrik Nicolaus Cedercreutz and Johanna Lovisa Mariana Björkenheim. Cedercreutz studied in the Finnish Art Society's Drawing School in Helsinki and later in Brussels 1903–1904, Rome 1904–1905 and in Académie Julian in Paris from 1906 to 1909. According to a 1917–1944 register of Finnish writers, he also studied at the Finnish Art Society's drawing school in 1897 and 1902, in Belgium from 1900 to 1903, and at the Académie Julian from 1906 to 1913. He was influenced by the sculptors like Charles van der Stappen, Constantin Meunier ja Auguste Rodin as well as the Tolstoyan movement.

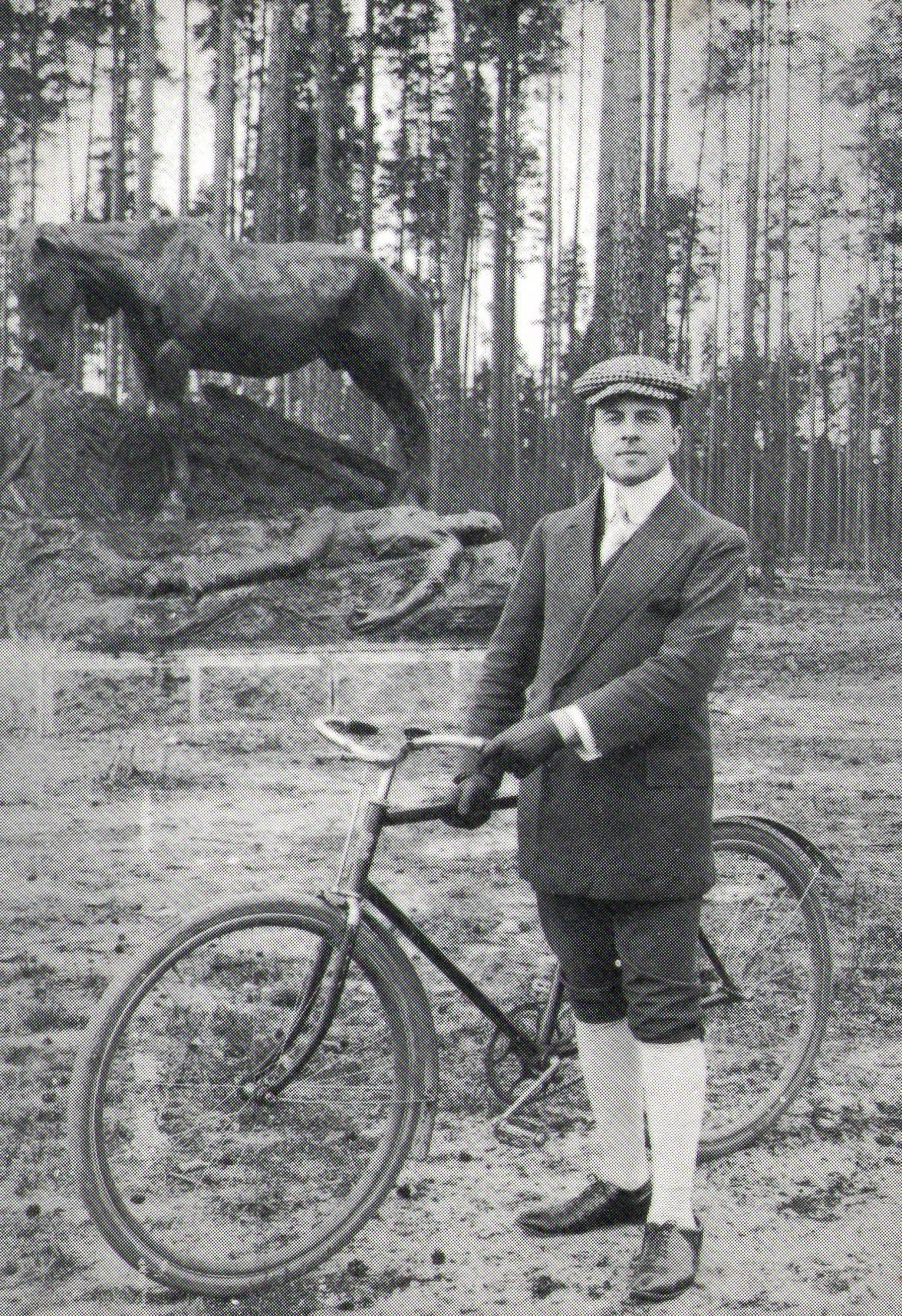
Emil Cedercreutz, c. 1910

In 1914 Cedercreutz started working in his new atelier by the river Kokemäenjoki in the municipality of Harjavalta. Cedercreutz was also collecting historical artifacts from the countryside of Satakunta province. 1916 he established a museum in Harjavalta, known today as the Emil Cedercreutz Museum, showing collections of Cedercreutz's work, cultural history and temporary art exhibitions.

== Works ==
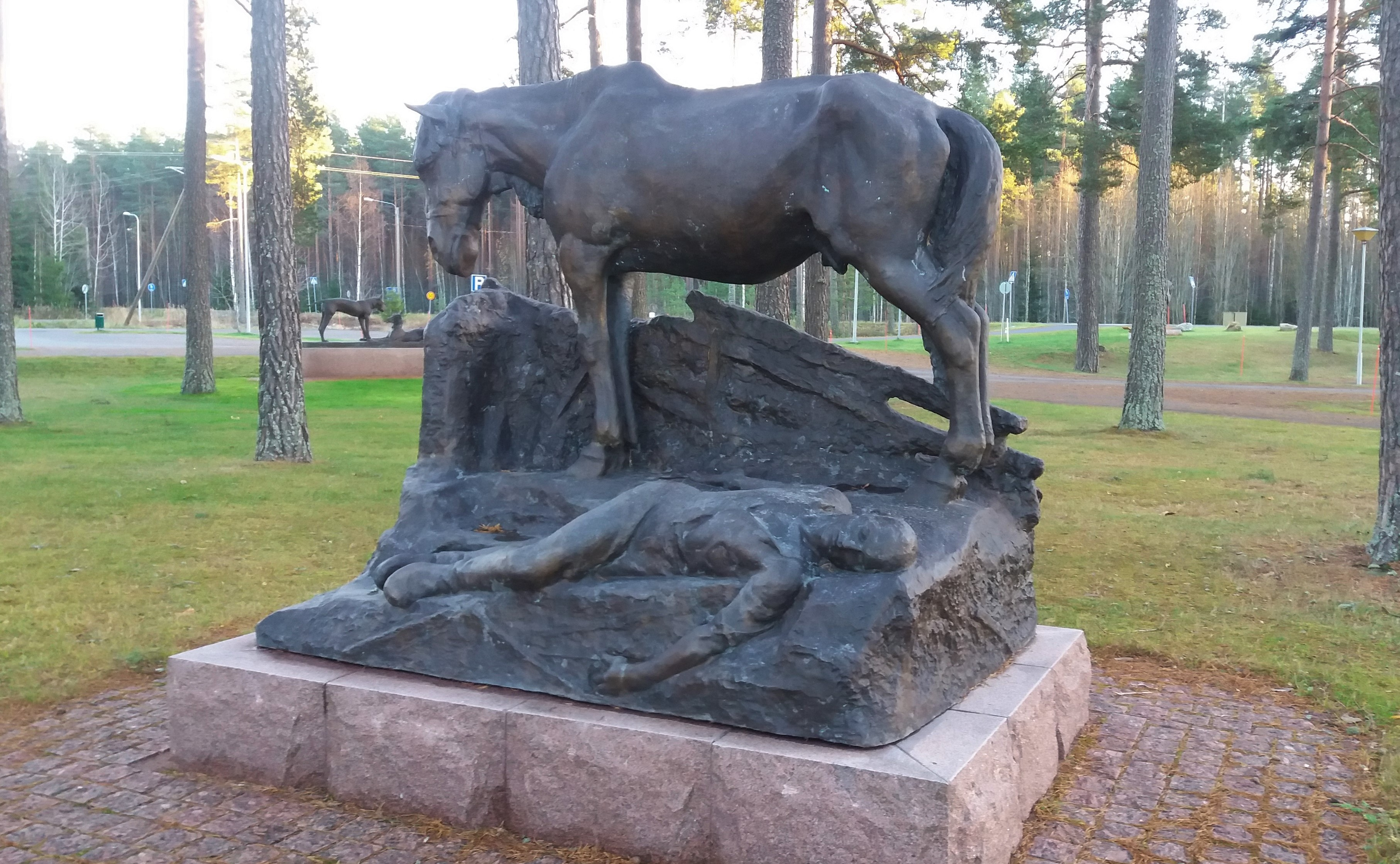
Aprés la tâche, 1904

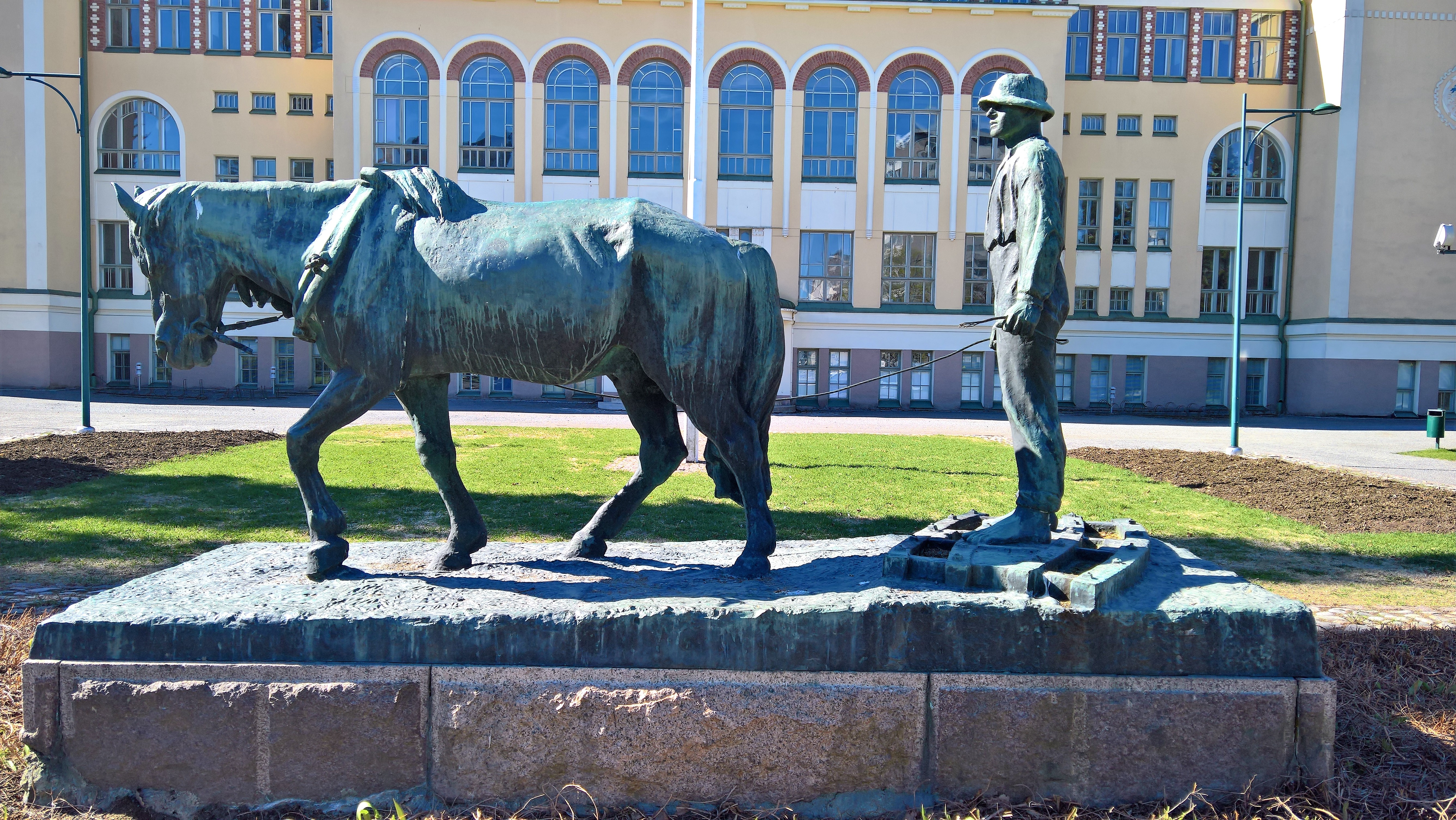
Äestäjä (Harrower), 1920

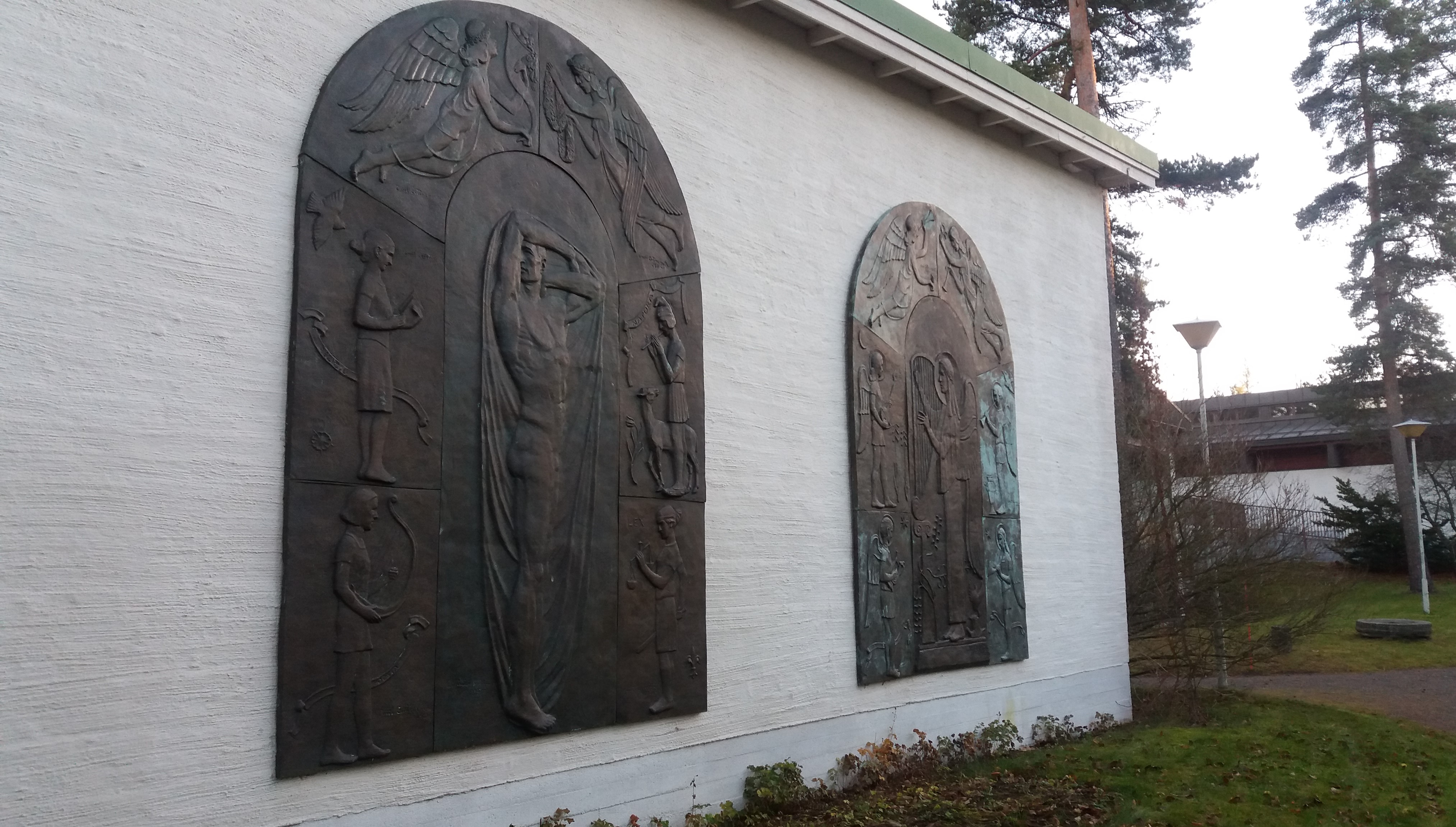
Reliefs Time and Eternity, 1920

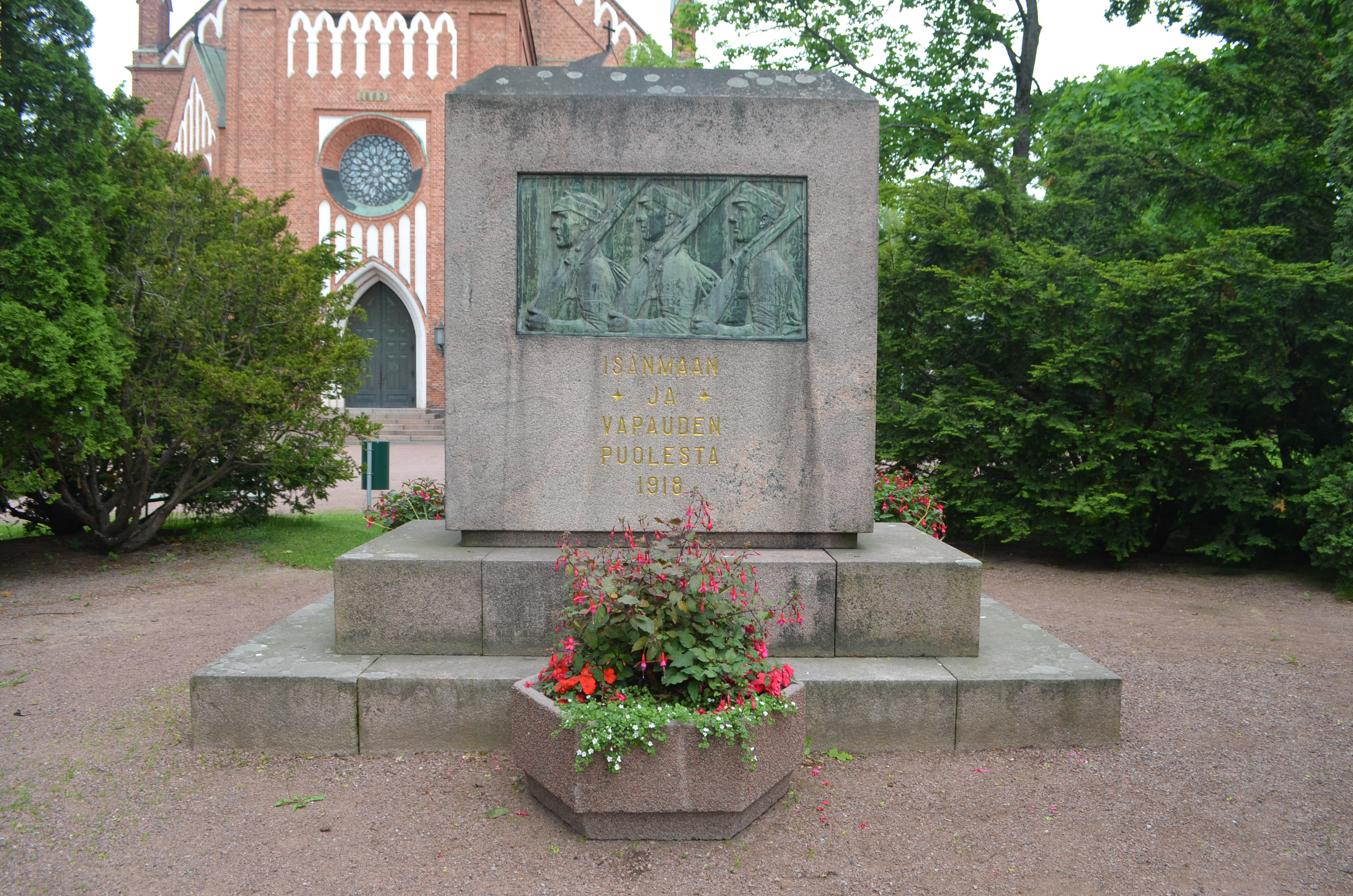
Memorial to those fallen in the Finnish Civil War, by the Central Pori Church, 1920

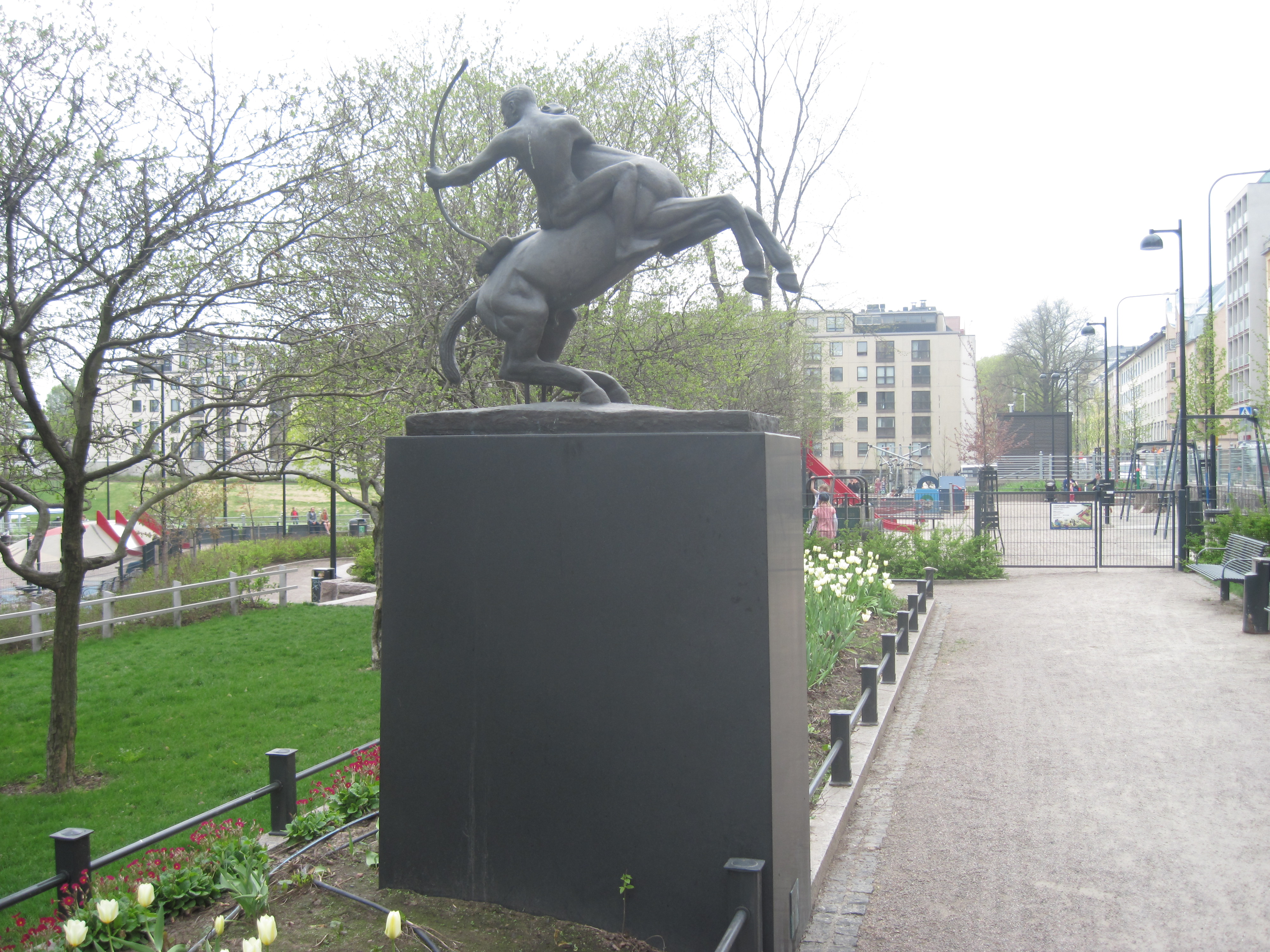
Arcum Tendit Apollo, 1924, Helsinki

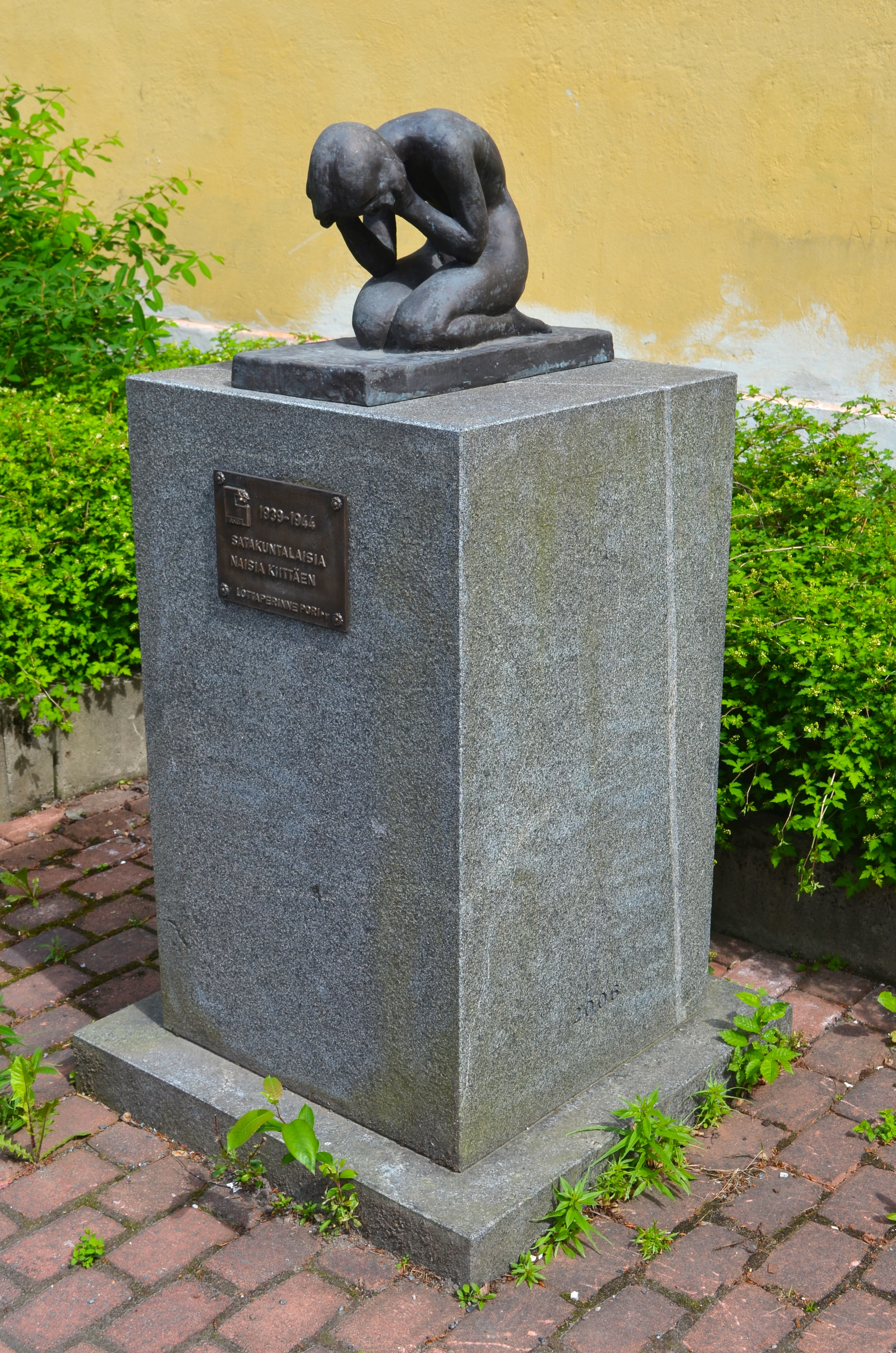
Crying Girl, 1928

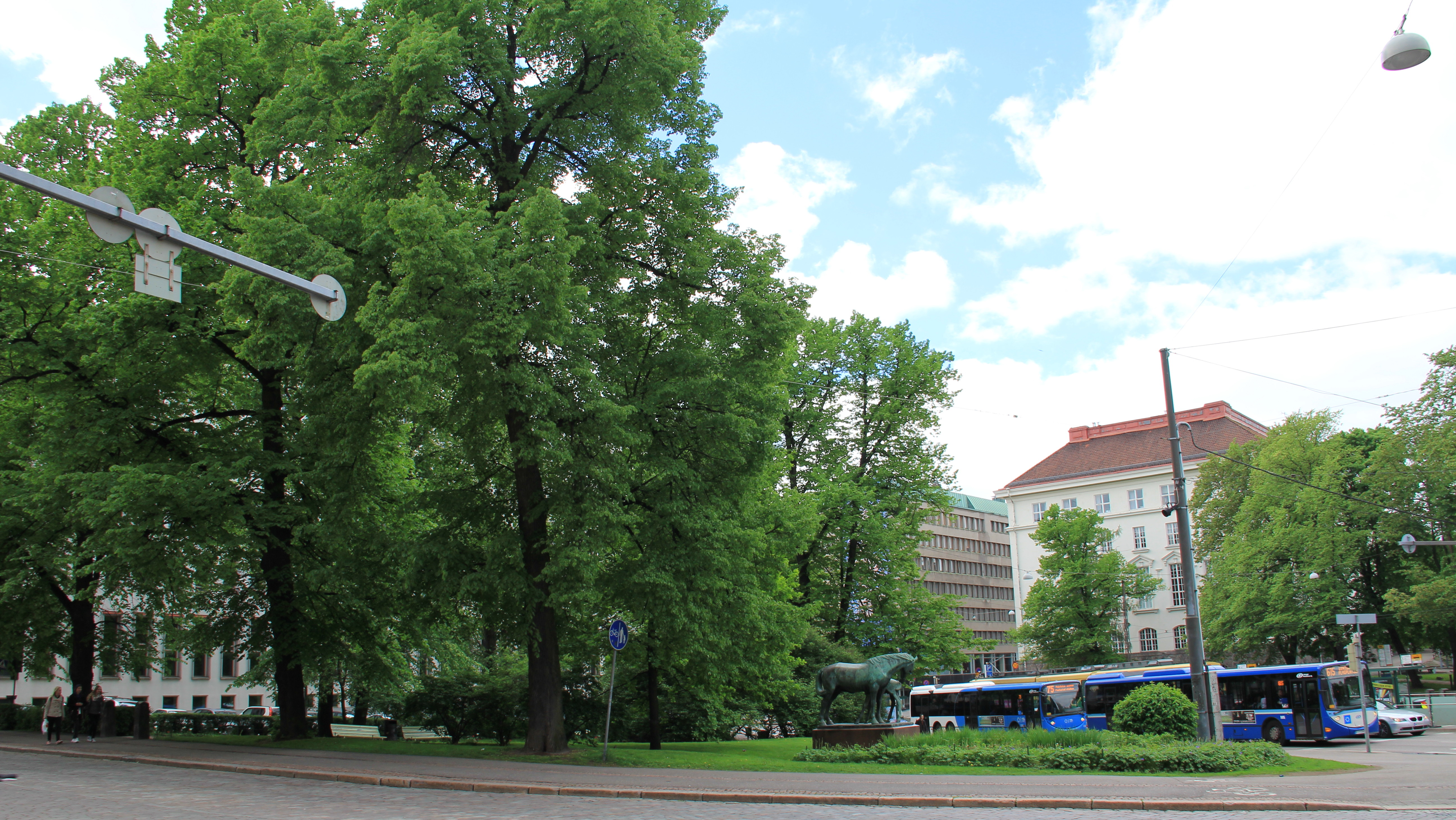
Maternal love, 1928, Helsinki

=== Literary works ===
In addition to his visual art, Cedercreutz was a published author. Many of his books were illustrated with his own silhouettes.

- Typer. I. Kända (in Swedish). 1917.
- Pä bäda sidor om fronten (in Swedish). 1918.
- Molemmin puolin rintamaa (in Finnish). 1918.
- Blomstervägen (in Swedish). 1919.
- Typer. II. Okända (in Swedish). 1919.
- Maata ja ilmaa (in Finnish). 1920.
- Starka människor (in Swedish). 1920.
- I ödets gunga (in Swedish). 1922.
- Yksinäisyyttä ja ihmisvilinää. Muistelmia (in Finnish). 1939.
- Det spanska blodet. (Louise Ahlström) Glimtar ur en familjekrönika (in Swedish). 1942.
- När det skymmer. Dikter (in Swedish). 1945.
- Cirkusliv i Norden (in Swedish). 1946.
