= C. J. von Heideken =

Swedish architect (1832–1888)

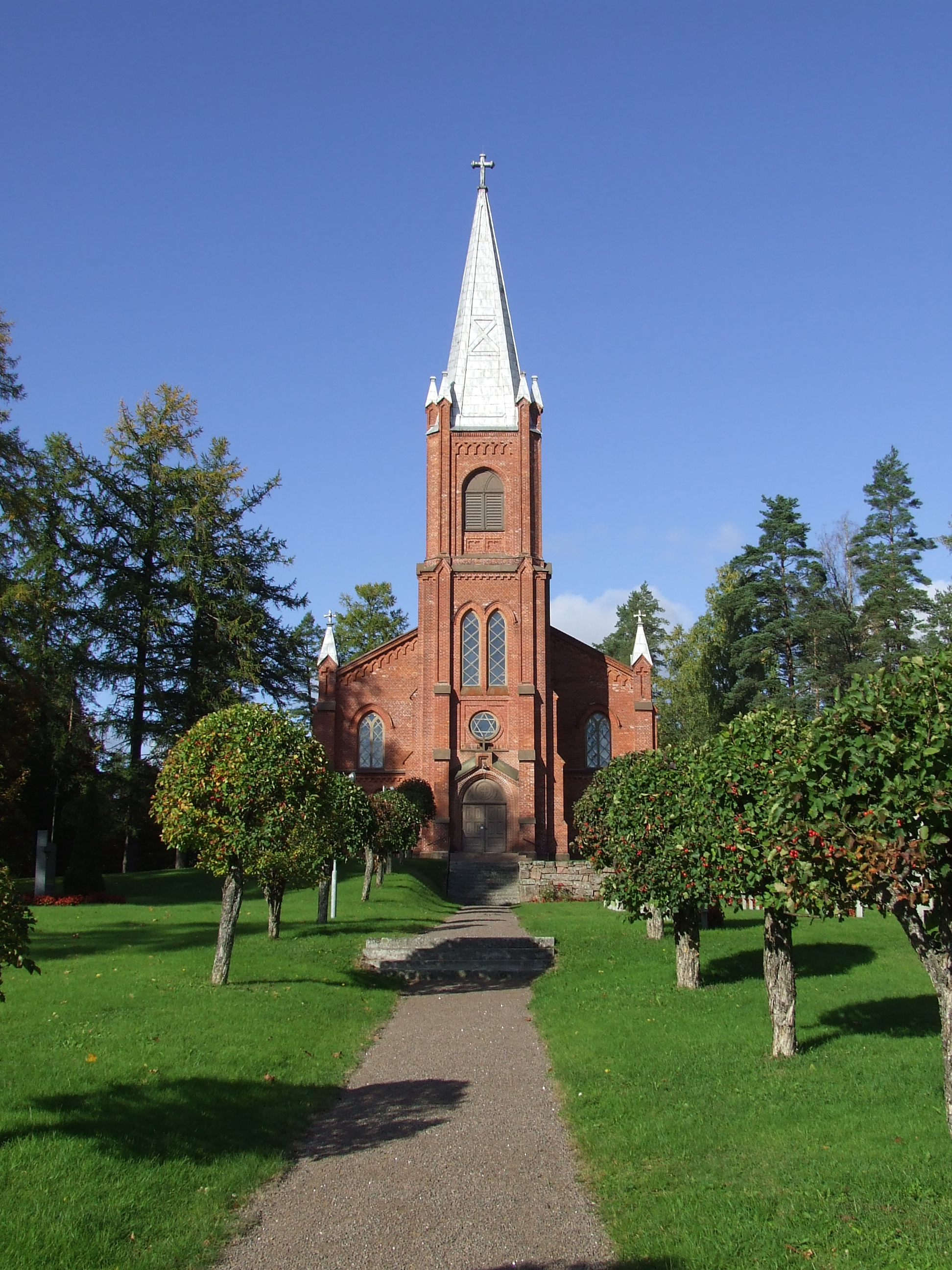
Sippola Church (1879)

Carl Johan von Heideken (23 August 1832 – 27 March 1888) was a Swedish architect who made his career in Finland.

== Biography ==
He was born in Stockholm, Sweden. After graduating from the Royal Swedish Academy of Fine Arts in Stockholm, von Heideken moved to Finland. He worked as the city architect of Pori from 1853 to 1853, after which he moved to Helsinki and lived there for seven years. In 1865, he was selected the city architect of Turku. After 1868, he worked as the architect of Turku and Pori Province. Heideken had a strong influence in rebuilding the city of Pori after the great fire of 1852, where he worked within the urban plan designed by Swedish architect Georg Theodor Chiewitz (1815–1862).

He died at Turku, Finland in 1888.

== Selected works ==
- Hotel Otava - (1857)
- Pori Weigh House (Pori Art Museum - 1860)
- Central Pori Church - (1863)
- Saksalainen Church of Helsinki - (1864)
- Kauvatsa Church, Kokemäki - (1870)
- Sippola Church, Kouvola - (1879)
