= Georg Theodor Chiewitz =

Swedish architect and engineer

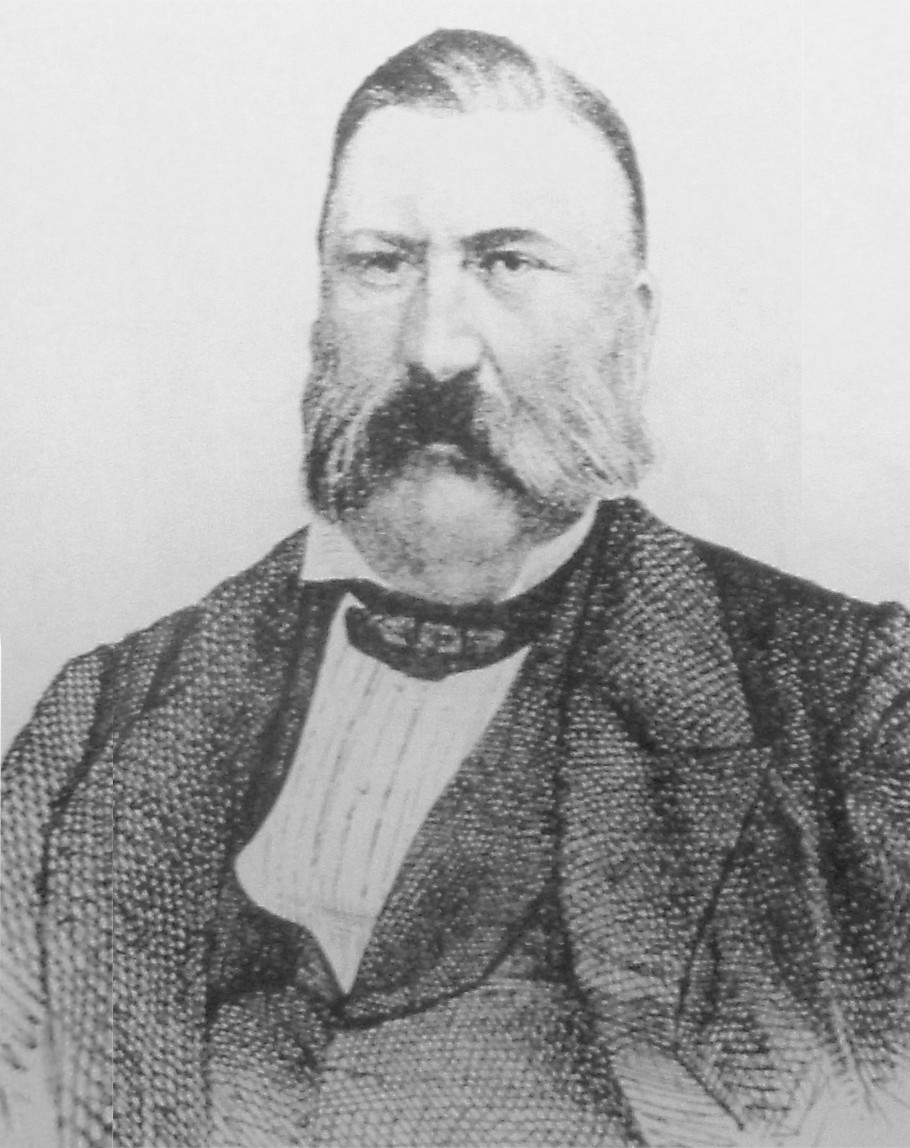
- Born: 5 October 1815; Stockholm, Sweden
- Died: 28 December 1862 (aged 47); Turku, Finland
- Occupation: Architect
- Buildings: Central Pori Church; Swedish Theatre; Ritarihuone
- Projects: Blackamoor Bridge; Pori city plan Mariehamn city plan

Georg Theodor Policron Chiewitz (5 October 1815 – 28 December 1862) was a Swedish architect and engineer. Due to financial problems he moved to Finland in 1851, where Chiewitz spent the rest of his career.

== Career ==
Chiewitz graduated from the Royal Institute of Technology in 1829 and later from the Royal Swedish Academy of Arts. From 1837–1838, he worked as an assistant for inventor John Ericsson in London and in 1839 for architect César Daly in Paris. In 1840, Chiewitz returned to Stockholm having businesses on railroad and bridge construction. In 1851, he went bankrupt and moved to Finland. From 1852–1860, Chiewitz was the regional architect of Turku and Pori Province and 1860–1862 the city architect of Turku.

== Works ==
Chiewitz was the favourite architect of King Oscar I of Sweden. He designed several structures for Haga Park and the gardens of Ulriksdal Palace in Solna and Tullgarn Palace in Södertälje. Most important works are the Blackamoor Bridge in Ulriksdal Palace and Oscar I's Orangery in the garden of Tullgarn Palace.

His best known works in Finland are the Central Pori Church, House of Nobility (Ritarihuone) and the Swedish Theatre of Helsinki. Chiewitz was also known of his city planning. His most significant work is the Pori city plan as the town was rebuilt after the great fire of 1852. The town of Mariehamn in Åland was established in 1861 by Chiewitz's planning.

== Famous works ==
=== Sweden ===
- Blackamoor Bridge, Solna (1845)
- Folckerska huset, Stockholm (1848)
- Jernbron, Uppsala (1848)
- Old Djurgårdsbron, Stockholm (1849)
- Oscar I's Orangery, Södertälje (1854)

=== Finland ===
- Pori city plan (1852)
- Mariehamn city plan (1855)
- Uusikaupunki city plan (1856)
- Park of the St. Henry's Chapel, Kokemäki (1857)
- Central Pori Church (1859–1863)
- Swedish Theatre, Helsinki (1860)
- Ritarihuone, Helsinki (1862)
- Loviisa Church, Loviisa (1862–1865)

== Gallery ==
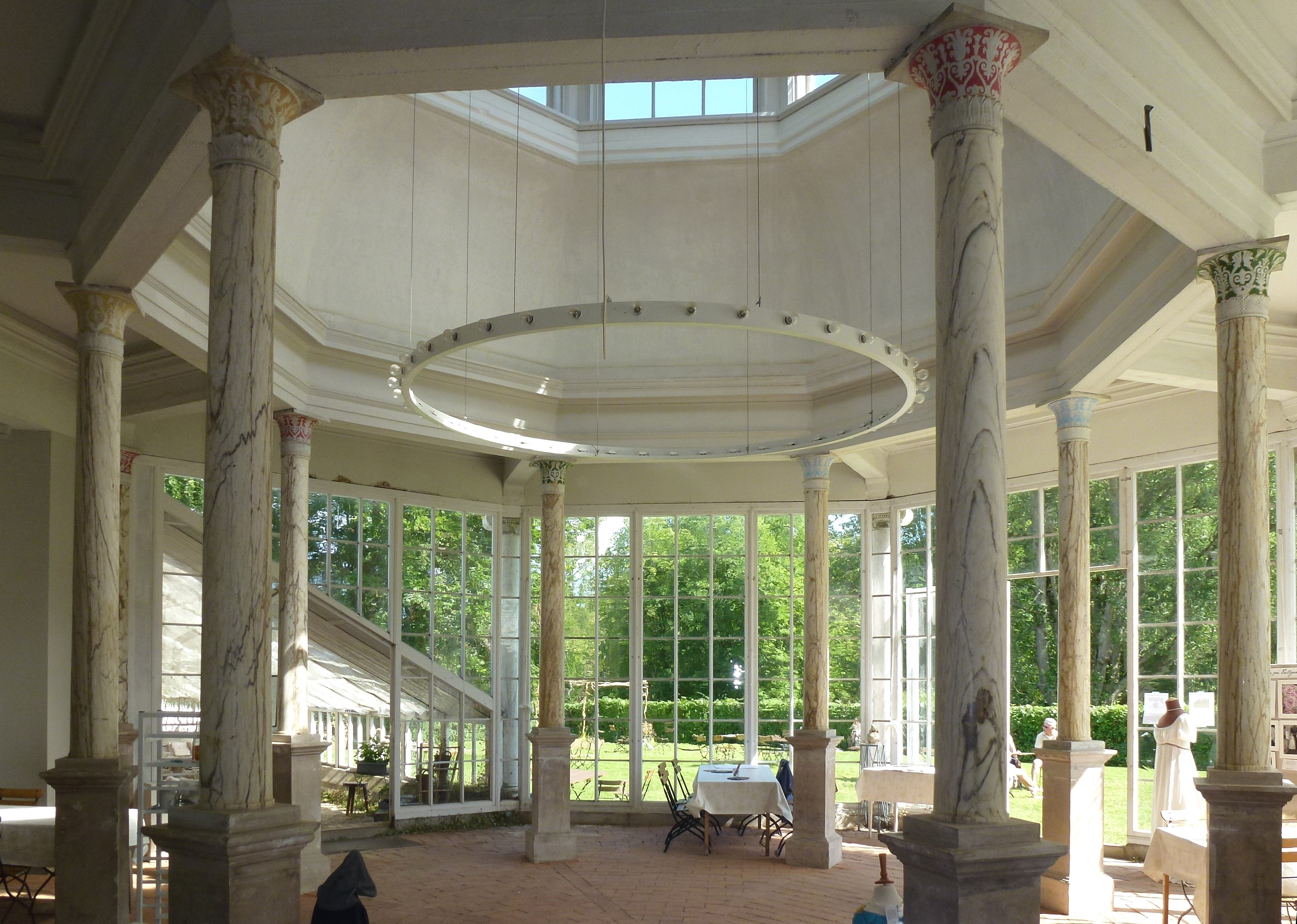
Oscar I:s Orangery, Södertälje (1854)

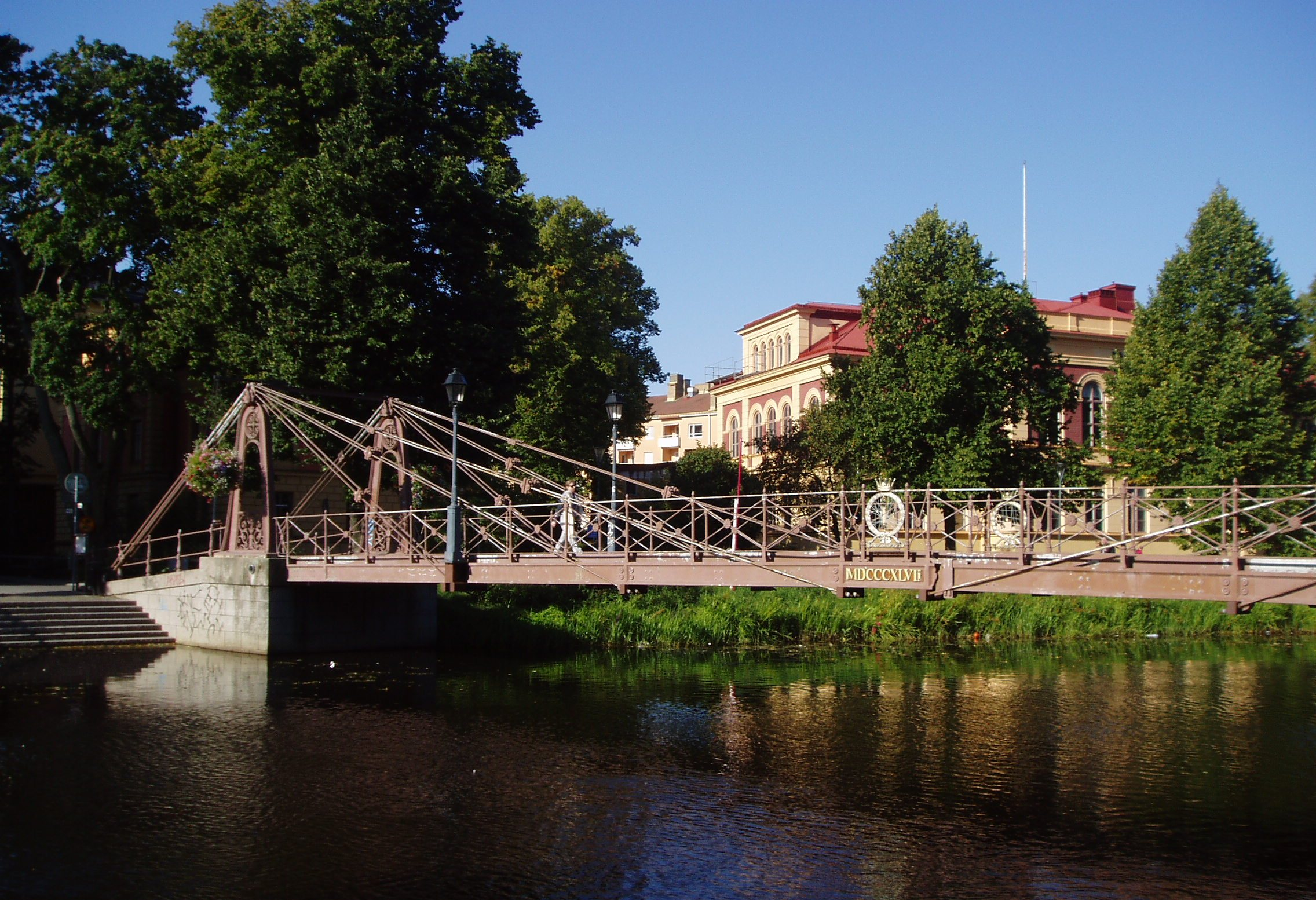
Jernbron, Uppsala (1848)

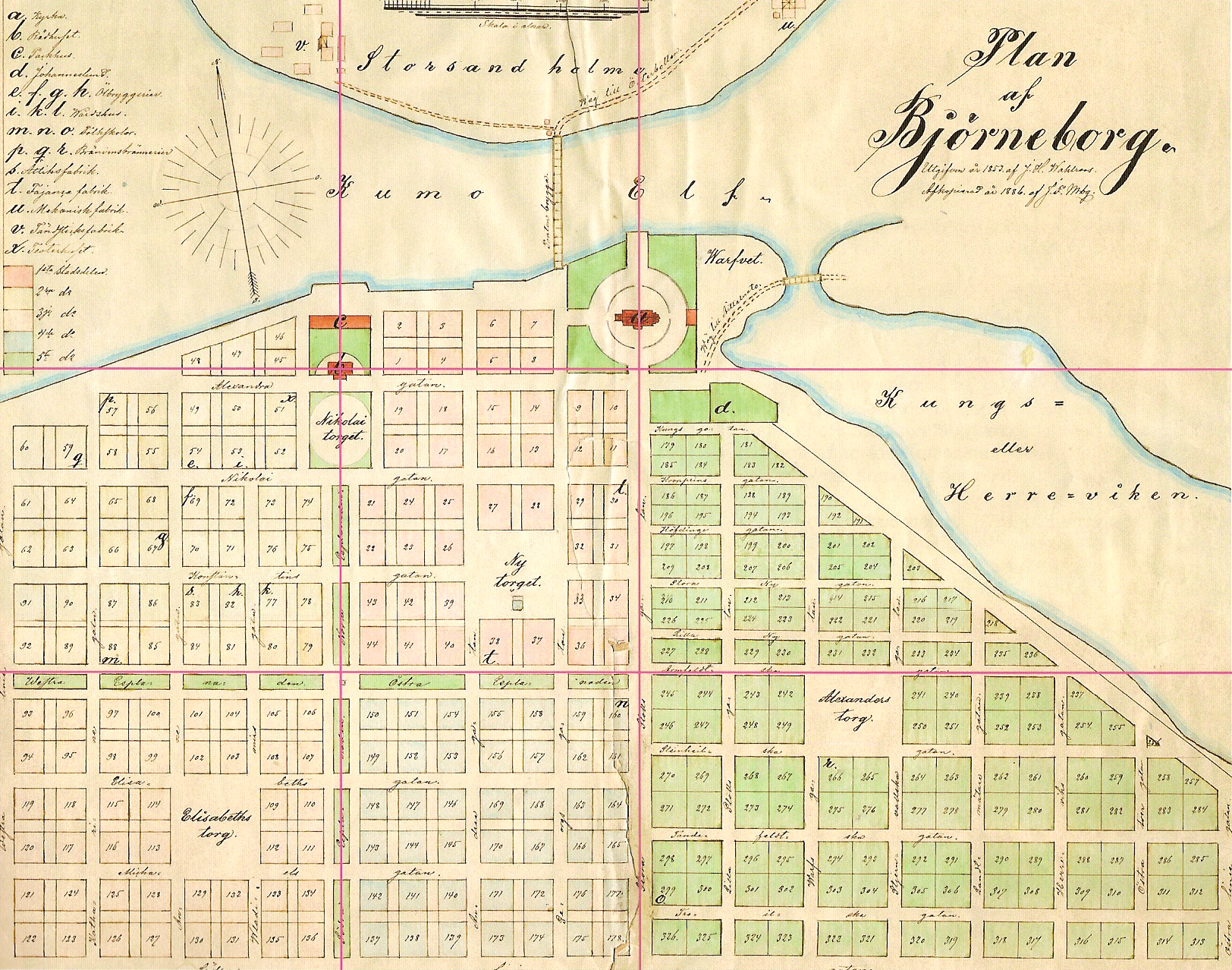
Pori city plan (1852)

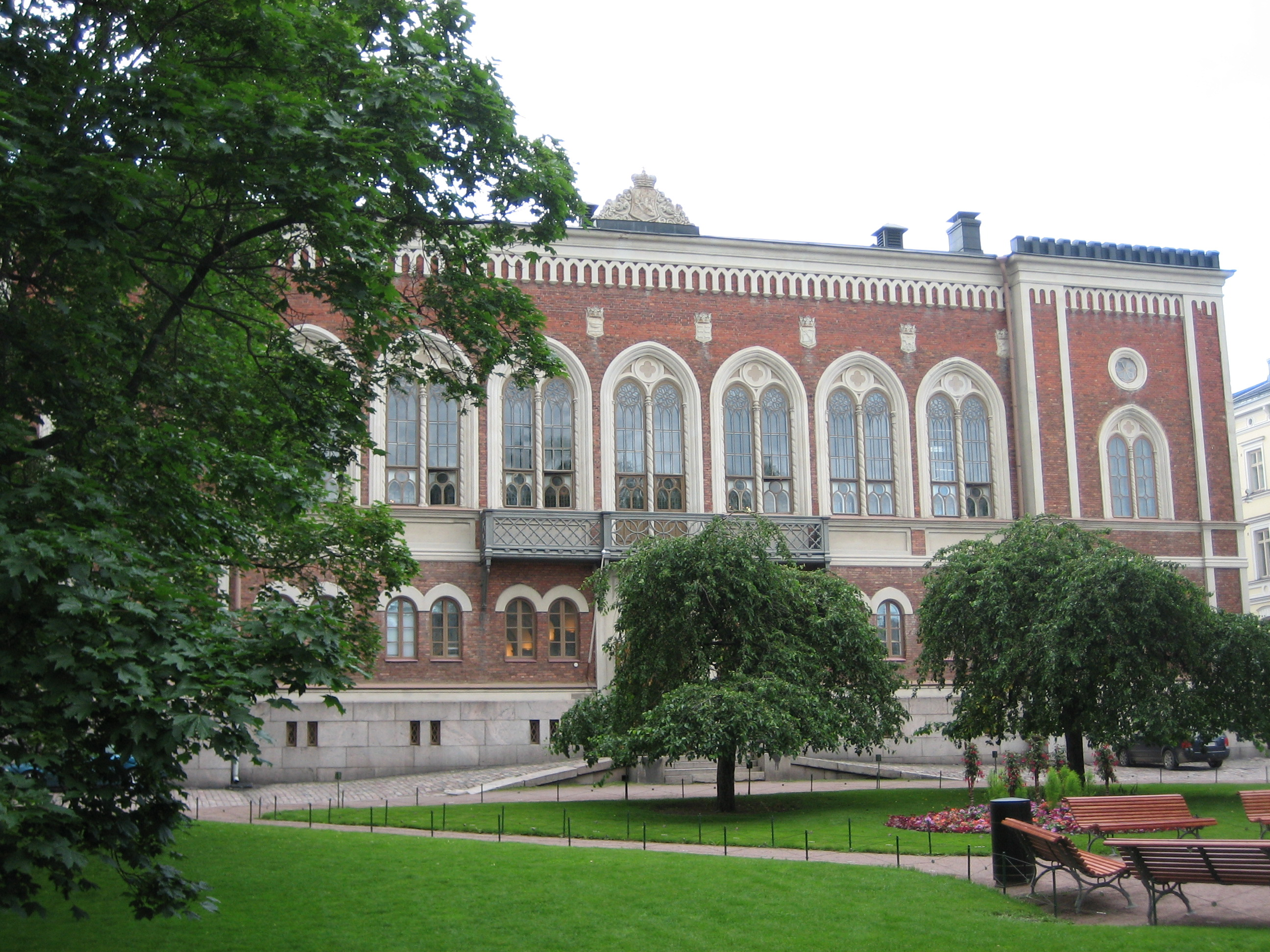
House of Nobility, Helsinki (1862)

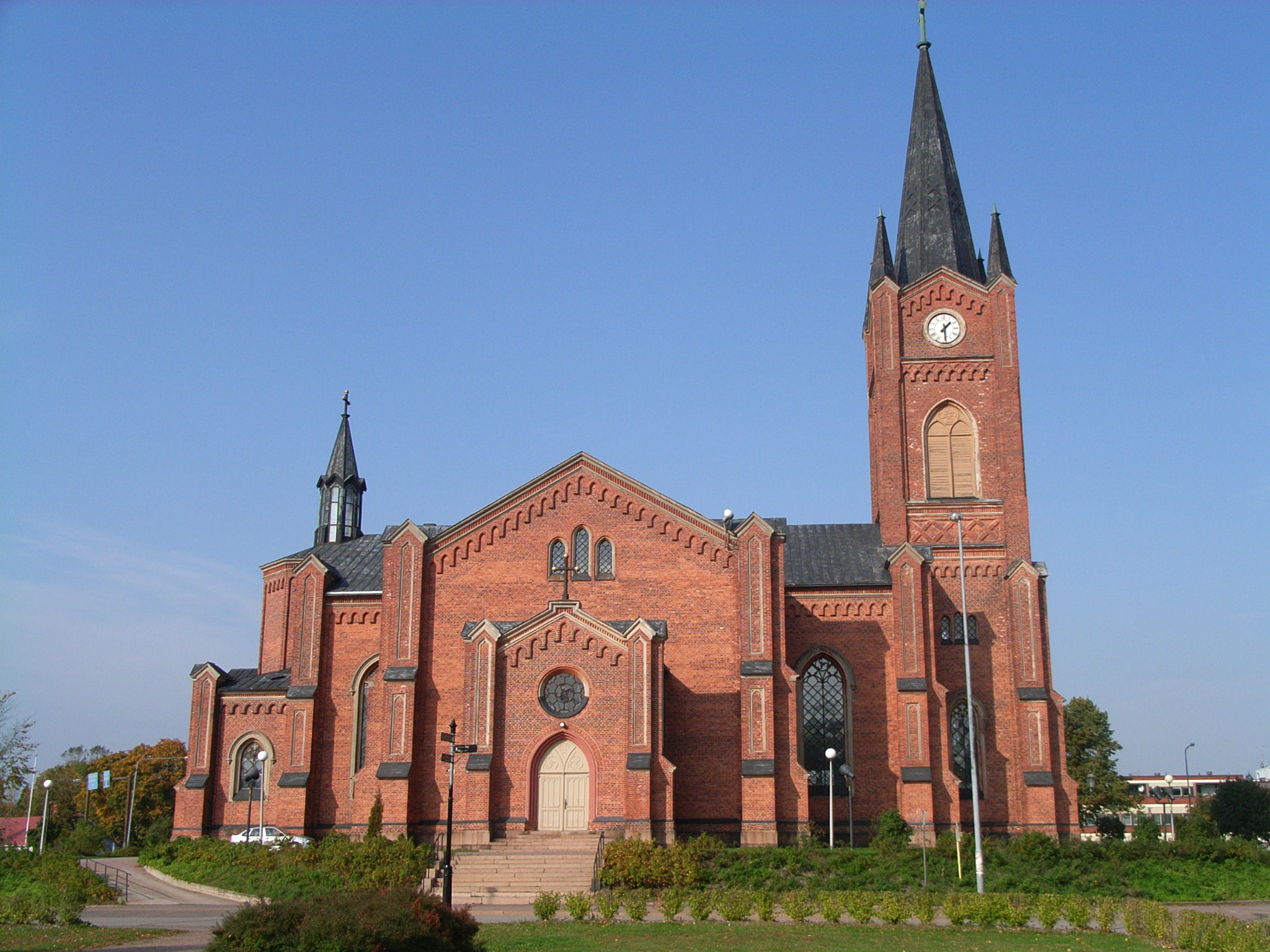
Loviisa Church (1865)
