= Central Pori Church =

- Keski-Porin kirkko Swedish: Centrala Björneborgs kyrka
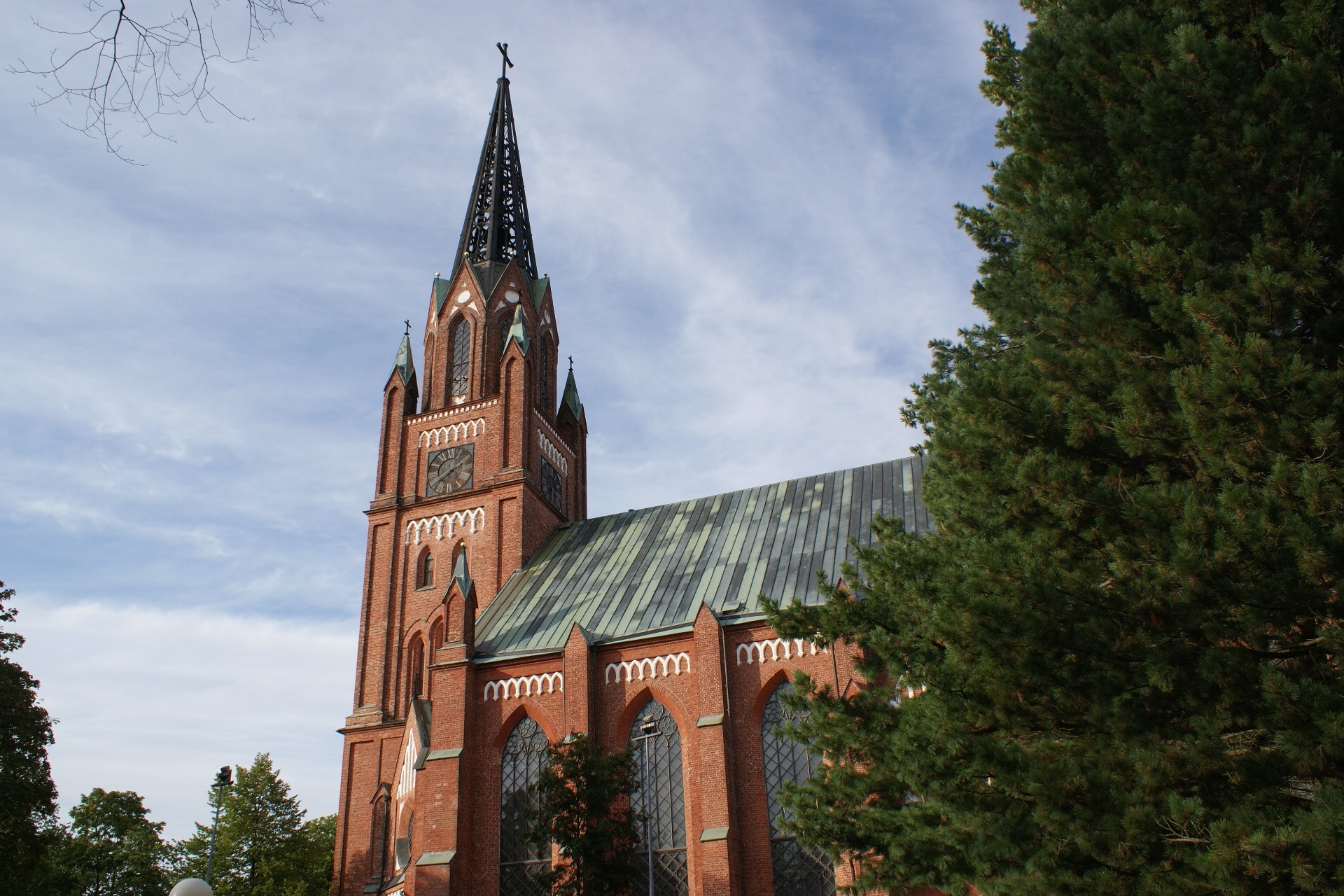
- Central Pori Church
- 61°29′21″N 021°48′05″E
- Location: Pori
- Country: Finland
- Denomination: Lutheran
- Website: www.porievl.fi/keski-porin-kirkko

Architecture
- Architect(s): Carl Johan von Heideken, Georg Theodor Chiewitz
- Style: Gothic Revival
- Groundbreaking: 1859
- Completed: 1863

Specifications
- Capacity: 1,700

Administration
- Diocese: Turku

The Central Pori Church (Finnish: Keski-Porin kirkko) is a church in Gothic Revival style in the centre of the city of Pori, Western Finland. It is the largest church in region of Satakunta, and one of the largest in Finland. The church is also the main church of Pori.

The church was built in between 1859 and 1863, when it was inaugurated. It is known for its unique church tower, which is made of cast iron. The tower is 72 metres (236 ft) tall. The church was designed by C. T. von Chiewitz and C.J. von Heideken. Glass paintings in the church are made by Magnus Enckell.

The church and parks of Central Pori are part of the Pori National Urban Park, established in 2002. It is also part of the same complex as the Kokemäenjoki riverfront districts, the so-called Kivi-Pori, which the National Board of Antiquities has designated as a nationally significant built cultural environment. Today the Central Pori Church is famous for its pipe organ, built by Paschen Kiel Orgelbau in 2007. The church is also the main concert venue of the annual Pori Organ festival.
