= Field church service =

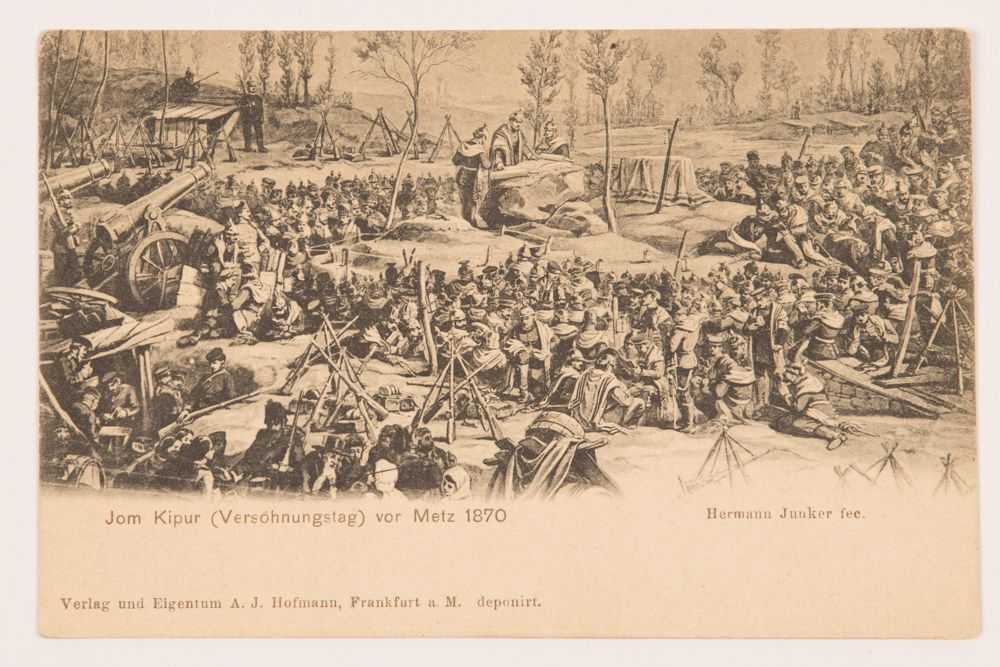
The open-air church service on Yom Kippur in front of Metz during the Franco-Prussian War of 1870. Postcard in the collection of the Jewish Museum of Switzerland.

The term "Feldgottesdienst" (also called "Feldmesse" in Roman Catholic usage) refers to a church service held outdoors. The designation originates from the military, where masses were celebrated on the field; today, church services held outdoors by civilian congregations (for example, on Ascension Day or during marksmen´s festivals) are also referred to as open-air church services or "Feldgottesdienste".

Although field church service seems similar to drumhead service as forms of Christian military worship, there are meaningful differences. Drumhead service is a special service traditionally held in a military context where an improvised altar is created by stacking drums on top of each other and covering them with a cloth or flag. A field church service is not limited to such a ritual, which offers more leeway in its implementation.

Open air preaching, on the other hand, refers more to the practice of people with missionary intentions who visit public places outdoors, such as market squares, to proclaim religious messages.

== History ==
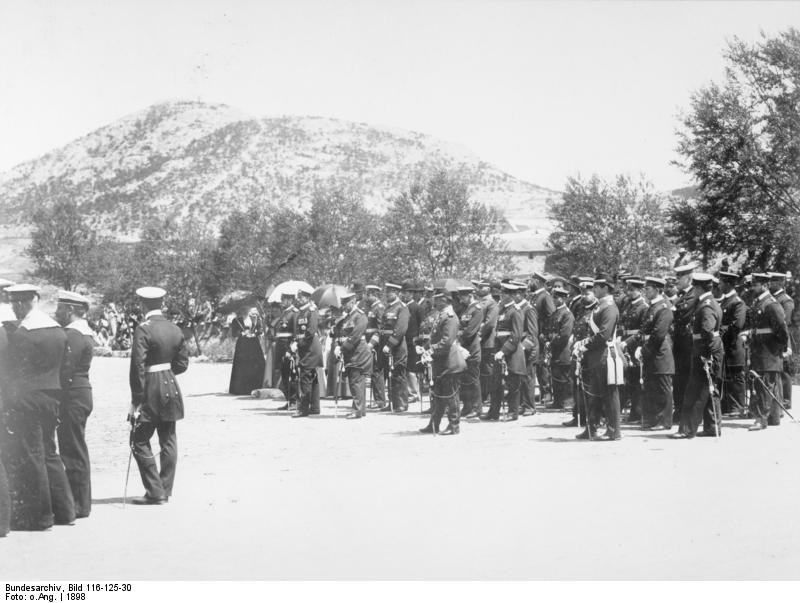
Field church service with Henry of Prussia 1898

Open-air church services/ Masses (sub divo) were already an integral part of military chaplaincy during the Carolingian era and were explicitly permitted in 742 by the Concilium Germanicum under the leadership of Boniface. Military services in garrison churches began with the emergence of dedicated military churches in the 19th century.

“Feldgottesdienste” (field church services) have been an integral part of troop celebrations during wartime since the early 19th century. They are documented during the Second Schleswig War (1864) and the Franco-Prussian War (1870–1871). At that time, in addition to Christian services, Jewish field church services were also held, such as for the highest Jewish holiday Yom Kippur.

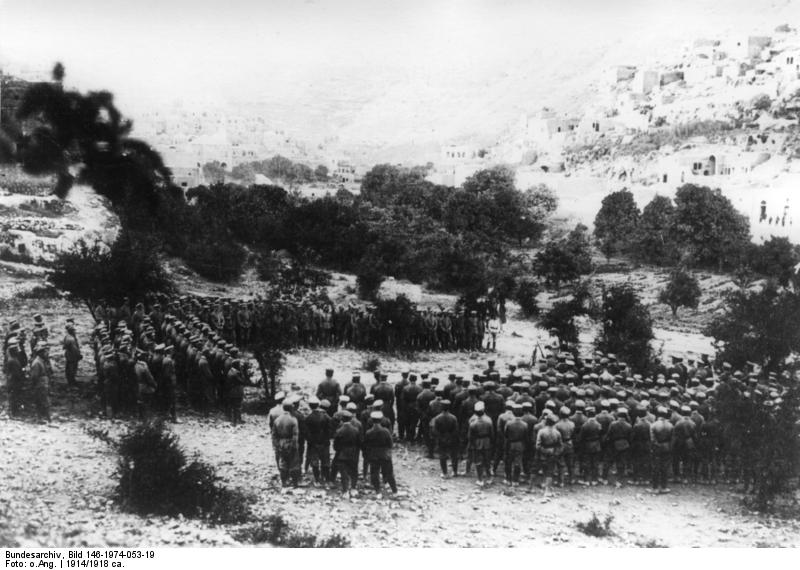
Field church service by Pastor Lüttichau in as-Salt, 1914

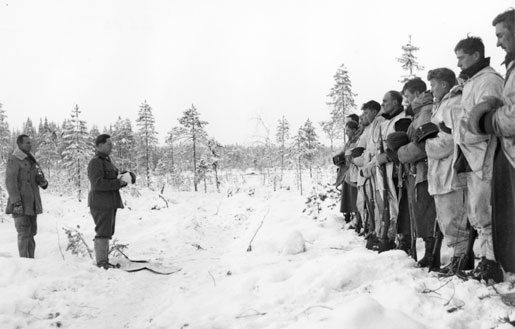
“The terror of Morocco”, Lt. Aarne Juutilainen's company. Christmas service in Kollaa (Finland) 1939.

During World War I, such services, especially when held in trenches or at Christmas, became formative experiences for many of the usually young participants. "Field church services were part of the daily life of soldiers of both Christian denominations and the Jewish religion."

As part of a field service, on October 2, 1935, the burial of the deceased Reich President Paul von Hindenburg took place at the Tannenberg memorial site. While the Nazis initially took advantage of numerous opportunities for field church services at the beginning of their rule, this attitude changed during World War II. For example, Hermann Göring, as commander-in-chief of the Luftwaffe, issued a decree on April 13, 1940, stating that "field church services should only be held if demand indicated a need for them. For soldiers who do not participate in the field church service, no duty should be assigned during that time."

A particular feature of field church services was that, during wartime, they were held without denominational separation for a specific military unit (regiment, division, or army corps), often in collaboration between the Catholic and Protestant field chaplains. During the war, military services were often held in the local churches of the occupied hinterlands.

In World War II, the military bishop of the Wehrmacht allowed Catholic priests to use a textile "Antimensium" with sewn-in relics as a substitute for the liturgically required altar stone with embedded holy relics, as the base for the chalice and paten during Mass. This applied to both field services with the troops and private celebrations by individual soldiers who were priests.

== The current situation in military chaplaincy ==
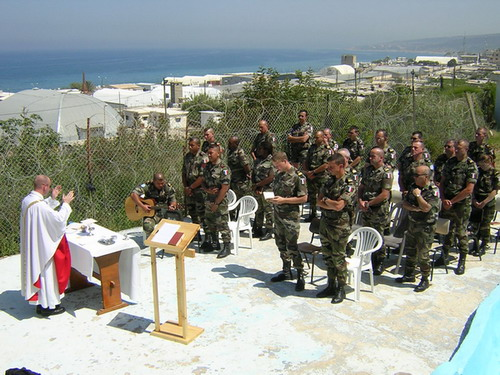
Holy Mass as a Catholic field church service in South Lebanon at Easter 2004

The soldiers attending the church service typically line up in a rectangle in front of the altar, while musicians or other participants stand in a semicircle behind the altar. Field uniforms are worn, even the military chaplain is wearing his uniform. Field church services are often held as purely word-based services. When appropriate, this service is ecumenical and aimed at soldiers of all denominations. It can be held by a Catholic and/or Protestant military chaplain. For this purpose, the soldier's prayer book is used, which contains songs and prayers. The military chaplain celebrates the service, while the tambourines musically accompany the proceedings at the beginning, after the blessing, and at the end. For a larger number of participants, a music corps takes over the musical accompaniment, thereby replacing the organ. The altar is portable and usually made of wood; it is adorned with an altar cloth but without further(floral) decorations, and is provided with the necessary liturgical instruments and books.

If a Catholic Mass is held, the proper law of canon law regarding the sacraments must be observed. The Catholic military bishop is generally allowed to permit field services in military installations; if they take place outside, he must request permission from the respective local bishop. In a Catholic Mass, soldiers usually perform the role of altar servers without special clothing. The celebrant wears a stole in the liturgical color over his field uniform.
