= Kirkkojärvi =

Kirkkojärvi is a common name of lakes in Finland. It may refer to:

- Kirkkojärvi (Espoo), a suburb and former lake in Espoo municipality, Southern Finland
- Kirkkojärvi (Nurmijärvi), a lake in Nurmijärvi municipality, Finland, better known as Nurmijärvi
- Kirkkojärvi (Salo), a lake in Salo, Finland
- Mahnalanselkä – Kirkkojärvi, a lake in Hämeenkyrö municipality, Western Finland
- Polyany, Leningrad Oblast, a lake in Russia, (Finnish name Muolaan Kirkkojärvi)
