= Diocese of Lapua =

Diocese of Lapua Lapuan hiippakunta
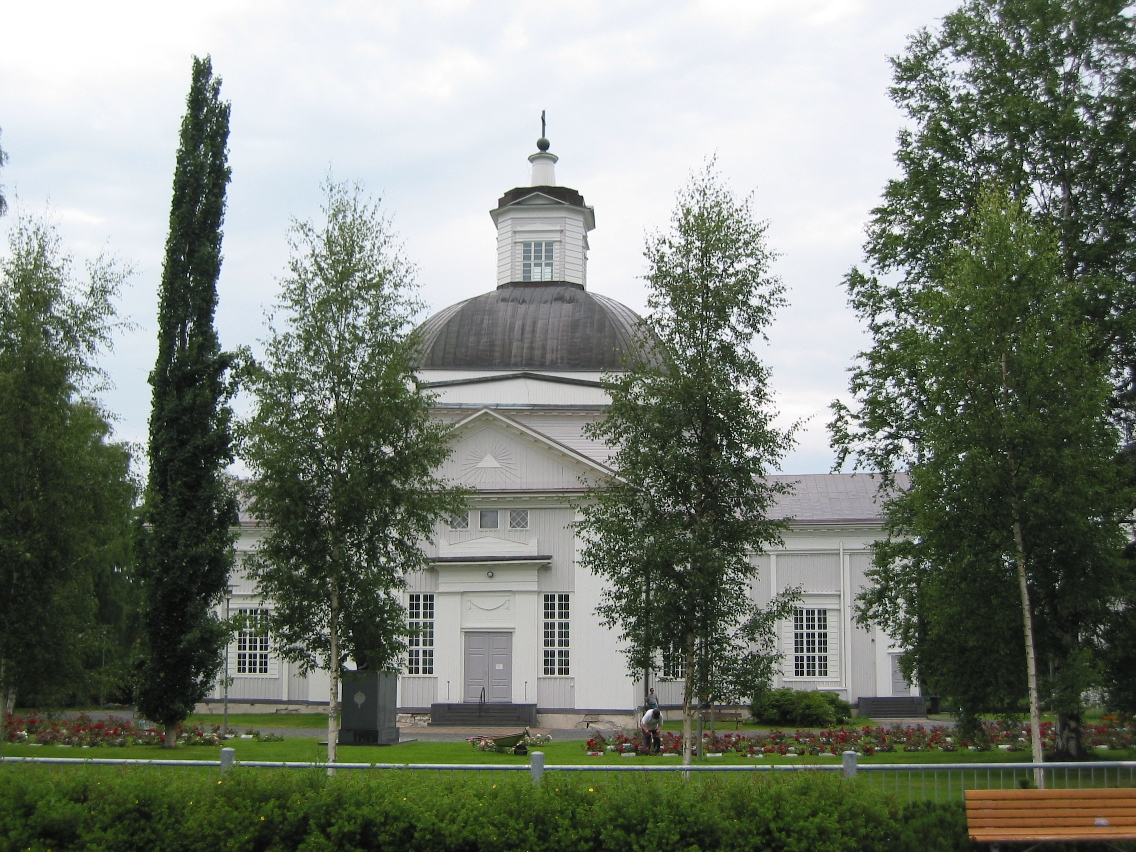

- Coat of arms

Location
- Country: Finland
- Ecclesiastical province: Turku & Finland
- Metropolitan: Archbishop of Turku & Finland

Statistics
- Parishes: 49
- Members: 406000

Information
- Denomination: Evangelical Lutheran Church of Finland
- Established: 1956
- Cathedral: Lapua Cathedral

Current leadership
- Bishop: Matti Salomäki
- Metropolitan Archbishop: Tapio Luoma

Website
- www.lapuanhiippakunta.fi

The Diocese of Lapua (Finnish: Lapuan hiippakunta, Swedish: Lappo stift) is one of nine dioceses within the Evangelical Lutheran Church of Finland. The diocese was founded in 1956.

The diocese attained national attention in September 2015, when Finnish media reported that the diocese had purchased a luxury penthouse apartment for the bishop's official residence. Due to the controversy, hundreds of Finns resigned from the church during the days following the media exposure.

== Bishops of Lapua ==
- Eero Lehtinen 1956–1974
- Yrjö Sariola 1974–1995
- Jorma Laulaja 1995–2004
- Simo Peura 2004–2022
- Matti Salomäki 2022–

== See also ==
- Evangelical Lutheran Church of Finland
