= Mikko Heikka =

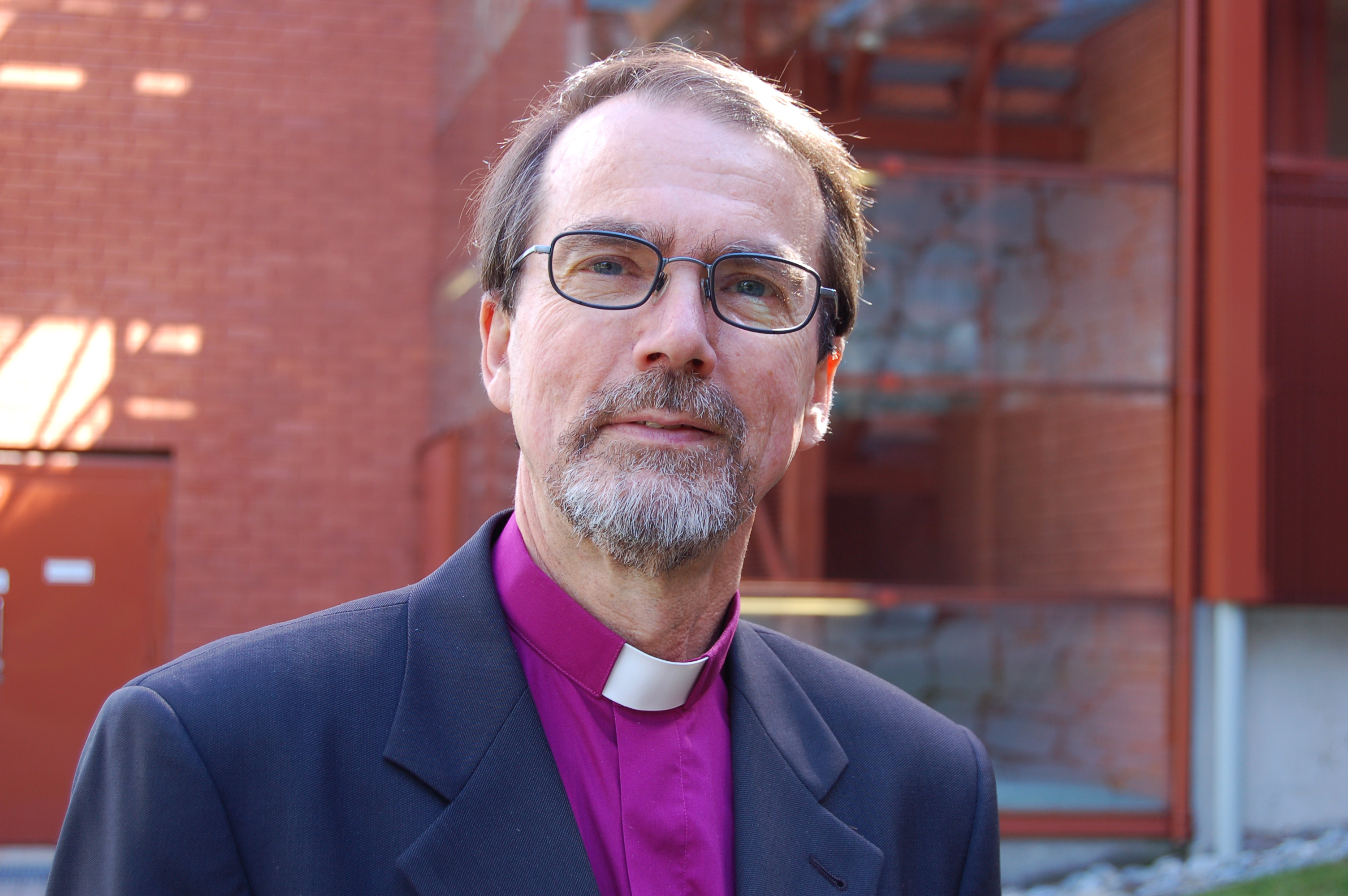
Mikko Heikka

Mikko Esa Juhani Heikka (born 19 September 1944 in Ylitornio) is a Finnish former bishop of the Evangelic Lutheran Church. He was ordained into priesthood in 1968 and became a Doctor of Theology from the University of Helsinki in 1983. He was appointed the first Bishop of Espoo in 2004. He is married with four adult children; Henrikki, Taneli, Sakari and Rebekka.

The bishop's hobbies include music; he has mentioned he loves baroque music. He also constructs buildings.

Religious titles
First	Bishop of Espoo; 2004 – 2011	Succeeded by Tapio Luoma
