= Espoon keskus =

Espoon keskus Esbo centrum
- District of Espoo
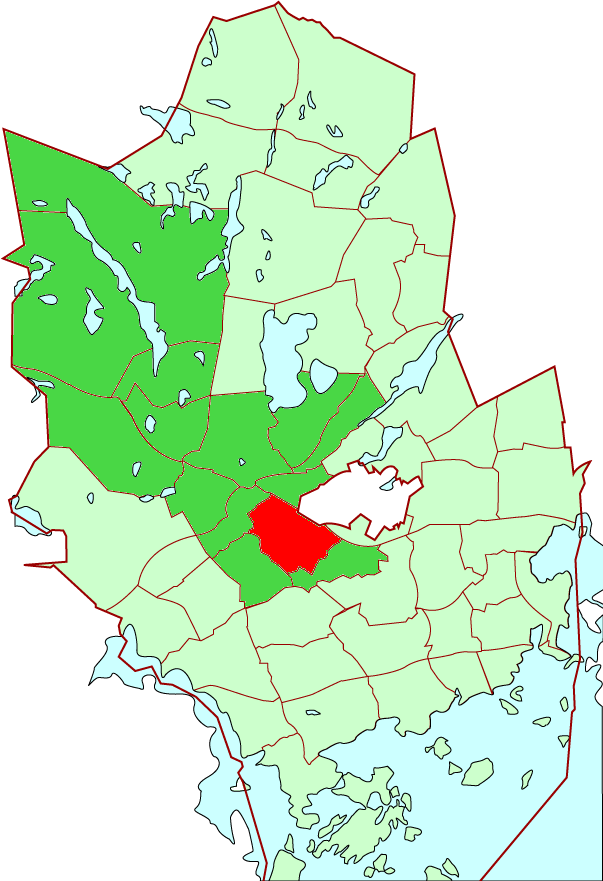
- Location of Espoon keskus within Espoo
- Coordinates: 60.204°N 24.654°E
- Country: Finland
- Municipality: Espoo
- Region: Uusimaa
- Sub-region: Greater Helsinki
- Main District: Vanha-Espoo
- Inner District(s): Kirkkojärvi, Suvela, Tuomarila

Population (2006)
  - Total: 15,827

Languages
  - Finnish: 79.7 %
  - Swedish: 8.1 %
  - Other: 12.2 %
- Jobs: 5,390

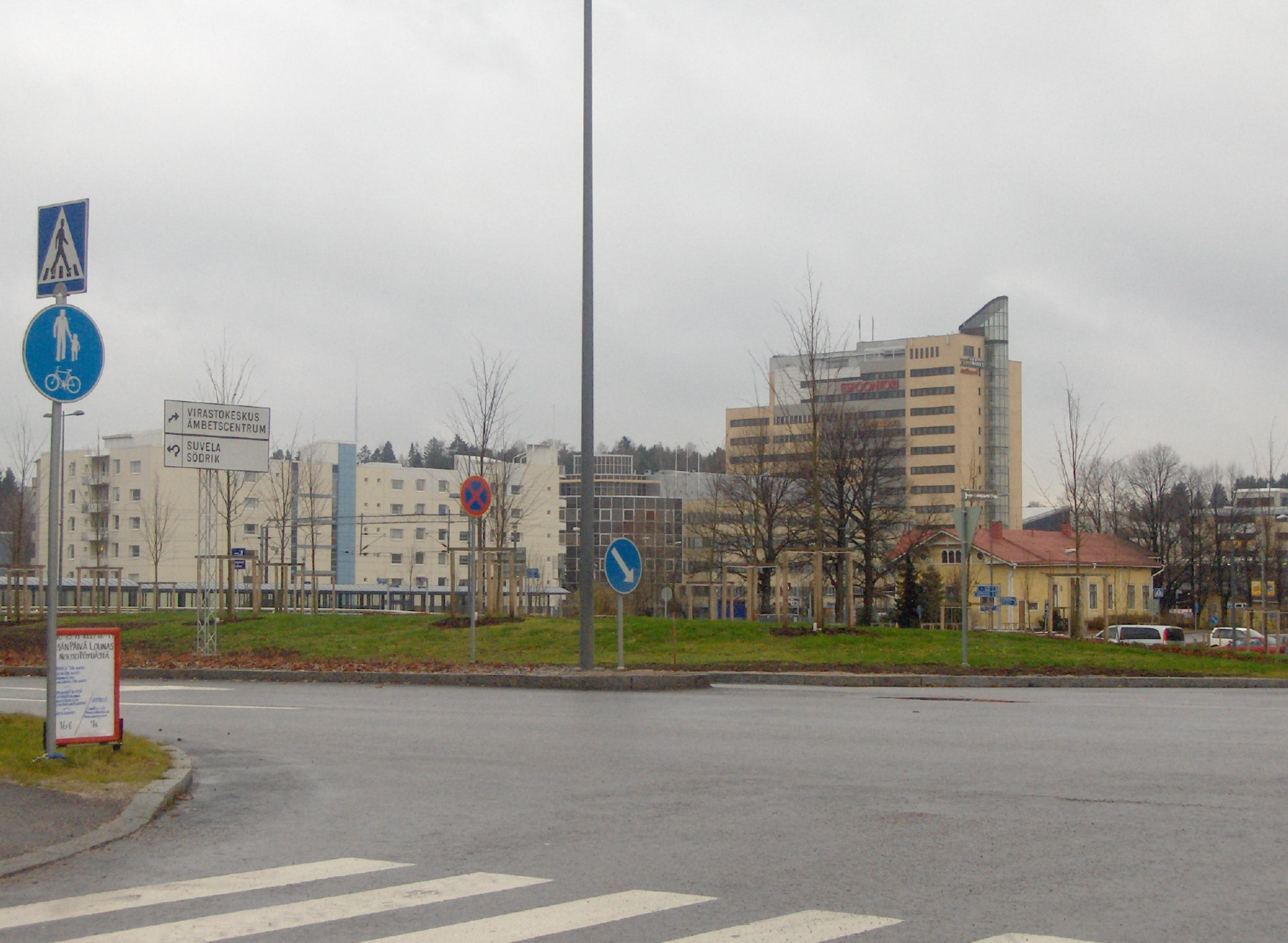
Espoontori, a shopping centre, can be seen in the distance

Espoon keskus (Finnish for Espoo Centre, Swedish: Esbo centrum) is the central district of Espoo, the second biggest city of Finland and the administrative centre with the city hall of Espoo. The areas of Kiltakallio, Kirkkojärvi, Saarniraivio, Suna, Suvela and Tuomarila belong to Espoon keskus. To the east, Espoon keskus borders the city of Kauniainen, an enclave within the city of Espoo.

== History ==
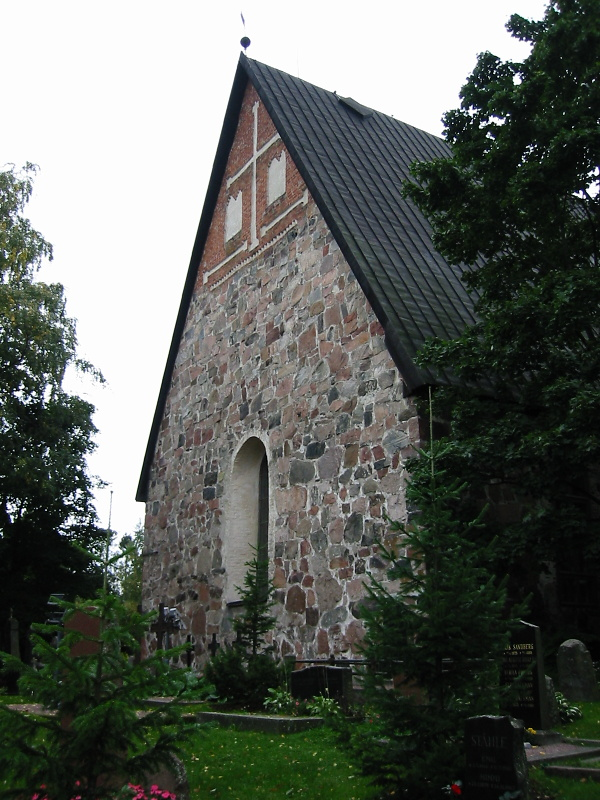
Espoo Cathedral

Archaeological evidence shows that the area which Espoon keskus dominates today was inhabited several thousands of years ago. The area has had a permanent settlement for at least 700–800 years.

The name Espoon keskus dates back to the 1970s, and before that the area was called Espoon kylä (Esbo by in Swedish). The village consisted of five larger estates (that have later given their names to some areas that belong to Espoon keskus): Doms (Tuomarila), Jofs (Jouppi), Kirsti (Kirstinmäki), Dahl and Suna. The oldest parts of the Cathedral of Espoo date back to the 1480s. Before that there was a wooden church on the site. The first kansakoulu (elementary school) of Espoo, Lagstads folkskola, was opened in 1873. In the beginning of the 20th century, Espoon keskus was also called Muurala, which is the modern name of a district of Espoo, Muurala, located northwest of Espoon keskus. However, "Muurala" might replace the name of Espoon keskus as part of the efforts to improve the reputation of the area.

== See also ==
- Districts of Espoo
