= Tapio Luoma =

Finnish prelate (born 1962)

The Most Reverend Tapio Luoma
- Archbishop of Turku and Finland
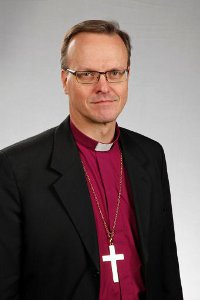
- Luoma in 2013
- Church: Evangelical Lutheran Church of Finland
- Elected: 2018
- Installed: 1 June 2018
- Predecessor: Kari Mäkinen

Orders
- Consecration: 1 February 2012 by Kari Mäkinen

Personal details
- Born: 15 June 1962 (age 63) Kurikka, Finland

Tapio Juhani Luoma (born 15 June 1962) is a Finnish prelate, who has been the Archbishop of Turku and Finland and Primate of the Evangelical Lutheran Church of Finland since 1 June 2018.

== Biography ==
Born in Kurikka, Luoma was ordained priest in 1987. He acquired a doctorate in theology in 1999 with his dissertation concerning the relationship between theology and natural sciences. Luoma's dissertation is titled Incarnation and Physics: Natural Science in the Theology of Thomas F. Torrance and is published by Oxford University Press in 2002.

He has worked as a chaplain in Peräseinäjoki between 1987 and 1998, and in Ilmajoki between 1998 and 2002. In 2002, he moved to Seinäjoki as parish priest. He also served as Broadcaster of the Broadcasting Corporation between 1986 and 1987.

On 1 February 2012, he was consecrated as bishop of Espoo by Archbishop Kari Mäkinen and installed as bishop on 12 February in Espoo Cathedral. He was elected as Archbishop of the Evangelical Lutheran Church of Finland on 1 March 2018, and assumed office in June 2018 upon the retirement of Kari Mäkinen.

Luoma is a published author, having authored four books.

== Views ==
Earlier, Luoma did not support the church's blessing of same-sex unions and regarded marriage as solely between a man and a woman. The decision of the church assembly in May 2018 was also negative towards such unions.

However, Luoma's stance has since changed. He now hopes that the church would allow the blessing of same-sex couples for those priests who wish to perform it. According to Luoma, the change is inevitable. He has also supported a civic initiative banning conversion therapy. He has pointed out that homosexuality has not been considered a sin in the church's official statements for decades.

Luoma has also weighed in on the racism debate. According to him, racism is a sin in the Christian faith because human worth is not determined by mutual agreement among people but is given to individuals as beings created by God.

In October 2023, Luoma criticized the government program of Orpo's administration on his website, particularly emphasizing the elevation of work to excessively high esteem. He also defended the church's right to take a stand on societal issues.

== Honours and awards ==
- Commander Grand Cross of the Order of the Lion of Finland.

Titles in Lutheranism
| Preceded by Kari Mäkinen | Archbishop of Turku and Finland; 2018 – present | Incumbent |
| Preceded by Mikko Heikka | Bishop of Espoo; 2012 – 2018 | Succeeded by Kaisamari Hintikka |
