= Kaisamari Hintikka =

Finnish theologian

The Most Reverend Kaisamari Hintikka Bishop of Espoo
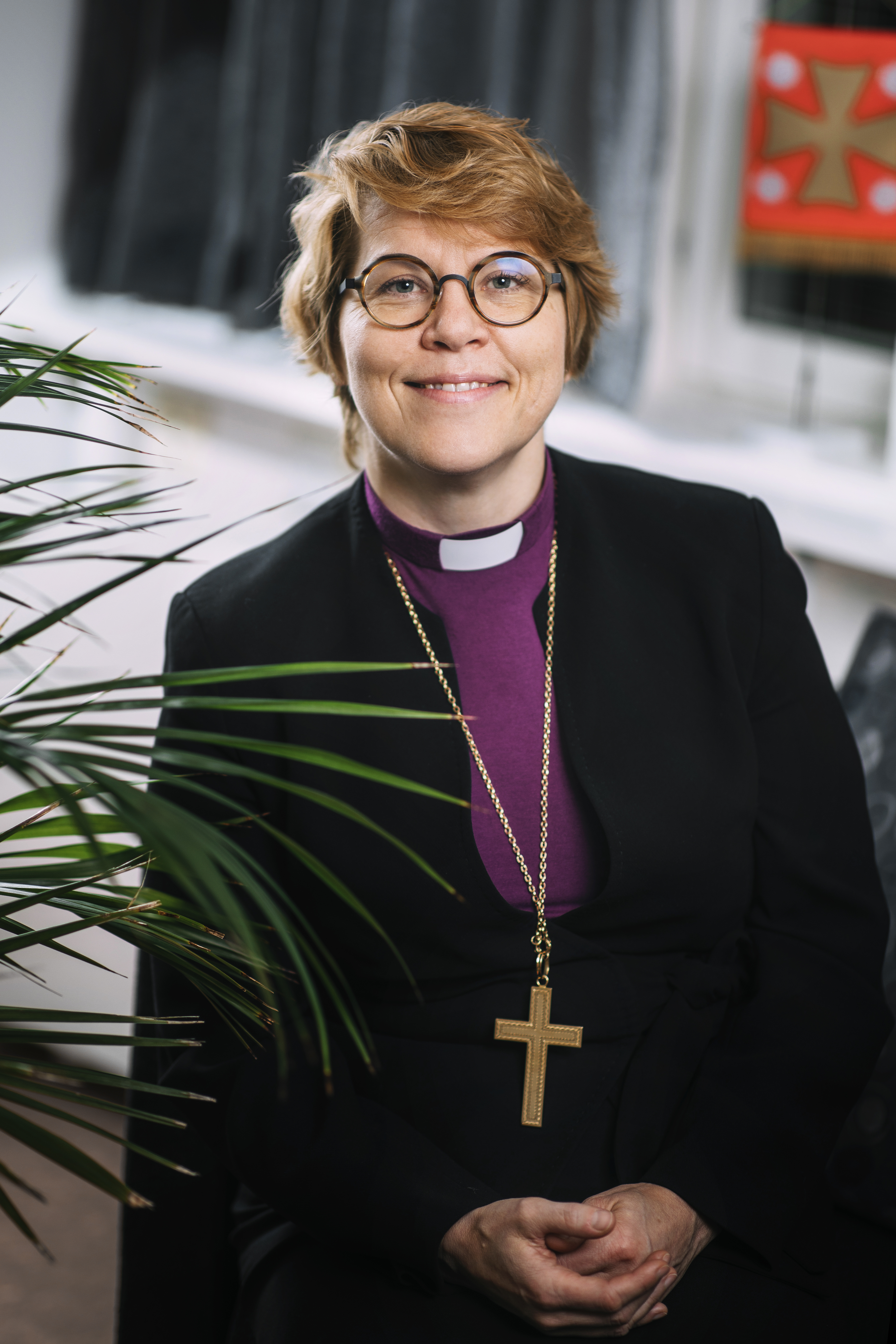
- Bishop Kaisamari Hintikka
- Church: Evangelical Lutheran Church of Finland
- Diocese: Diocese of Espoo
- Elected: 1 February 2019
- Predecessor: Tapio Luoma

Personal details
- Born: 27 June 1967 (age 58) Helsinki, Finland
- Education: University of Helsinki

Kaisamari Hintikka (born 27 June 1967) is a Finnish bishop in the Diocese of Espoo. Hintikka assumed the role of bishop on 1 February in 2019 with her inauguration taking place on 10 February 2019 at Espoo Cathedral. Hintikka is the third bishop of Espoo Diocese and the second woman to hold the position of a bishop in the Evangelical Lutheran Church of Finland, following bishop Irja Askola.

== Biography ==
Kaisamari Hintikka earned her master's degree in theology in 1993. She obtained her doctoral degree in theology from the University of Helsinki in 2001. Hintikka became a priest in the Diocese of Helsinki on 15 November 2009.

From 2011 to 2019, before assuming the role of bishop, Kaisamari Hintikka served in Geneva as the head of the Department for Theology and Public Witness and as the assistant secretary-general of ecumenical matters at the Lutheran World Federation. Additionally, she worked as a voluntary priest for the Geneva Finnish Parish from 2011 to 2018. In Finland, Hintikka held the position of specialist at the Foreign Department of the Church Council of the Evangelical Lutheran Church of Finland from 2002 to 2011. Between 1995 and 2002 she worked as a researcher at th University of Helsinki and as a teacher from 1994 to 2002, also serving as a substitute amanuensis in 1994.

Kaisamari Hintikka was awarder Commander of the Order of the White Rose of Finland on Finnish Independence Day on 6 December 2023.
