= Diocese of Espoo =

Lutheran diocese in Finland

Diocese of Espoo Espoon hiippakunta
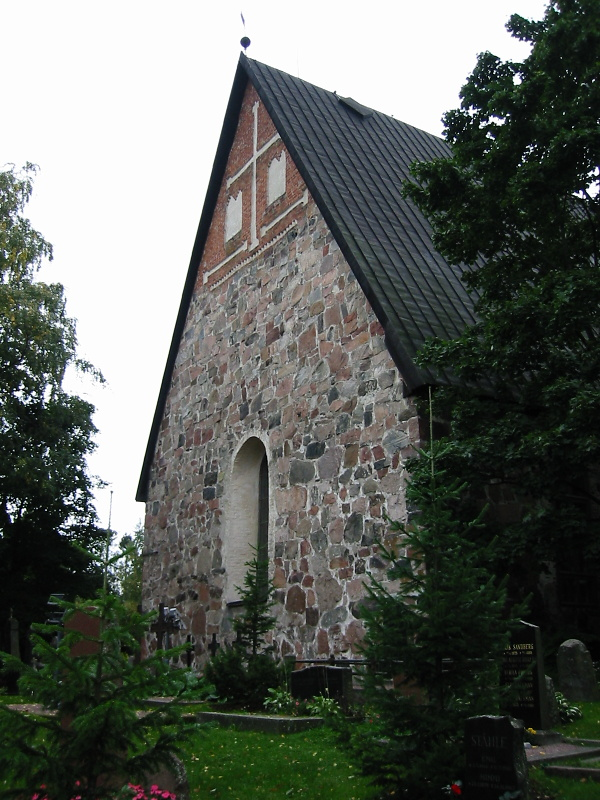
- Espoo Cathedral

Location
- Country: Finland
- Ecclesiastical province: Turku & Finland
- Metropolitan: Archbishop of Turku & Finland

Statistics
- Parishes: 25
- Members: 402 000

Information
- Denomination: Evangelical Lutheran Church of Finland
- Established: 2004
- Cathedral: Espoo Cathedral

Current leadership
- Bishop: Kaisamari Hintikka
- Metropolitan Archbishop: Tapio Luoma

The Diocese of Espoo (Finnish: Espoon hiippakunta, Swedish: Esbo stift) is the newest of the nine dioceses of the Evangelical Lutheran Church of Finland. The diocese came into existence in 2004 after the Diocese of Helsinki was split in two.

The seat of the diocese is the Espoo Cathedral and its first bishop was Mikko Heikka.

After Heikka's successor Tapio Luoma was elected Archbishop in 2018, Kaisamari Hintikka was elected to succeed him in 2019.

== List of Bishops ==
- Mikko Heikka 2004–2011
- Tapio Luoma 2012–2018
- Kaisamari Hintikka 2019-
