= Lapua Cathedral =

Church in Lapua, Finland

Lapua Cathedral Lapuan tuomiokirkko Lappo domkyrka
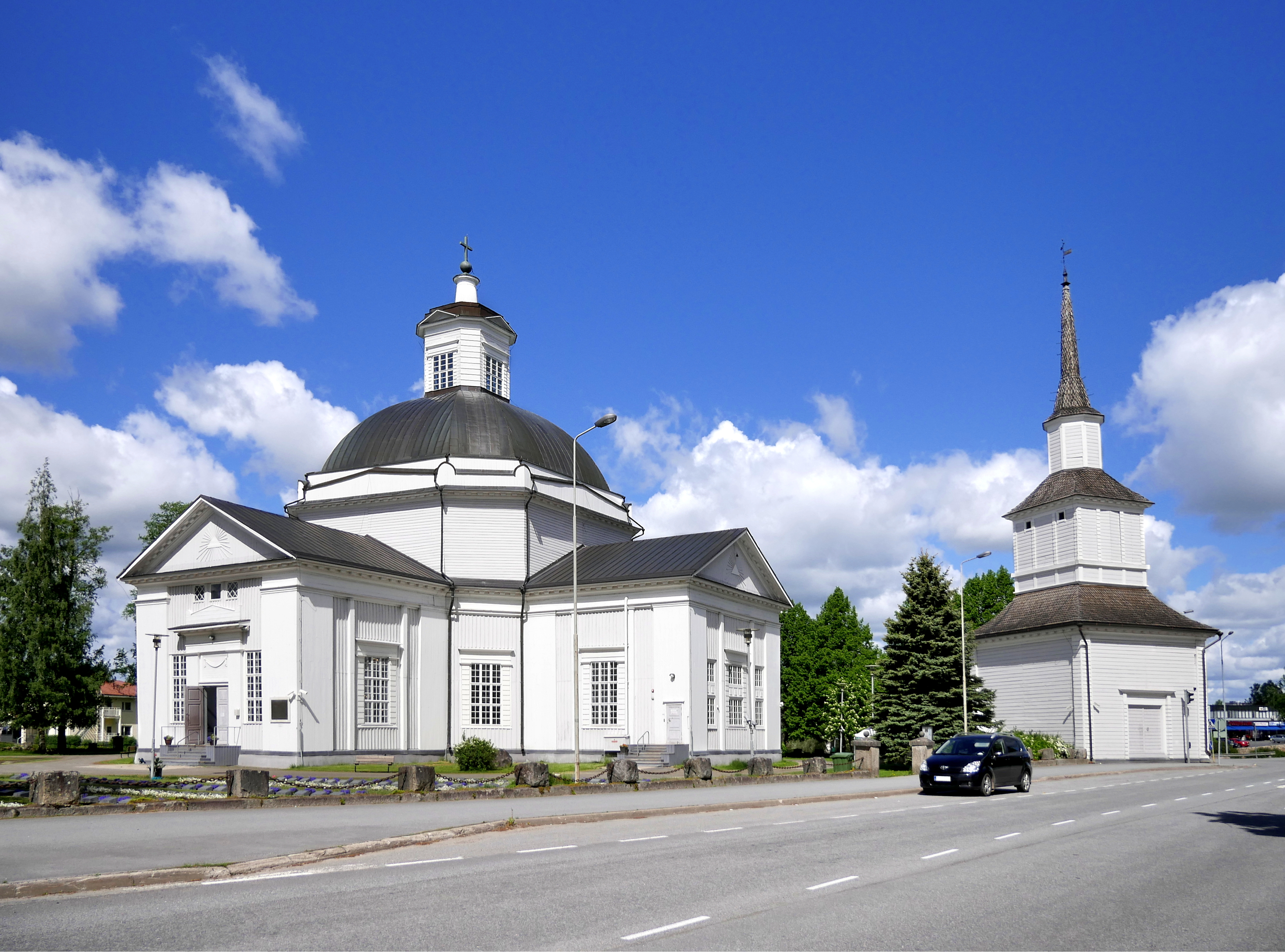
- Lapua Cathedral and belltower (right)

Religion
- Affiliation: Evangelical Lutheran Church of Finland
- District: Diocese of Lapua
- Ecclesiastical or organizational status: Cathedral

Location
- Location: Lapua, Finland
- Interactive map of Lapua Cathedral; Lapuan tuomiokirkko Lappo domkyrka
- Coordinates: 62°58′01″N 023°00′18″E

Architecture
- Architect: Carl Ludvig Engel
- Type: Cathedral
- Style: Neoclassical
- Completed: 1827

Lapua Cathedral (Finnish: Lapuan tuomiokirkko; Swedish: Lappo domkyrka) is a church in Lapua, Finland, and the seat of the Diocese of Lapua. The neoclassical cathedral was designed by Carl Ludvig Engel and built in 1827. The cathedral's pipe organ is the largest in Finland.
