= Evangelical Lutheran Church of Finland =

One of the national churches of Finland

Evangelical Lutheran Church of Finland
- Suomen evankelis-luterilainen kirkko
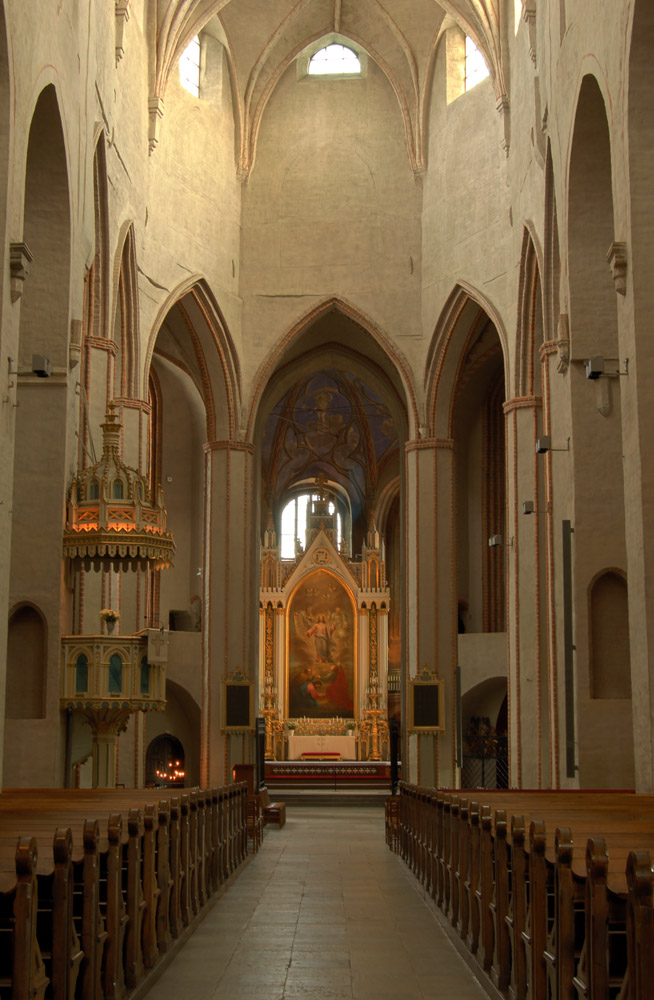
- Interior view of the primatial mother church of Finland, Turku Cathedral
- Abbreviation: ELCF (Finnish: EVL)
- Type: National church
- Classification: Protestant
- Orientation: Lutheran
- Scripture: Protestant Bible
- Theology: High church Lutheran
- Polity: Episcopal
- Governance: General Synod
- Primate: Tapio Luoma
- National guidance: Bishops' Conference (11 members)
- Regional structure: Hierarchical dioceses (9)
- Local units: Electorally democratic parishes
- Associations: Lutheran World Federation; Porvoo Communion; World Council of Churches; Conference of European Churches
- Region: Finland
- Language: Finnish, Swedish, Sámi
- Headquarters: Helsinki
- Origin: 29 March 1809; 217 years ago Diet of Porvoo
- Separated from: Church of Sweden
- Separations: Evangelical Lutheran Mission Diocese of Finland (2003)
- Parishes: 367 (2022)
- Members: 3,457,125 (2025)
- Official website: evl.fi/en/

Coat of arms
- Gules, a Maltese cross with ends concave Or, cantoned with four roses Argent
- Adopted: 1990

The Evangelical Lutheran Church of Finland (Finnish: Suomen evankelis-luterilainen kirkko; Swedish: Evangelisk-lutherska kyrkan i Finland) is a national church of Finland and belongs to the Lutheran branch of Christianity. The church enjoys the legal position of a national church in the country, along with the Orthodox Church of Finland.

The church is a member of the World Council of Churches and the Conference of European Churches. It is also a member of the Porvoo Communion and is actively involved in ecumenical relations.

With 3.4 million members as of 2025, the Evangelical Lutheran Church of Finland is one of the largest Lutheran churches in the world. It is Finland's largest religious community with 61.2% of the Finnish population being members of the church, as of 2025. The church is led by a primate who holds the title of Archbishop of Turku and Finland; the office's 15th and current occupant being Tapio Luoma, who succeeded Kari Mäkinen on 3 June 2018.

== History ==
=== Catholic bishopric ===
The Evangelical Lutheran Church of Finland traces its lineage to the medieval Diocese of Turku, which was established in 1156 and is geographically coterminous with present-day Finland. Christianity was introduced to Finland slowly: the first signs of the Christian faith being found in burial sites dated to the 9th century.

Based on etymological evidence, it seems that its very first influences came to present-day Finland from the Eastern Christian tradition. Archaeological evidence shows that by the middle 12th century, Christianity was dominant in the region around present-day Turku. One legend recounts a crusade dated around 1054, but no contemporary or archaeological evidence backs the story. Another legend is that the martyr-bishop St. Henry founded the Finnish Church, but that is also most likely fictional.

The introduction of Christianity was mostly a peaceful, slow process contemporaneous with the gradual integration with Sweden, although a series of Swedish-led crusades were fought during this era.

The first bishop, whose name was Thomas, lived in the first half of the 13th century. Thomas was granted resignation by Pope Innocent IV on 21 February 1245. According to the pope, Thomas had admitted committing several felonies, such as torturing a man to death, and forging a papal letter.

The ecclesiastical hierarchy was completely established during the Second Swedish Crusade.

During the Middle Ages, the Diocese of Turku was under the primacy of the Archbishop of Uppsala, mirroring the country's Swedish political rule. The diocese had a school, making it capable of educating its own priests, but several Finns also studied abroad in the universities of Germany and Paris.

Before the Reformation, the most important monastic orders active in the bishopric were those of the Franciscans, the Dominicans, and the Bridgettines. The liturgy of the diocese followed the Dominican model.

=== Part of the Church of Sweden ===
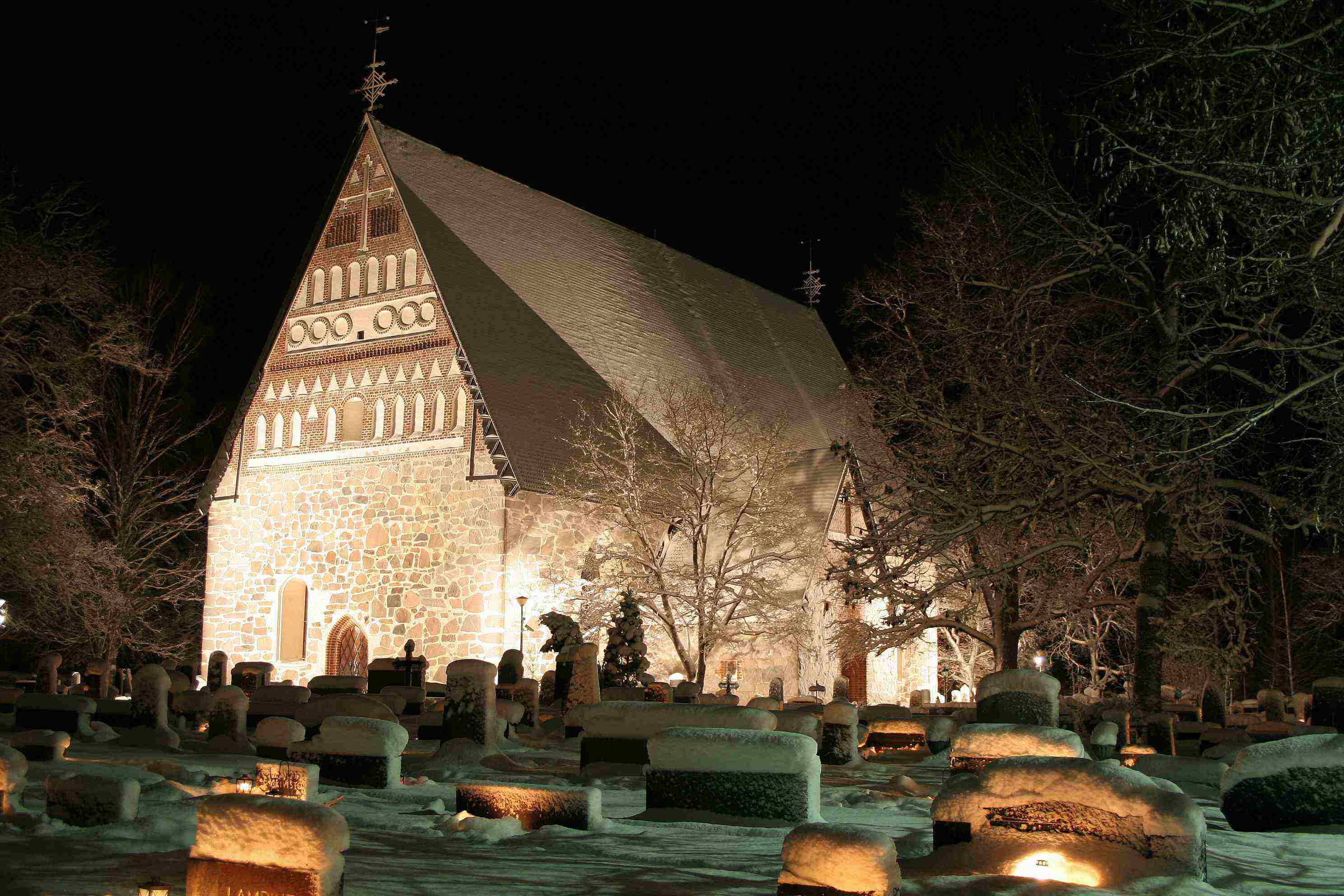
The sixteenth-century Hollola church which was converted during the Reformation

The Swedish Reformation began during the reign of King Gustav Vasa (1527) and reached its conclusion in 1560. Sweden, like other Nordic countries, adopted the Lutheran form of Protestantism. Catholic monastic estates adopted the new faith during this period as well, becoming Lutheran monasteries and Lutheran convents.

The first Lutheran Bishop of Turku was Martinus Johannis Skytte, former vicar general of the Dominican Province of Dacia. He retained most of the old Catholic forms within the Diocese, which was part of the now-independent Church of Sweden. The doctrinal reformation of the Finnish Church took place during the episcopacy of Mikael Agricola, who had studied at the University of Wittenberg under Martin Luther.

Agricola translated the whole New Testament and large portions of the Old Testament into Finnish. In addition, he authored a large number of Finnish liturgical texts in the spirit of The Reformation, while preserving a number of decidedly Catholic customs such as the retention of many holy days including the Visitation of Mary and Feast of the Cross as well as the wearing of the bishop's mitre. While images and sculptures of saints were retained in the churches, they were no longer venerated. Agricola was also the first Bishop of Turku who was married.

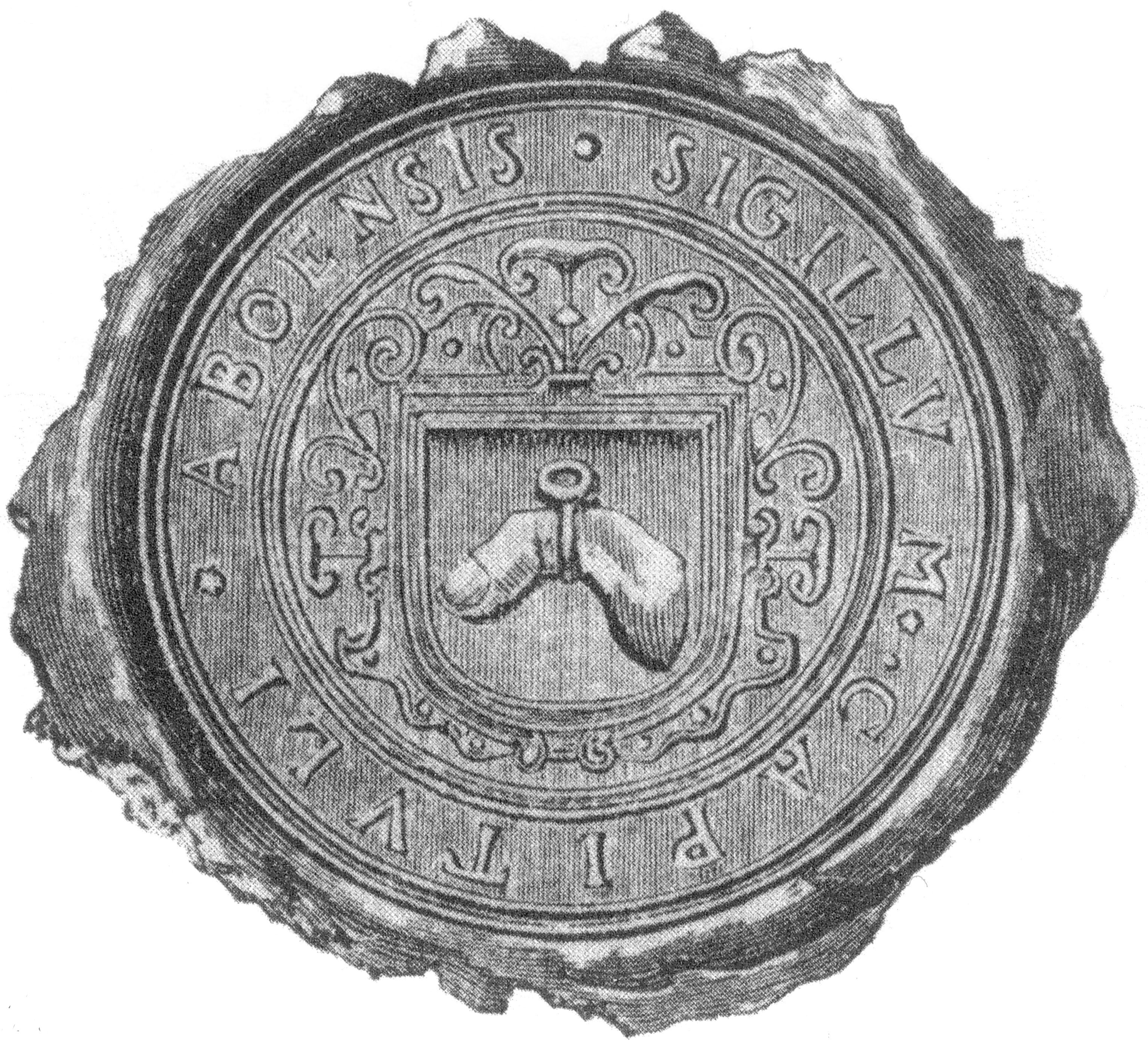
The seal of the Diocese of Turku during the 16th and 17th centuries featured a depiction of the finger of St. Henry. The post-Reformation diocese included the relic of a pre-Reformation saint in its seal.

By the end of the 16th century, the Swedish Reformation was finally complete, and the following century was known as the period of Lutheran orthodoxy. Membership in the church was obligatory, as was attendance at Divine Service.

In newly conquered Finnish Karelia, the Lutheran Church suppressed the Eastern Orthodoxy of the local population, which drove a large number to Russia.

At this time, the Church started to lay the foundations for comprehensive education, in which every person was required to know the basic tenets of the Christian faith. Parish vergers were given the duty of instructing children in reading and in the Catechism. The education of priests was improved, the Royal Academy of Turku was founded, and the educational system was codified in the Church Act of 1686.

In the early 18th century, Finland was occupied by Russia for a decade during the Great Northern War. A large portion of Finland was annexed by Russia, where the Lutheran church remained active despite being under Russian rule. The two branches of Finnish Lutheranism that were thereby divided were reunited in the early 19th century.

In both Russia and Sweden, Lutheranism was greatly affected by the theology of Enlightenment, which had the effect of secularizing the Church. This, and the lavish lifestyle of parish vicars, caused public resentment which became visible in popular local revival movements.

=== An independent state church ===
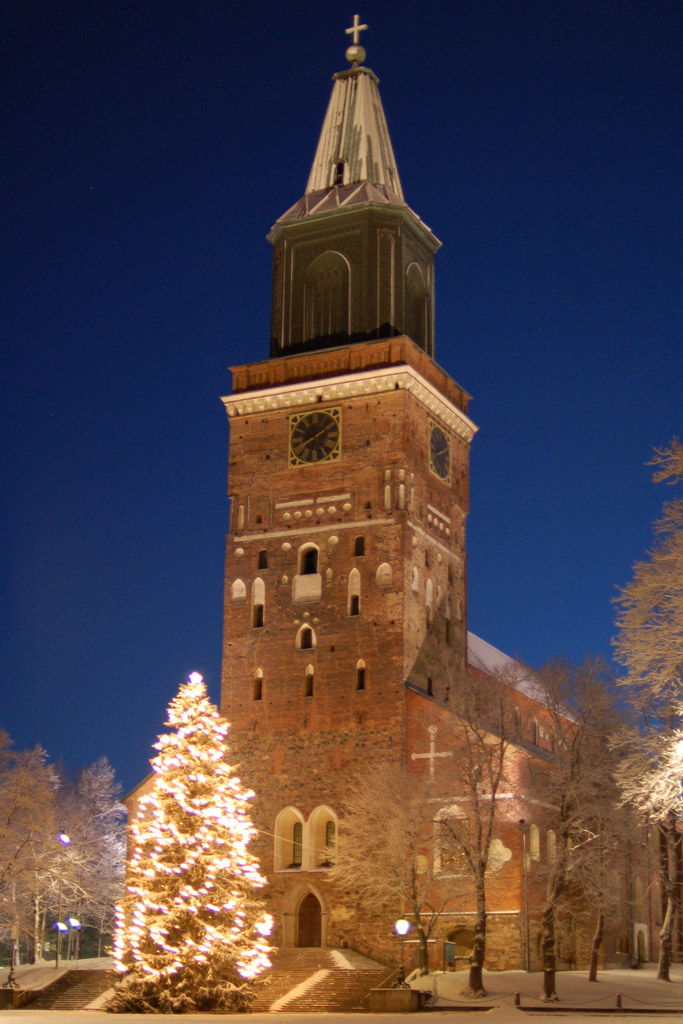
The Turku Cathedral is considered the national shrine of Finland, and is the seat of its ex officio primate.

The Evangelical Lutheran Church of Finland is a successor to the Church of Sweden, of which it was a part until 1809, when the Grand Duchy of Finland was established as a part of the Russian Empire and consequently shared established status with the Orthodox Church of Finland.

In 1869, a new Church Act was passed by the Finnish Lantdag. The Act separated church and the state, giving the church its own legislative body, known as the central Synod.

Changes in ecclesiastical form could be made only by the central Synod, which had the sole right to propose changes to the Church Act. These changes could subsequently either be passed or vetoed by the Lantdag and the Russian Emperor. A year earlier, Lutheran parishes had been differentiated from the secular municipalities, with both being given their own finances and administrative bodies.

The Church's general responsibility for comprehensive education and for the care of the poor was transferred to the secular municipalities. The Church accepted separation from the state, because the head of state was the Orthodox Russian Emperor, it regarded complete integration with the state as problematic.

In 1889, an act was passed allowing other Christian denominations to act freely in the country, and members of the Lutheran Church were given the right to leave the church to join other Christian communities. Since 1923, it has been possible to leave the state church without having to join another religious congregation.

During the early 19th century several revivalist movements were formed, four of which were particularly prominent, namely:

- Rukoilevaisuus (those who kneel to pray, or pray frequently), founded by peasant girl Liisa Erkintytär, and later by the priest Abraham Achrenius; mostly active in Western Finland.
- The Awakening (also called Pietists), founded by the peasant Paavo Ruotsalainen.
- Evankelisuus (connected to Neo-Lutheranism), founded by the priest Fredrik Gabriel Hedberg.
- Laestadianism, founded by Lars Levi Laestadius.

The revivalists met strong opposition from the bishops and the educated part of the population but drew large followings in the countryside. In modern Finnish historiography, the revivalist movements have been considered to be a part of the social upheaval caused by the modernization of society.

In the late 19th century, the Church started to face opposition from liberalism, the position of the Church being particularly questioned by the emerging labor movement. The Church was also challenged by the Baptist faith and the Methodist faith, which became the first two private religious communities in Finland.

The Church reacted by allowing its own revivalist movements more freedom and by starting new youth activities such as Sunday schools and Christian youth associations, but the main current of Finnish nationalism was affected by Lutheranism. For example, the most important philosopher of Finnish nationalism, Johan Vilhelm Snellman, considered Lutheranism an important factor of the Finnish identity, although he was critical of the Church as an organization.

=== Disestablished national church ===
In the early 20th century, the old Landtag, based on the four estates of the realm, was changed into a unicameral parliament (Eduskunta) selected by equal vote.

In 1908, an amendment of the Church Act freed church members from the legal duty to receive the Eucharist at least once a year. After this, church attendance dropped and has since become an indicator of personal religious opinion. (See also kyrkogångsplikt, the previous requirement to attend church services.)

Finnish independence, in 1917, was immediately followed by the Finnish Civil War, with the church associating itself with the White (nationalist) side, while the Red Guards embraced anti-clericalism to the point of murdering priests.

In the Constitution of 1919, the new republic was deemed to be non-confessional and freedom of worship was enshrined as a right.

In 1923, this right was further implemented through the Freedom of Religion Act. Although the act gave the right for every adult Finn to leave the Church (and consequently be free from the duty of paying Church tax), the vast majority of the people remained members, regardless of their political leanings. In the early part of the 20th century, a number of Eastern Orthodox Finns became Evangelical Lutheran, choosing to have their children baptised as Evangelical Lutherans.

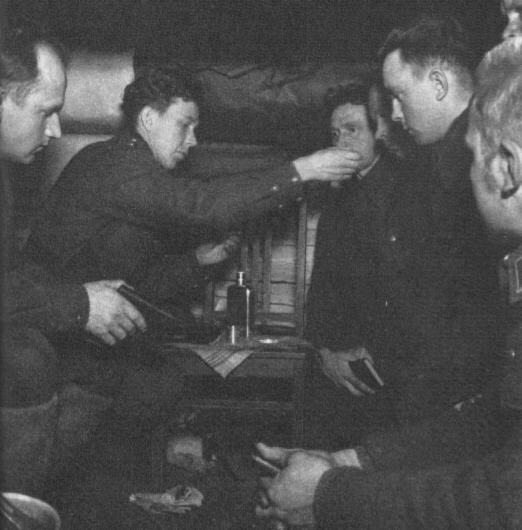
A Finnish military chaplain administering Holy Communion in 1940, during the Winter War. The shared experience of battle shaped the Church and the society for decades and affected the stance of the Church in social policy strongly.

During World War II, the church was an important factor in Finnish nationalism. The common nationalist cry during the war was For the home, the religion and the Fatherland (Finnish: Kodin, uskonnon ja isänmaan puolesta, Swedish: För hem, tro och fosterland). In addition, during the war, the church participated actively in social work, thereby coming closer to the labour movement.

Military chaplains, who shared the life of the common soldiers for several years, also grew closer to the life of the working class. At the war's end, these so-called brother-in-arms priests (Finnish: asevelipapit/vapenbrödra präster) continued their work among factory workers. Elsewhere in society, liturgical, family, and youth works emerged as new forms of church activity, and the position of laity within the Church was strengthened. The so-called fifth revivalist movement also began as a result of revivals experienced during the war. Martti Simojoki and Mikko Juva were two former military chaplains who became Finnish archbishops, their time in the office covering two decades.

In the 1960s, the church faced strong opposition from the radical left, who considered it an old-fashioned fortress of reaction and criticized the rudiments of the church's position within the state.

The 1966 blasphemy trial of novelist Hannu Salama became a cause célèbre for the antiestablishmentarian position. Salama was sentenced to three months in prison but placed on probation, before subsequently being pardoned by President Urho Kekkonen.

Another widely criticized aspect of the Finnish Church-State relationship was the prohibition of public dances and movie theaters on Saturdays preceding certain Sundays, a ban that remained in effect until 1968.

The Church responded to its unpopular situation by a program of modernization.

During the 1970s, work on new Finnish Bible translations and a new hymnal was begun. The hymnal, which incorporated a large number of revivalist and youth hymns, was adopted in 1986. In addition, a new Bible translation (based on the theory of dynamical equivalence) was completed and approved for use in 1992. Finally, the Synod opened the priesthood to women, a change that was first discussed, but not passed, by the Synod in 1963, and which continues to cause controversy. In response, traditionalist clergy and laity from the Evangelical Lutheran Church of Finland, established, in 2003, the Evangelical Lutheran Mission Diocese of Finland, a nonterritorial ecclesiastical province that only ordains men to holy orders and does not perform same-sex marriages. The Evangelical Lutheran Mission Diocese of Finland is a member of the International Lutheran Council, which represents Confessional Lutheran bodies around the globe.

== Position in Finnish society ==
Religious affiliation in Finland, 1950–2025
Year	Lutheran	Orthodox	Other	None
1950	95.7%	1.7%	0.4%	2.7%
1980	90.3%	1.1%	0.7%	7.8%
1990	87.9%	1.1%	0.9%	10.2%
2000	85.1%	1.1%	1.1%	12.7%
2005	83.1%	1.1%	1.1%	14.7%
2010	78.2%	1.1%	1.4%	19.2%
2011	77.2%	1.1%	1.5%	20.1%
2012	76.4%	1.1%	1.4%	21.0%
2013	75.3%	1.1%	1.4%	22.1%
2014	73.8%	1.1%	1.6%	23.5%
2015	73.0%	1.1%	1.6%	24.3%
2016	72.0%	1.1%	1.6%	25.3%
2017	70.9%	1.1%	1.6%	26.3%
2018	69.8%	1.1%	1.7%	27.4%
2019	68.7%	1.1%	1.7%	28.5%
2020	67.8%	1.1%	1.7%	29.4%
2021	66.6%	1.1%	1.7%	30.6%
2022	65.2%	1.1%	1.8%	32.0%
2023	63.6%	1.0%	1.8%	33.6%
2024	62.2%	1.0%	1.8%	34.9%
2025	61.2%	1.0%	1.8%	35.9%

The Evangelical Lutheran Church of Finland has a legal position as a national church in the country alongside the Orthodox Church of Finland. The Constitution of Finland provides for a Church Act (kirkkolaki) to organize and govern the Evangelical Lutheran Church; the Act can only be amended with the initiative of the Synod of the Church – maintaining their autonomy since Tsarist times.

Finnish society has experienced a general secularization, and membership in the church has decreased in recent decades. In 2015, Eroakirkosta.fi, a website which offers an electronic service for resigning from Finland's state churches, reported that half a million church members had resigned from the church since the website was opened in 2003. Nevertheless, the church retains the allegiance of a large majority of the population, a special role in state ceremonies, and the right to collect the church tax from its members in conjunction with governmental income taxation. In addition to the membership tax, businesses also participate to some extent by a tax that is distributed to the church.

Avoidance of the church tax (between 1 and 2 percent depending on location) has been a popular reason cited for defections from the Church. In 2010, the number of defections hit a record of 83,097, caused in part by the church's position that homosexuality is a sin. That position was made clear on a Finnish television discussion program concerning gay rights that was broadcast on 12 October 2010, in which church clergy and laymen were divided both for and against proposed legal amendments to increase LGBT rights.

Stefan Wallin, Finland's minister responsible for church affairs, accused Päivi Räsänen, the leader of the Christian Democrats, of deliberately taking a public position against homosexuality and gay rights in order to drive away from the church those people who might hold more liberal views on gay acceptance.

On 9 February 2011, the ELCF Bishops' Conference issued a "Pastoral instruction concerning free prayer with and for those who have registered their civil partnership", which can be conducted either privately or publicly in a church, with or without guests, but which is not to be confused with "the blessing of a partnership comparable to marriage".

As of 2025, 61.2% of Finns belonged to the Evangelical Lutheran Church, a decline of 17.0 percentage points from 2010. The highest share of the population belonging to the church is in South Ostrobothnia, where 78.5% belong to the church. Meanwhile, the lowest share is in Uusimaa, where the proportion is 49.6%. On a municipal level Perho (90.3%) is the only and last municipality where over 90% belong to the church. Helsinki (44.0%), Vantaa (44.0%) and Espoo (47.6%) are municipalities where a minority of the population belong to the church.

== Teachings ==
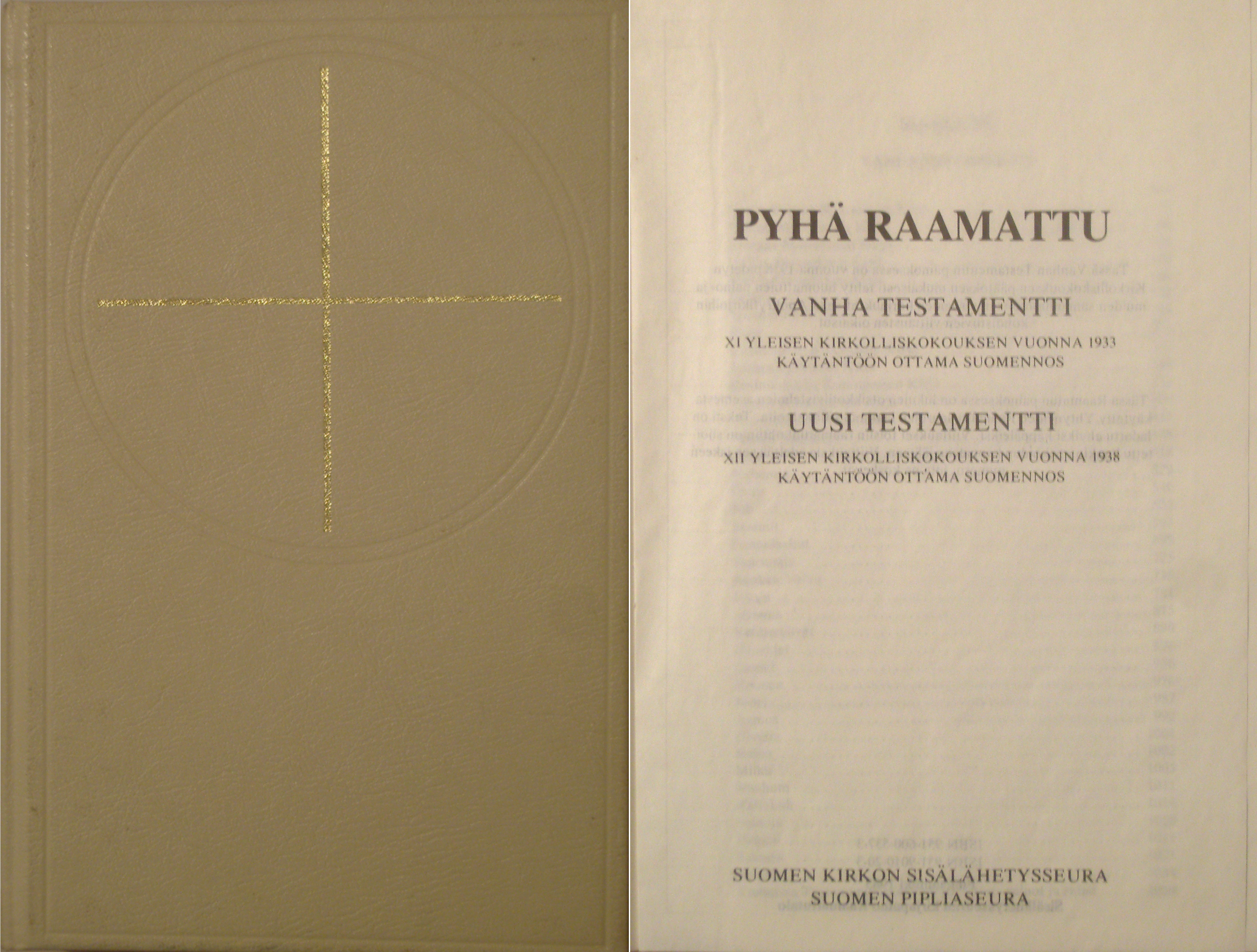
Cover and first page of Finnish Holy Bible from year 1933(Old Testament) and 1938(New Testament)

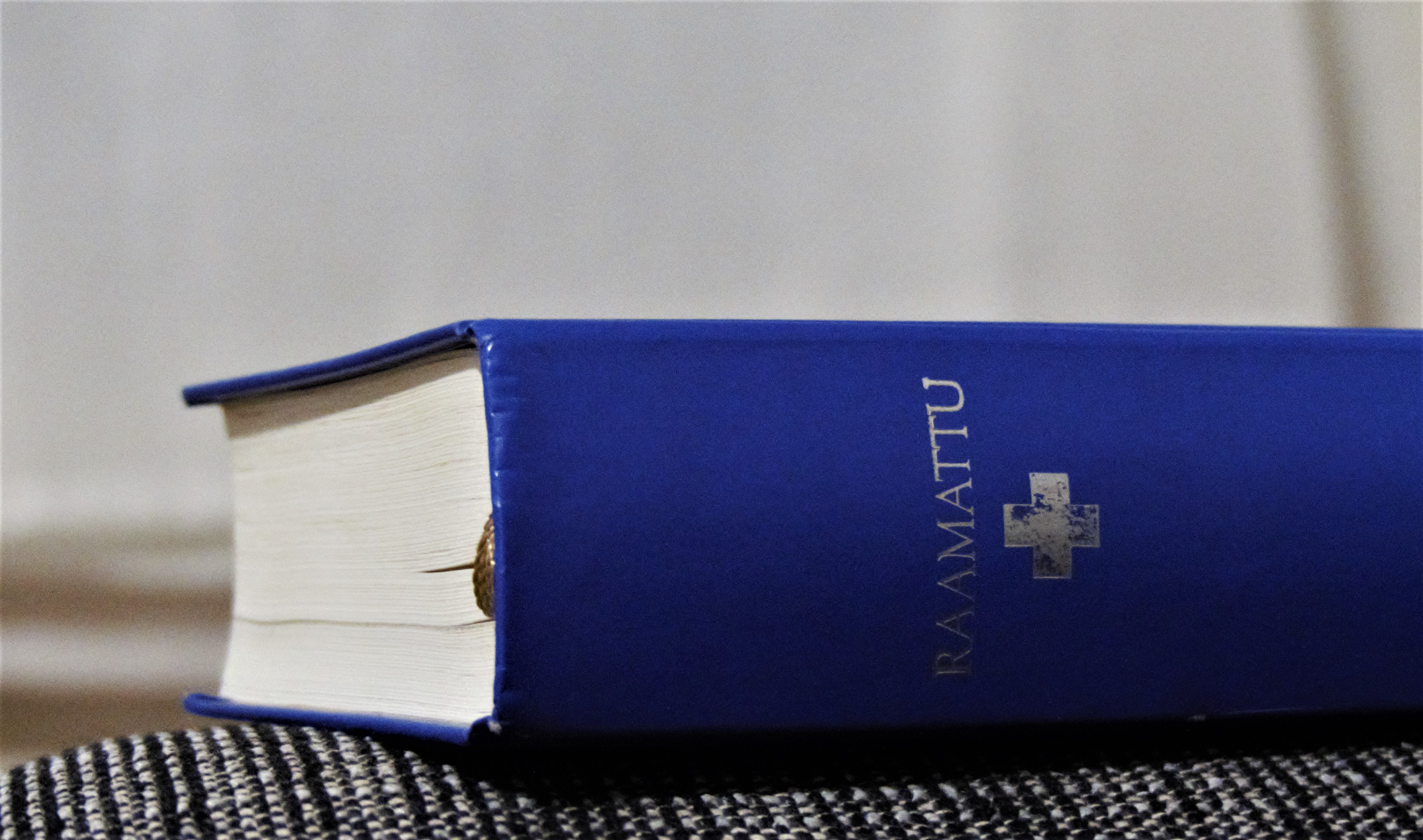
The New Finnish Bible (1992) is a modern Finnish Bible translation. It replaced the previous translation from 1933/1938 in official use.

The Evangelical Lutheran Church of Finland sees itself as part of the one, holy, catholic, and apostolic Church. It is Lutheran in doctrine, following the teachings of Martin Luther. The church is a member of the Lutheran World Federation and the Porvoo Communion, but has not signed the Leuenberg Agreement.

The faith of the Church is professed in the three creeds of the old church (Apostles', Nicene and Athanasian) and the Lutheran confessional documents as defined in the Book of Concord.

The practical faith is described in the catechism of the church, which is based on and literally includes the Luther's Small Catechism. The latest version of the catechism was accepted by the General Synod in 1999.

The Church accepts the doctrines of the virgin birth and bodily resurrection.

The church does not embrace creationism but states:

God is the Creator of all. With his word he created the entire universe. Science studies the mystery of the genesis of the world as well as the evolution of nature and people. Faith trusts that underlying all is God's creative will and love for the creation.

Among contemporary doctrines, the church takes a moderate position.

The Church allows its members to work as military personnel or as judges, considering these duties important to the welfare of society.

=== Human sexuality ===
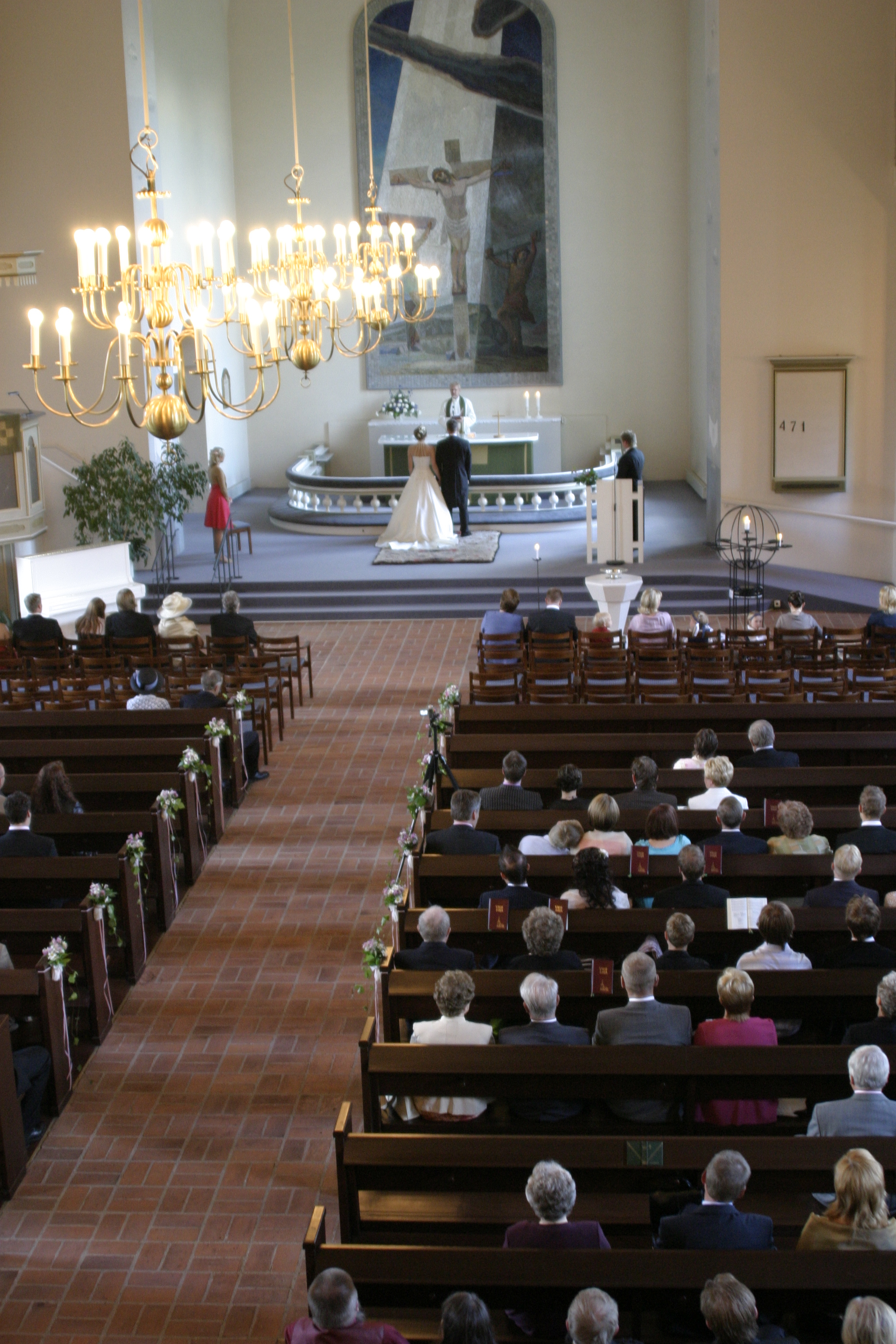
A wedding in Kiuruvesi

The relation of the church to sexuality is somewhat ambiguous, strictly condemning extramarital sex but in relation to premarital sex stating:

Sexuality disconnected from love and from responsibility enslaves people, bringing harm to themselves and others.

=== Divorce, remarriage, and reproductive health care ===
Divorce and subsequent remarriage is accepted, with reservations. Abortion is accepted, because the church deems that the woman has the right to decide to terminate the pregnancy but the woman is not allowed to make the decision alone. Abortion should be limited to serious cases where the birth would cause serious danger or suffering either to the family or the child. Such cases should be defined in legislation, which is the case in Finland. However, the woman pondering abortion should get all possible support before and after the decision, regardless of its outcome.

=== LGBTQ inclusion ===
On LGBT issues, the Church has been engaged in dialogue. The church has no official policy on the ordination of gay clergy, and, since 2002, "one bishop has declared his willingness to ordain homosexuals." The synod of bishops has stated that sexual minorities should not be shunned or persecuted, but that they are, as all people, responsible for the applications of their sexuality. In 2010, the church took a more open position and voted to allow prayer services to be given following a civil same-sex union. The purpose of such prayer services, according to the Finnish Lutheran synod and archbishop, is to take a "clear and unequivocal stance in support of gay and lesbian couples". According to church policy on same-sex civil partnerships, "the couple may organise prayers with a priest or other church workers and invited guests. This may take place on church premises."

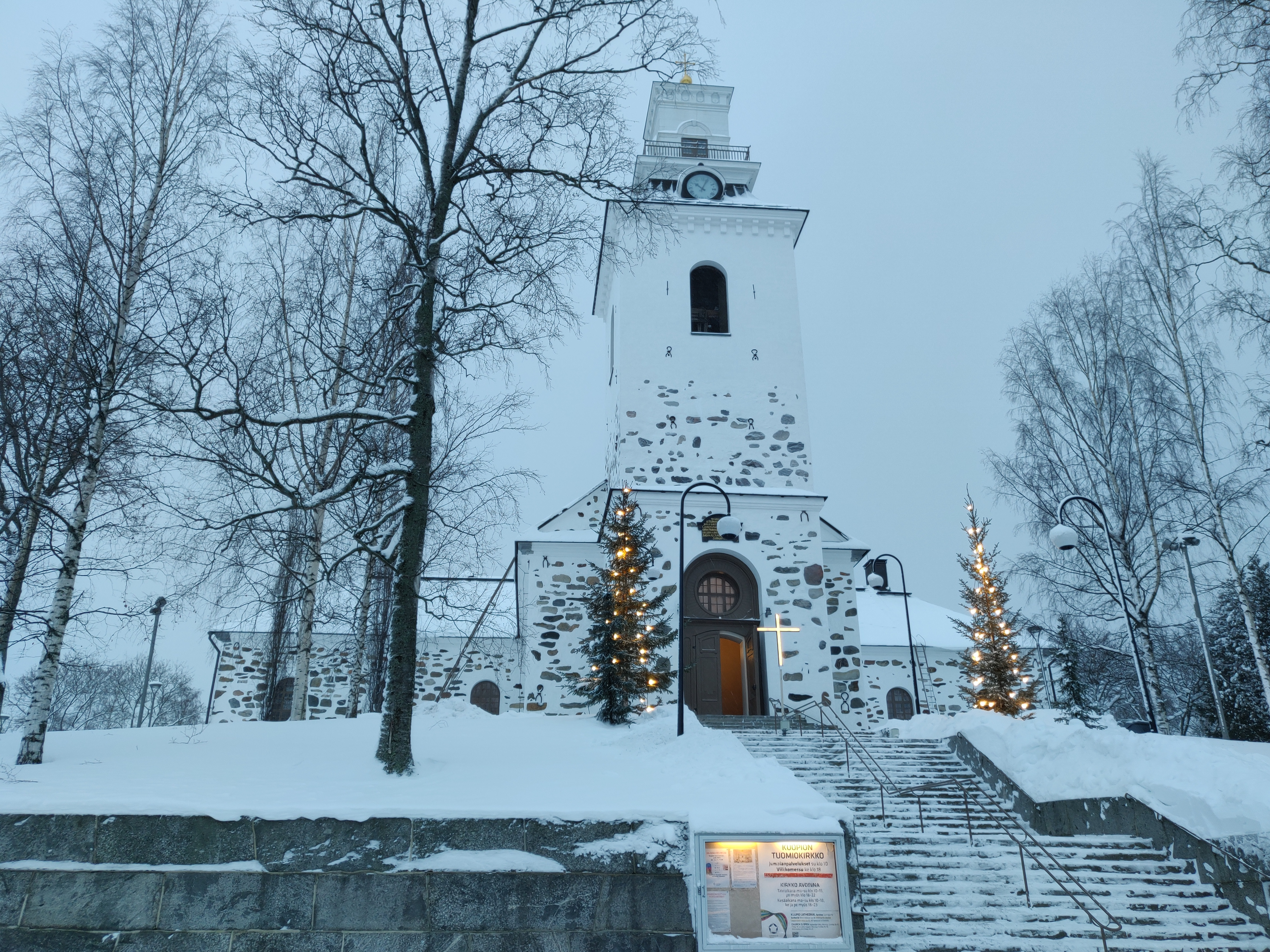
The Kuopio Cathedral, the seat of the Diocese of Kuopio

In 2012, the Diocese of Kuopio appointed an openly transgender pastor to an office in the church.

After same-sex marriage became legal in 2014, Archbishop Kari Mäkinen announced his support for gay marriage. In 2016, the Synod did not authorize a rite for same-sex marriage, but did, as before, allow pastors "to pray with and for all couples who have entered into a civil [same-sex] marriage". Therefore, while the bishops did not agree to performing same-sex marriages, "the bishops have taken the position that it is possible to hold prayer services to bless same-sex couples." As with civil partnerships, the church teaches that "same-sex couples can have a prayer ceremony" in the church. The bishops' announcement also said that "[this] change to marriage laws means that members of the Finnish Evangelical Lutheran Church, persons in high office and workers stand with same-sex [persons] in marriage." Some clergy announced their intent to marry same-gender couples arguing that "public servant's rights grant [them] the possibility of marrying same-sex couples". Nevertheless, the Diocese of Helsinki disciplined a pastor for performing a same-sex marriage.

In March 2024, the Bishops endorsed a proposal to allow clergy to perform same-sex marriages; the proposal will need to be approved by the General Synod. A spokesperson for the Bishops noted that in practice, some clergy have already been performing same-sex marriages; some dioceses have admonished clergy for doing so but others have not. In 2025, bishops confirmed that priests were permitted to individually perform same-sex marriages, but a proposal to recognize same-sex marriage as doctrine failed with 62 in favor and 40 against, falling "15 votes short of the three-quarters majority required to pass." In July of 2025, the bishops released pastoral guidance confirming that priests and congregations may bless and perform same-sex marriages as a local option.

=== Apostolic succession and sacraments ===
The apostolic succession of the Church is considered to have remained intact through the proper ordination of bishop Mikael Agricola, but it was broken in 1884 when all the Finnish Lutheran bishops died within a year. The succession remained valid in the Church of Sweden from where it was returned in the 1930s by the ordination of the bishop of Tampere. However, the concept of apostolic succession is important foremost in ecumenical contexts, particularly in dealings with the Anglican Communion. In the theology of the Church itself, the valid signs of the Church include only the "pure preaching of the gospel and the performance of the sacraments according to the decree of Christ".

The central point of the Church doctrine, does not, however, lie in the areas of sexuality and creation but in the doctrine of justification. The human being is always a sinner, completely unable to reach God by his own merit. However, Christians are atoned by the grace of God, through the sacrifice of Christ, completely undeservedly. The Christian is simultaneously a sinner and a righteous person. At the end of time, Christ will return and subject all to his judgment. Then everlasting perdition can only be avoided by Christ's mercy.

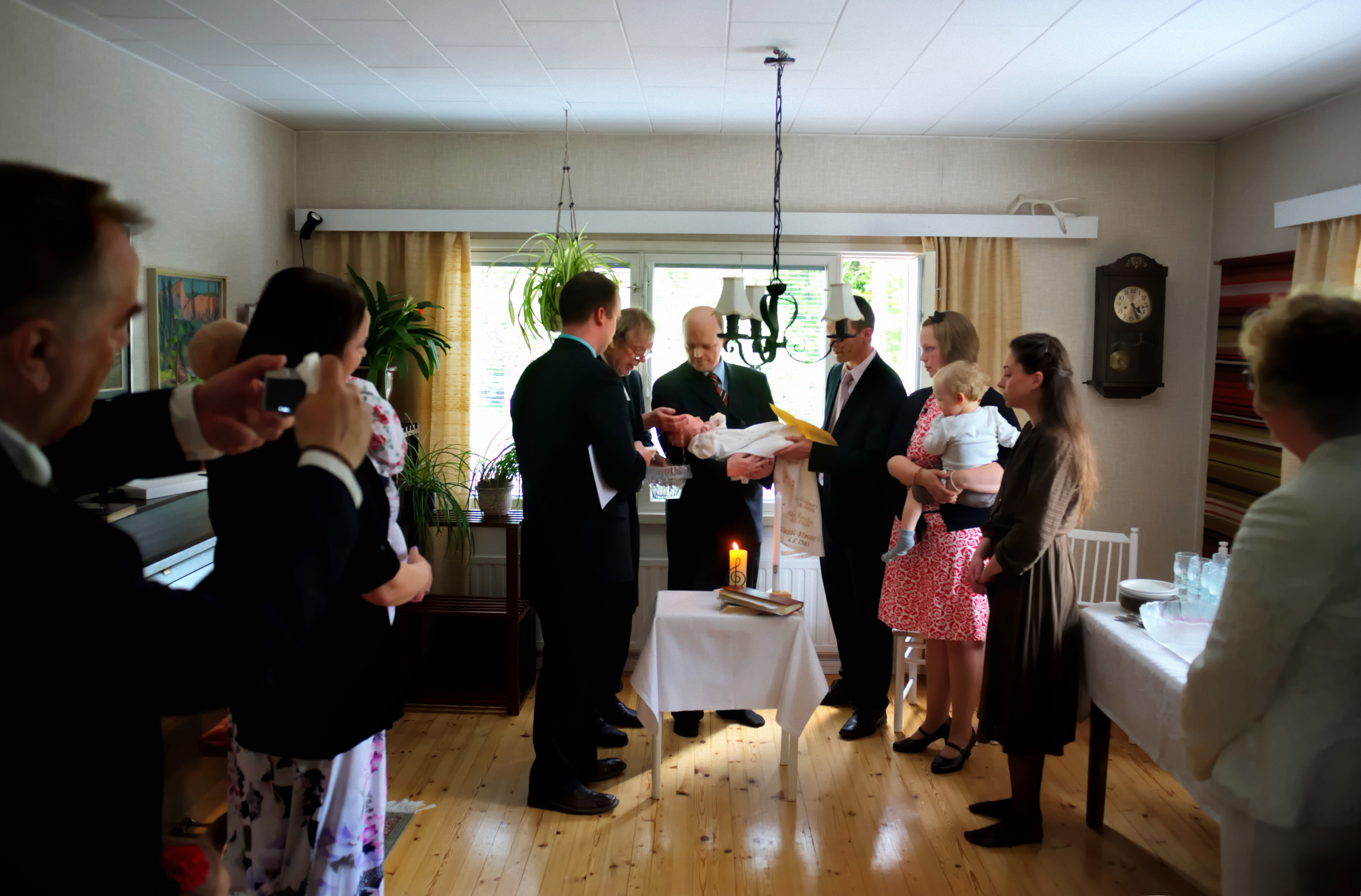
Baptism is one of the sacraments in the Lutheran church. In Finland, it is usually performed at the family's home.

The saving grace becomes visible in the two dominical sacraments, Holy Communion and Baptism. Baptism is administered even to children, as it is effective regardless of personal attitudes, "for Baptism and faith are God's work in us." Any Christian may perform a valid baptism, but in normal cases, the priest should perform the sacrament. An emergency baptism performed by a member of the Church must immediately be reported to the parish in which the baptism took place.

In the Holy Communion, or the Sacrament of the Altar, Christ gives his own real body and blood for people to eat and to drink (cf. sacramental union). The Church practises closed communion but does not put any limitations on its members for partaking; the only prerequisite is faith, however fragile. Children may take part in Communion after their parents have instructed them to understand the meaning of Communion. If a person is in mortal danger and wishes to receive Holy Communion, any Christian is allowed to administer him a valid sacrament. Normally, nonetheless, the administering of the sacrament is reserved to priests.

The third sacrament of confession and absolution is available in the Evangelical Lutheran Church of Finland.

The ordination of women is allowed.

Publicly, the church strongly supports the existing Finnish social welfare model, which it sees threatened especially by neoliberalism and globalization. This has led to the church being criticized from the political right for being the religious arm of social democracy. The church has answered that it takes no political sides but strives to work for the weakest in the society.

The Church does not control its members strictly. Rituals such as weddings and funerals are often considered to be the most important reasons to remain a member.

== Organisation ==
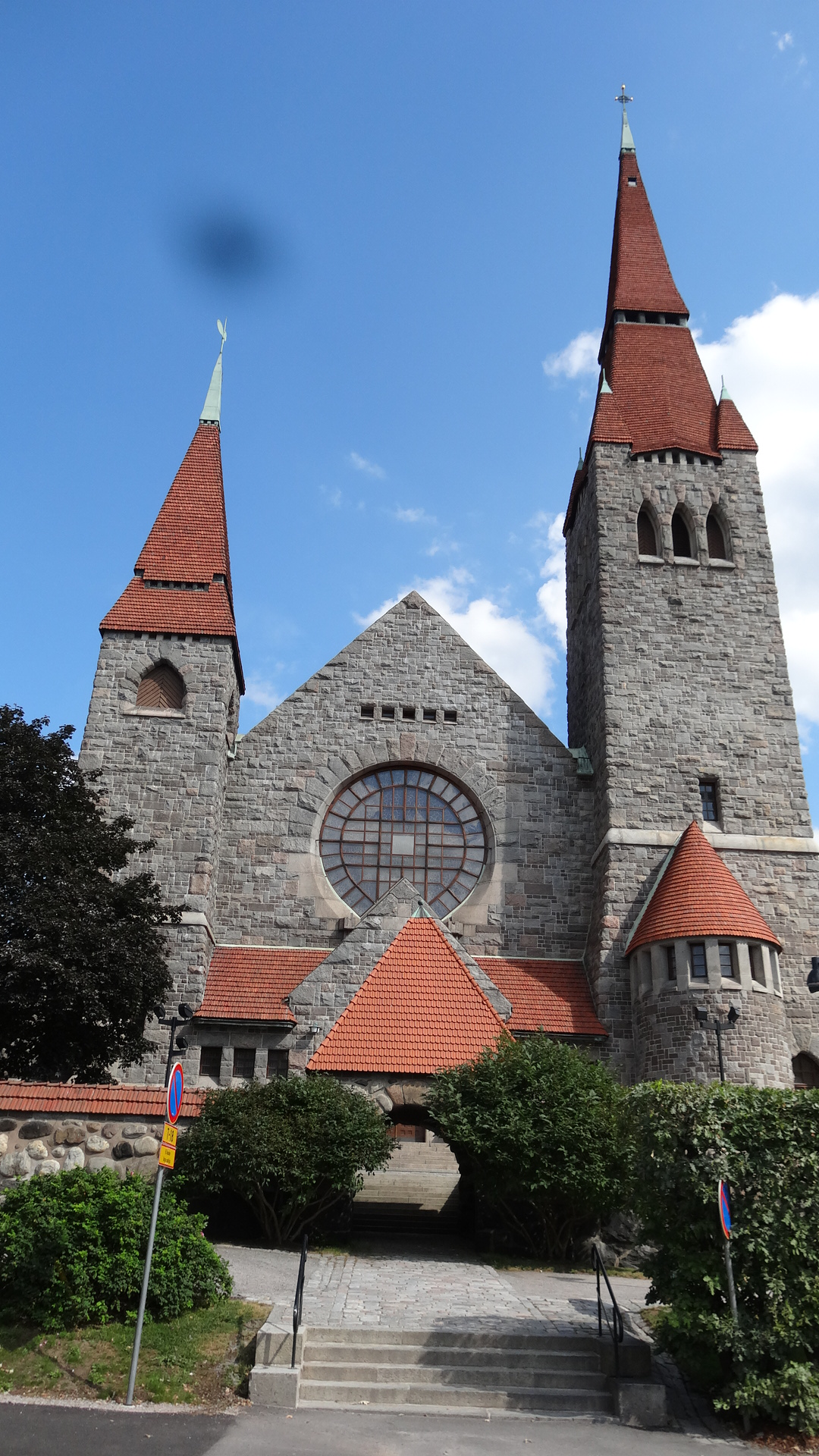
Tampere Cathedral

The structure of the Evangelical Lutheran Church of Finland is mainly based on geographical division. Every member belongs to the parish of their domicile, with parish boundaries following municipal boundaries. Large cities, on the other hand, are usually divided into several parishes, with the geographical location of the members' homes determining parish membership. The membership of a parish varies from a few hundred in small municipalities to around 60,000 members in the parish of Malmi, Helsinki. According to the Church Act, the parish is responsible for all the practical work performed by the church. The parish is headed by the vicar and the parish council. Both are elected by the members, using equal, closed voting. The term of the parish council is four years while the vicar is elected for life or until he reaches sixty-eight years of age. A parish is a legal person of public nature, capable of taxing its members. The amount of tax collected is decided by the parish council and falls between 1 and 2.25 percent of personal income. In practice, the tax is collected by the state, for a fee.

Financially, the parishes are responsible for themselves. However, poor parishes can be assisted by the central administration. On the other hand, all parishes are responsible for contributing 10 percent of their income to the central administration of the church and the dioceses. The day-to-day affairs of the parish administration are taken care of by the vicar and the parish board, elected by the parish council. In cities, the parishes of the city have a common parish council but separate parish boards.

=== Pastoral formation ===
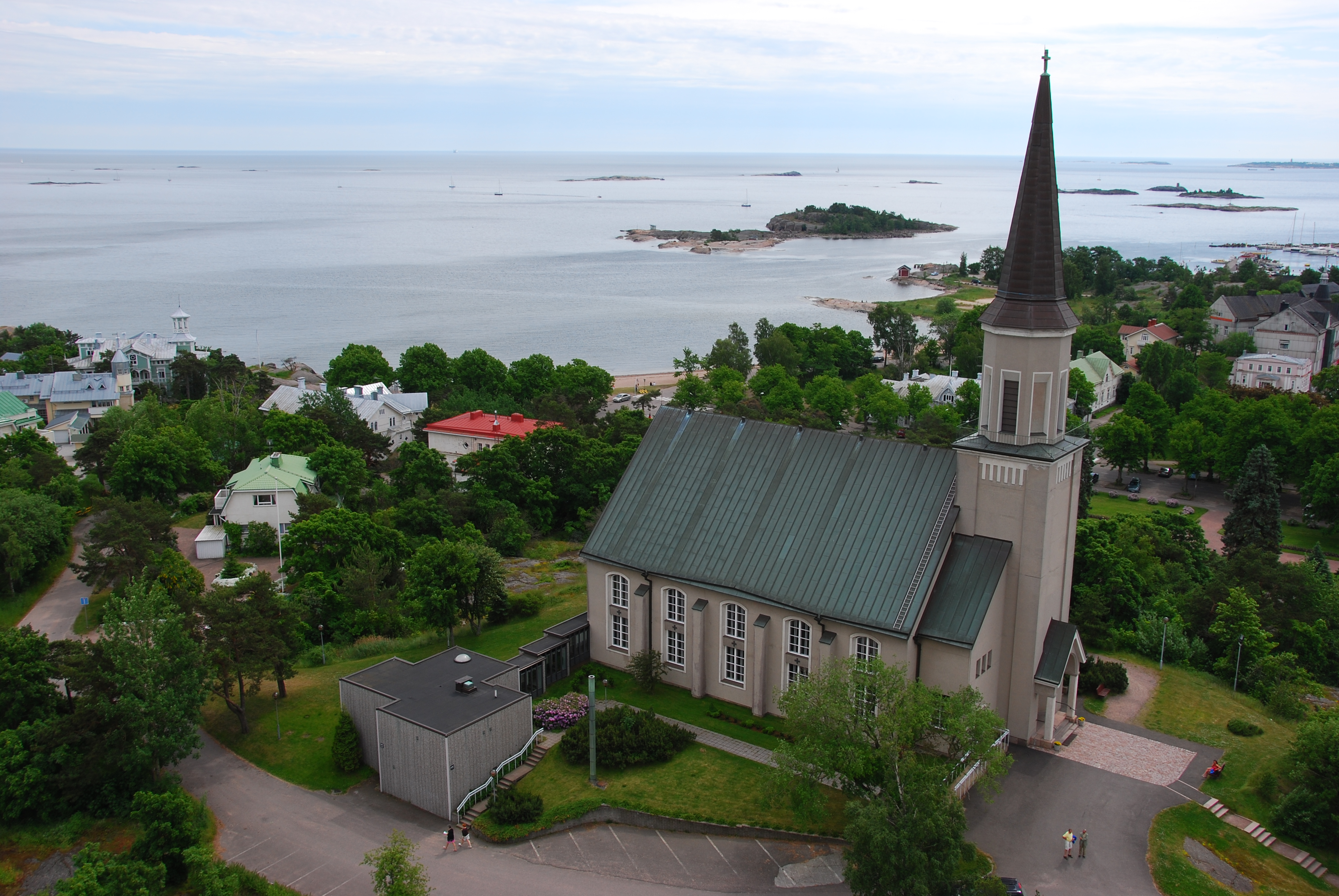
Evangelical Lutheran Church of Hanko, as seen from the town's water tower.

A master's degree in Theology is compulsory before ordination. The Church also has its own vocational postgraduate educational system. A newly ordained pastor is eligible for the position of Parish Pastor (Finnish: seurakuntapastori, Swedish: församlingspastor), formerly Assistant Priest (Finnish: apupappi, Swedish: adjunkt). In order to be eligible for the position of Chaplain (Finnish: kappalainen, Swedish: kaplan) or Vicar (Finnish: kirkkoherra, Swedish: kyrkoherde), the Pastoral Degree of the Church (Finnish: pastoraalitutkinto, Swedish: pastoralexamen) is required. Before being able to apply for the post of Vicar, a degree in leadership skills (Finnish: Seurakuntatyön johtamisen tutkinto, Swedish: Examen i ledning av församlingsarbete) is also compulsory. The Finnish Evangelical Lutheran Prayer Brotherhood is an optional clergy confraternity.

In order to be eligible for the position of a Vicar General (Finnish: tuomiorovasti, Swedish: domprost) or Diocesan Dean (Finnish: hiippakuntadekaani, Swedish: stiftsdekan) the Higher Pastoral Degree of the Church (Finnish: ylempi pastoraalitutkinto, Swedish: högre pastoralexamen) is required.

In addition to religious worship, local Lutheran communities arrange many non-religious activities as well. In Finland, as in other Nordic countries, most people go to church only occasionally, such as for Christmas and weddings.

=== Dioceses and bishops ===
The Evangelical Lutheran Church of Finland is divided into nine dioceses. Each diocese is headed by a bishop and a cathedral chapter. The Archdiocese of Turku is headed by the archbishop, who is personally responsible for leading two deaneries within that diocese. He is assisted by a bishop of Turku who takes day-to-day responsibility for running the rest of the diocese, leaving the archbishop free for his duties of national leadership and international representation. The bishops meet together regularly in the Bishops' Conference, which has eleven members; these are the archbishop, his assistant bishop of Turku, the other eight diocesan bishops, and the Chaplain General of the Defence Forces, whose title is kenttäpiispa ('field bishop'), although he is not necessarily in bishop's Orders.

Eight dioceses are regional, with the remaining one covering all of the country's Swedish-language parishes. The Church's supreme decision-making body is the Synod, which meets twice a year. Laity comprise a majority of the Synod, but a fixed number of seats are reserved for the clergy. The Synod proposes changes in the Ecclesiastical Act and decides on the Ecclesiastical Order. The Synod deals with questions of doctrine and approves the books of the church. The Synod directs the Church's common activities, administration, and finances. Congregational elections are held every four years to determine administrative posts at the local level.

Current membership of the Evangelical Lutheran Church of Finland's Bishops' Conference
Diocese / Coat of arms	Founded	Cathedral	Incumbent	Photo
Archdiocese of Turku	1156	Turku Cathedral	15th Archbishop of Turku and Finland; Tapio Luoma (2018–)	Tapio Luoma, the 15th and current Archbishop of Turku and Finland
Archdiocese of Turku	1156	Turku Cathedral	4th Bishop of Turku; Mari Leppänen (2021–)	Coat of arms of the Bishop of Turku (no photo available)
Diocese of Tampere	1554	Tampere Cathedral	37th Bishop of Tampere; Matti Repo (2008–)	Matti Repo, the 37th and current Bishop of Tampere
Diocese of Oulu	1851	Oulu Cathedral	13th Bishop of Oulu; Jukka Keskitalo (2018–)	Jukka Keskitalo, the 13th and current Bishop of Oulu
Diocese of Mikkeli	1897	Mikkeli Cathedral	12th Bishop of Mikkeli; Mari Parkkinen (2023–)	Coat of arms of the Bishop of Mikkeli (no photo available)
Diocese of Borgå	1923	Porvoo Cathedral	8th Bishop of Borgå; Bo-Göran Åstrand (2019–)	Bo-Göran Åstrand, the 8th and current Bishop of Borgå
Diocese of Kuopio	1939	Kuopio Cathedral	7th Bishop of Kuopio; Jari Jolkkonen (2012–)	Jari Jolkkonen, the 7th and current Bishop of Kuopio
Defence Forces Bishopric (Note: The Finnish Defence Forces Bishopric is a special case as it has no cathedra, neither does its ordinary, the Chaplain General, receive any delegated authority over a geographical province or fall subject to the requirement to be a consecrated member of the episcopate. In addition, unlike the military ordinariates of other countries, its clergy are subject to the authority of their posts' respective territorial bishops.)	1941	none	Field Bishop; Pekka Asikainen (2023–)	Coat of arms of the Field Bishop (no photo available)
Diocese of Helsinki	1959	Helsinki Cathedral	7th Bishop of Helsinki; Teemu Laajasalo (2017–)	Teemu Laajasalo, the 7th and current Bishop of Helsinki
Diocese of Lapua	1959	Lapua Cathedral	5th Bishop of Lapua; Matti Salomäki (2022–)	Matti Salomäki, the 5th and current Bishop of Lapua
Diocese of Espoo	2004	Espoo Cathedral	3rd Bishop of Espoo; Kaisamari Hintikka (2019–)	Kaisamari Hintikka, the 3rd and current Bishop of Espoo

== See also ==
- Bollhustäppan
- Conventicle Act (Sweden)
- Finnish Evangelical Lutheran Church of America
- Finnish Seamen's Mission
- Treaty of Fredrikshamn

=== Other Nordic national Lutheran churches ===
- Church of Denmark
- Church of the Faroe Islands
- Church of Iceland
- Church of Norway
- Church of Sweden
