= Kirkkojärvi (Espoo) =

Dry lake in Espoo, Finland

- Location within Finland
- Coordinates: 60°N 24°E

Kirkkojärvi is a drained lake in Espoo, between Espoon keskus and Kauniainen, by Turunväylä.

Kirkkojärvi was drained during the construction of Tarvontie in the 1950s, but still today becomes a lake-like pool of water during the early spring floods.

Espoonjoki begins from Kirkkojärvi, where Glimsinjoki and Glomsinjoki merge.

The Kirkkojärvi neighbourhood has been built on the previous Kirkkojärvi area south of the Turunväylä (Finnish national road 1). The area north of Turunväylä is mostly bushy swampland. There is a small path on the northern side of the swampland by an Ikea store.

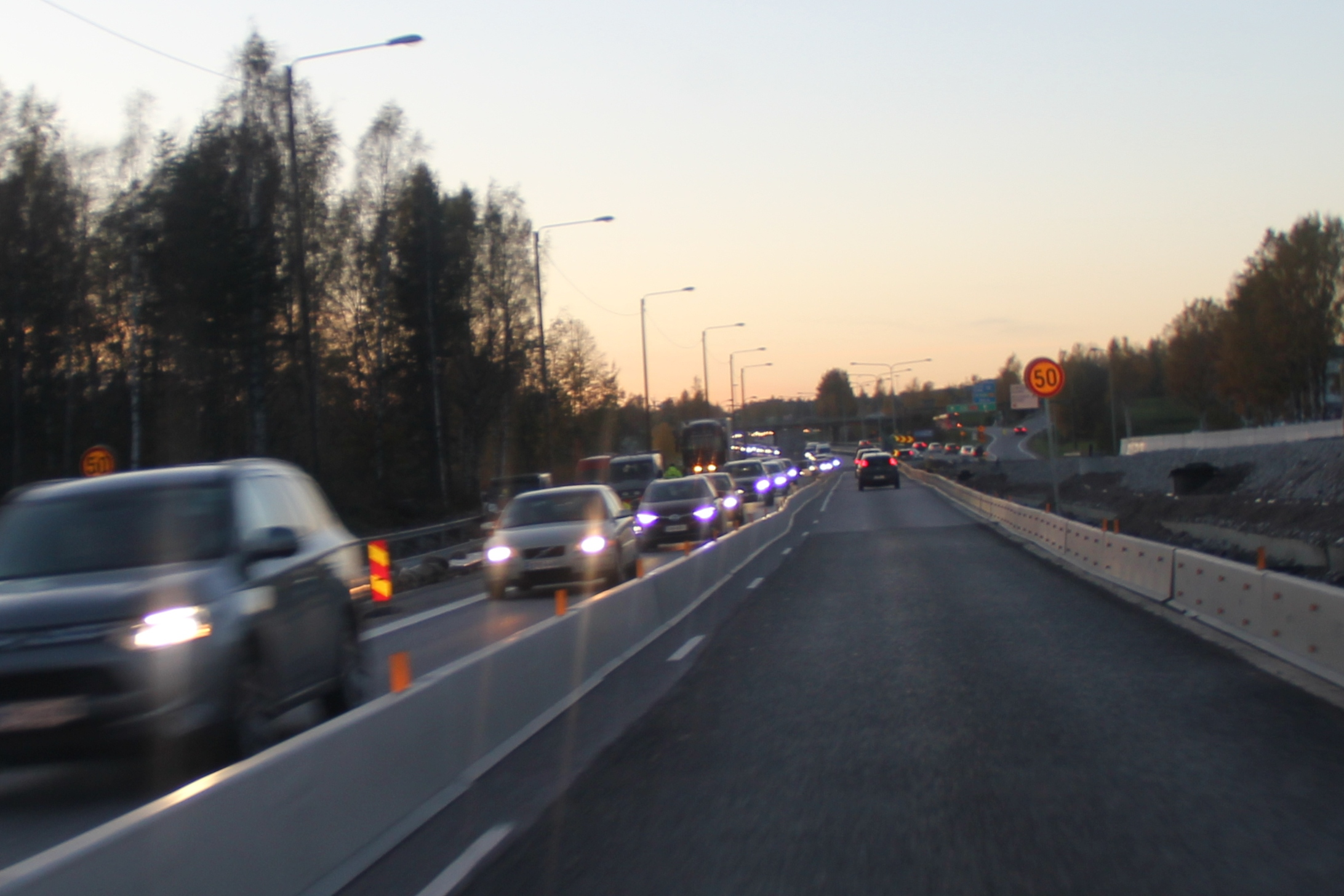
Valtatie 1 by Kirkkojärvi, 15 October 2017, when the water from the lake flooded the road during construction works.

Valtatie 1 has lowered 1-2 meters around Kirkkojärvi since its construction. This is due to the soft clay in the soil around the lake. In 2011 and 2017 water has risen to the road. After the flooding in 2011 it was decided that the road must be raised. The work was ongoing when the road flooded again in 2017. The amount of water was so high, that two lanes of the road had to be closed. This caused extensive traffic jams in the area.
