= Kenttäpiispa =

Field bishop (Finnish: Kenttäpiispa; Swedish: Fältbiskop) is a military rank and position within the Finnish Defence Forces. The field bishop is the leader of both Lutheran and Orthodox priests and deacons serving in the army as military chaplains. The office was founded by President Risto Ryti in 1941. The position of field bishop is comparable to that of a brigadier general.

Though the field bishop is styled "bishop" and is a member of the Synod of Bishops of the Evangelical Lutheran Church of Finland, he is not a "bishop" in the doctrinal sense of the term. Field bishops are not ordained as bishops and cannot in turn ordain priests. Their jurisdiction, the Finnish Defence Forces, does not constitute a diocese, and military chaplains belong to the dioceses of their assigned stations. Similarly, the service members belong to the parishes of their domiciles.

== Field Bishops of the Finnish Defence Forces ==
- Johannes Björklund 1941–1956
- Toivo Laitinen 1956–1969
- Yrjö Massa 1969–1978
- Viljo Remes 1978–1986
- Jorma Laulaja 1986–1995
- Hannu Niskanen 1995–2012
- Pekka Särkiö 2012–2023
- Pekka Asikainen 2023–present

== Insignia ==
On the collar

On the shoulder

== See also ==
- Chaplain general
- Evangelical Lutheran Church of Finland
- Finnish Orthodox Church
- Finnish Defence Forces
