= Espoo Cathedral =

Coordinates: 60°12′33″N 024°39′08″E

- Espoon tuomiokirkko Esbo domkyrka
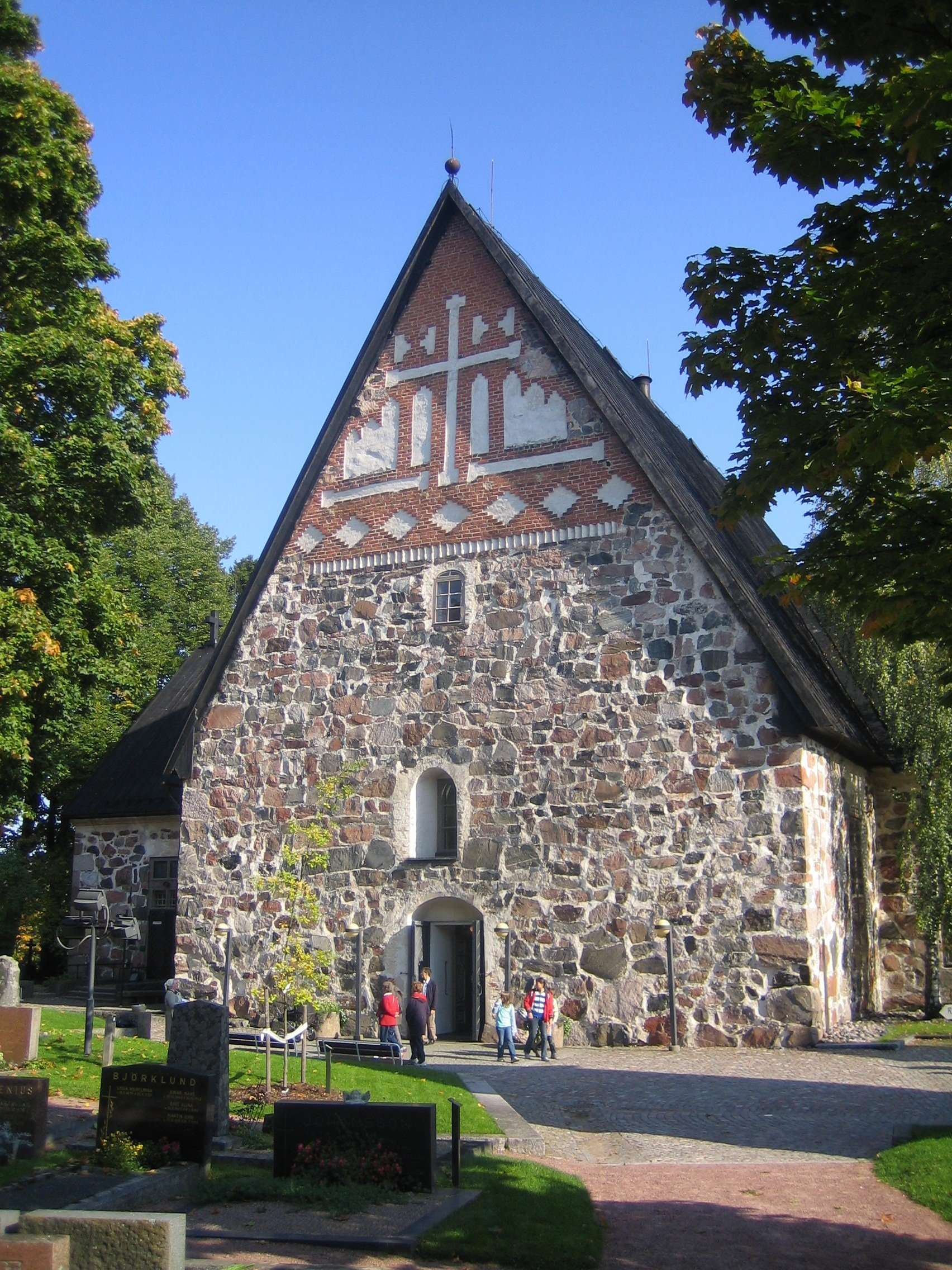
- Espoo Cathedral, view from the west
- Location: Espoo, Uusimaa
- Country: Finland
- Denomination: Evangelical Lutheran Church of Finland
- Previous denomination: Catholic Church (prior to the Swedish Reformation)
- Website: Website of the Cathedral

History
- Status: Cathedral

Administration
- Diocese: Espoo

Clergy
- Bishop: Kaisamari Hintikka 2019–

Espoo Cathedral (Finnish: Espoon tuomiokirkko, Swedish: Esbo domkyrka) is a medieval parish church and cathedral in Espoo, Finland. It is the seat of the Evangelical Lutheran Diocese of Espoo, established in 2004. The cathedral is located in the district of Espoon keskus, near the Espoonjoki river. The oldest parts of the church were completed in the 1480s and it is thus the oldest preserved building in the city.

The church became a cathedral in 2004 after the Diocese of Espoo was split off from the Diocese of Helsinki. The cathedral grounds include a graveyard, a vicarage and a parish hall completed in 1995. In addition to being the seat of the Diocese of Espoo, it serves as the church for the Espoo Cathedral Parish and hosts various concerts and other events including the "Organ Night and Aria" concert series.

== History ==
The church was originally designed in the late 15th century by an unknown "Espoo master" and built between 1485 and 1490 under his supervision. The only remaining parts of the medieval church are the eastern and western parts of the nave. The weapons room was removed between 1804 and 1806 and certain other parts of the church, including the original sacristy, were taken apart between 1821 and 1823 when the building was converted into a more spacious cruciform church.

The vaults and walls of the older parts of the cathedral are decorated with murals, largely painted in the 1510s, that depict both biblical scenes and events in the daily life of the people. The paintings were covered in the 18th century as they were thought to be "crude and superstitious" but uncovered again and conserved during renovations in 1931. The current campanile of the cathedral was completed in 1767 and its top part was redone between 1868 and 1869.

== Image gallery ==
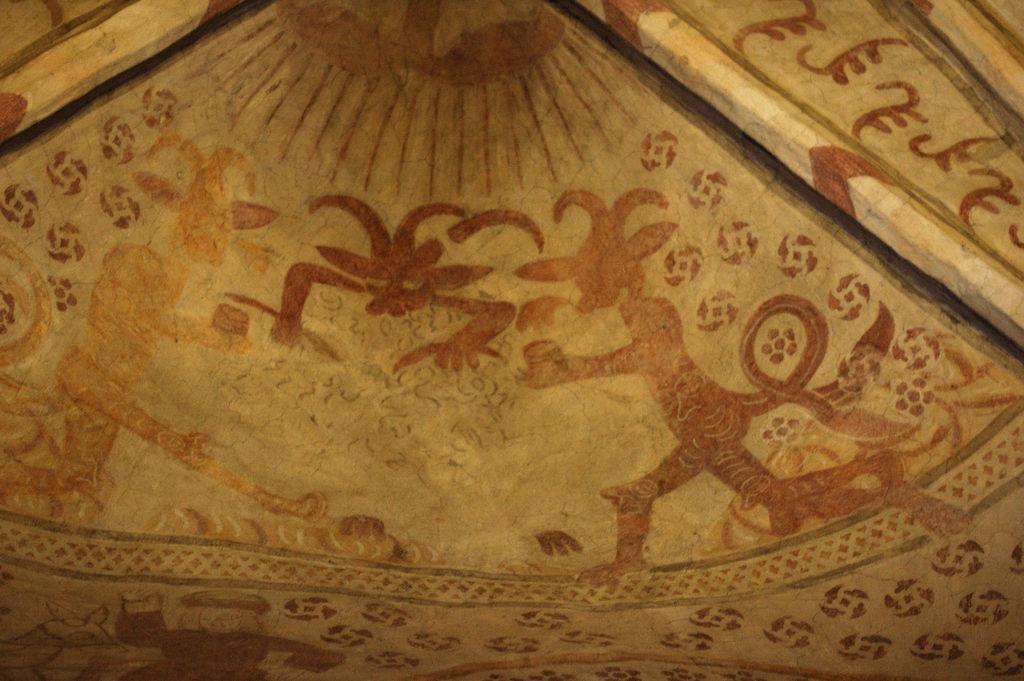
Fresco

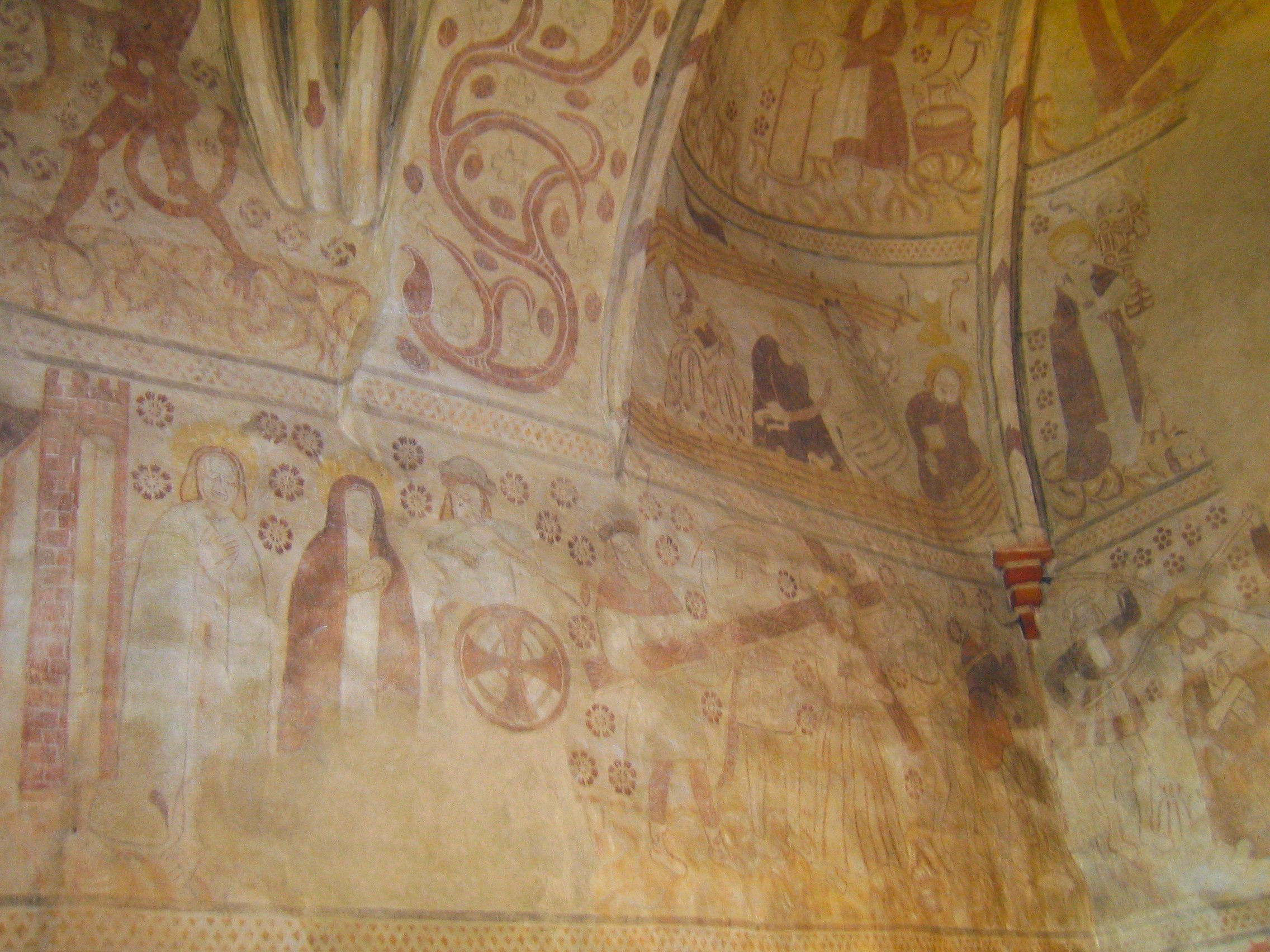
Frescos

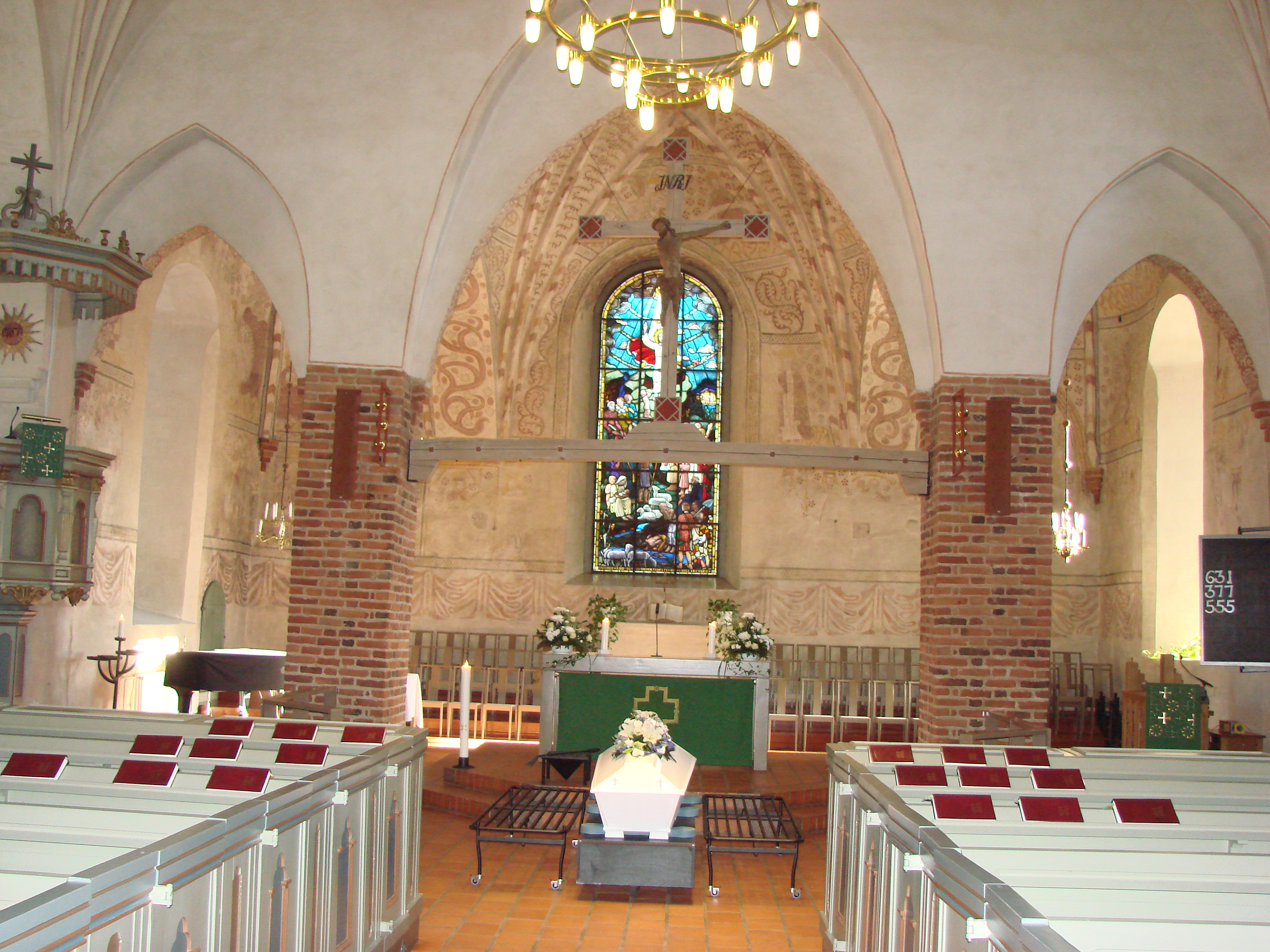
Interior

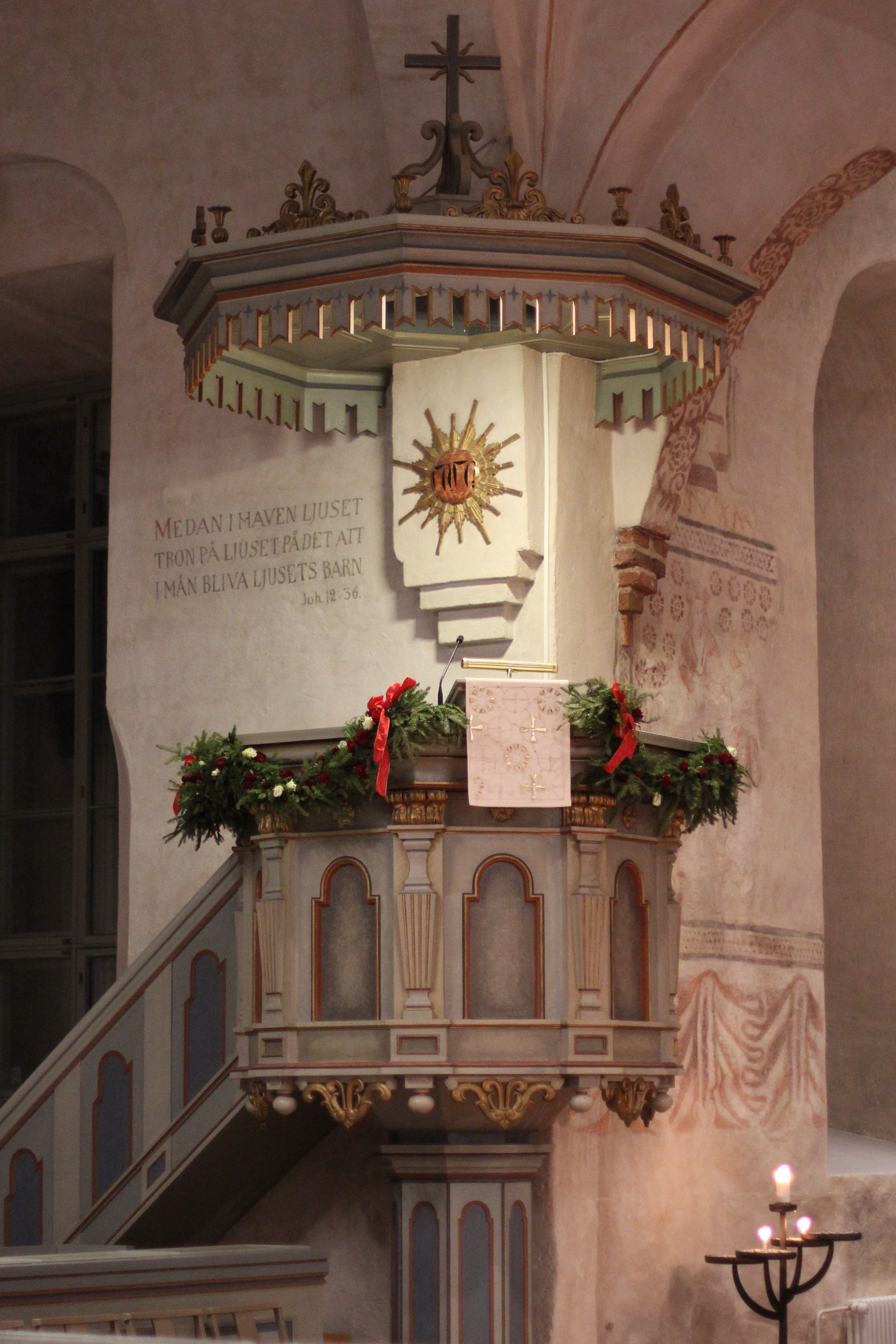
Pulpit

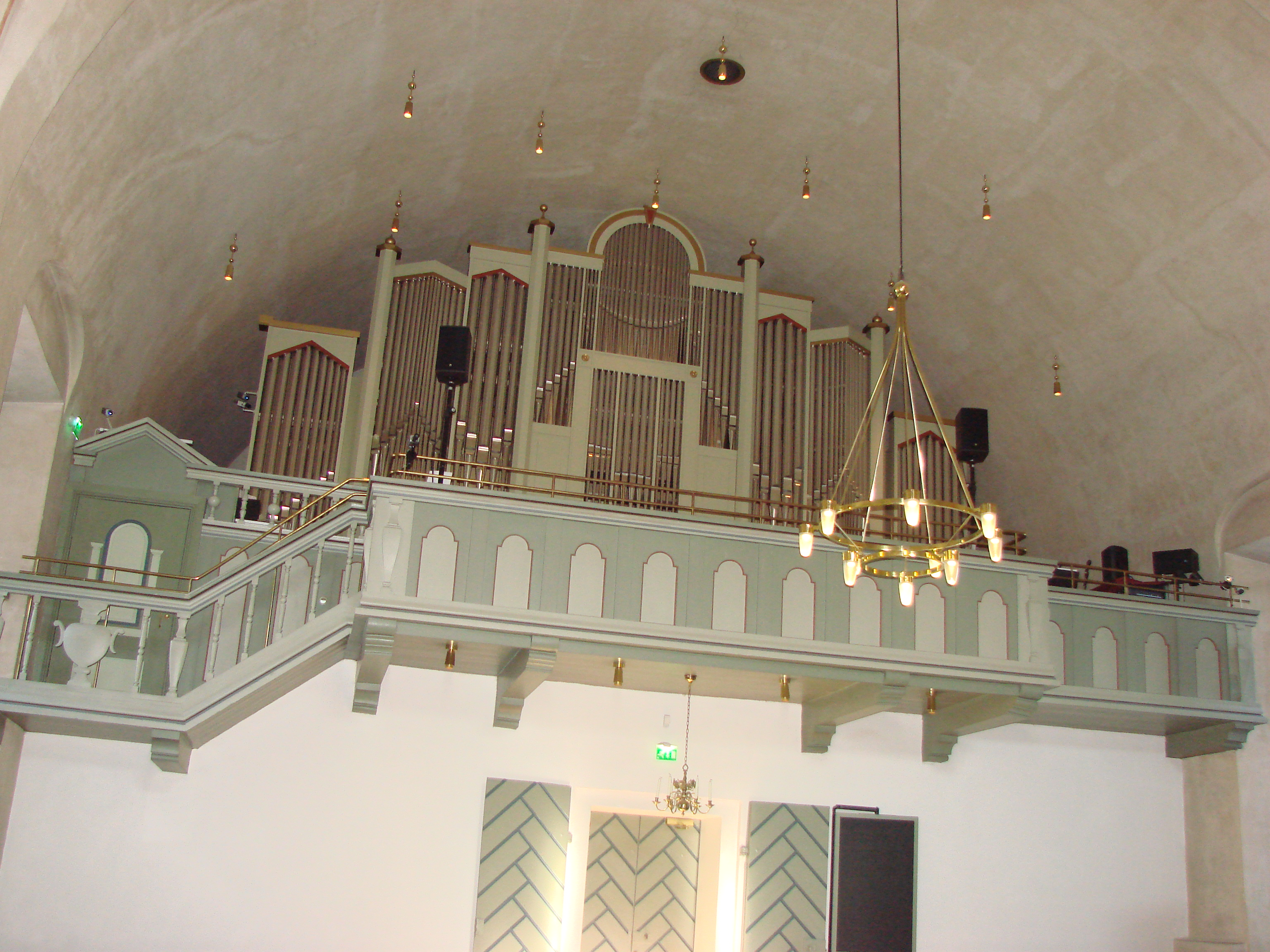
Organ

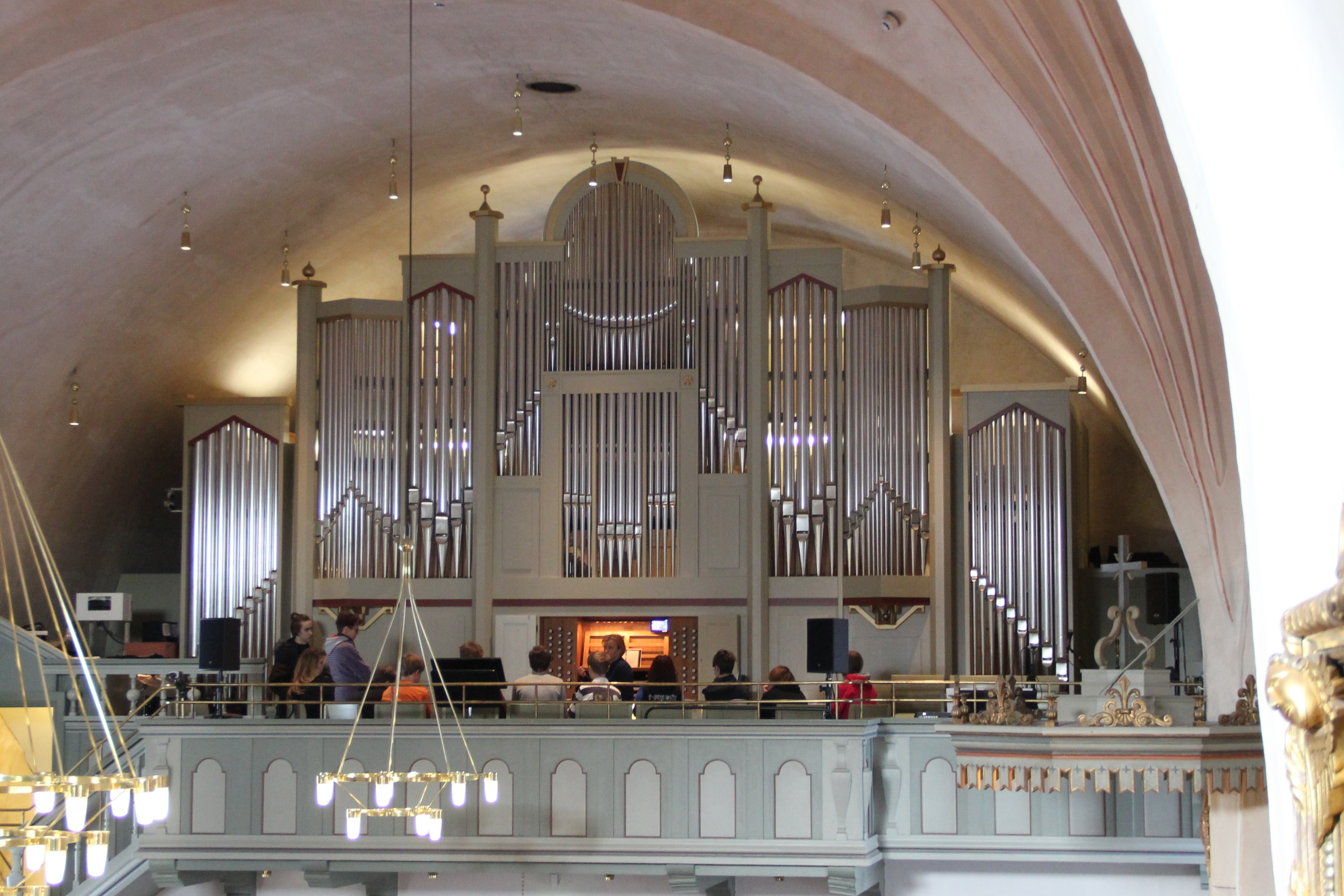
Organ

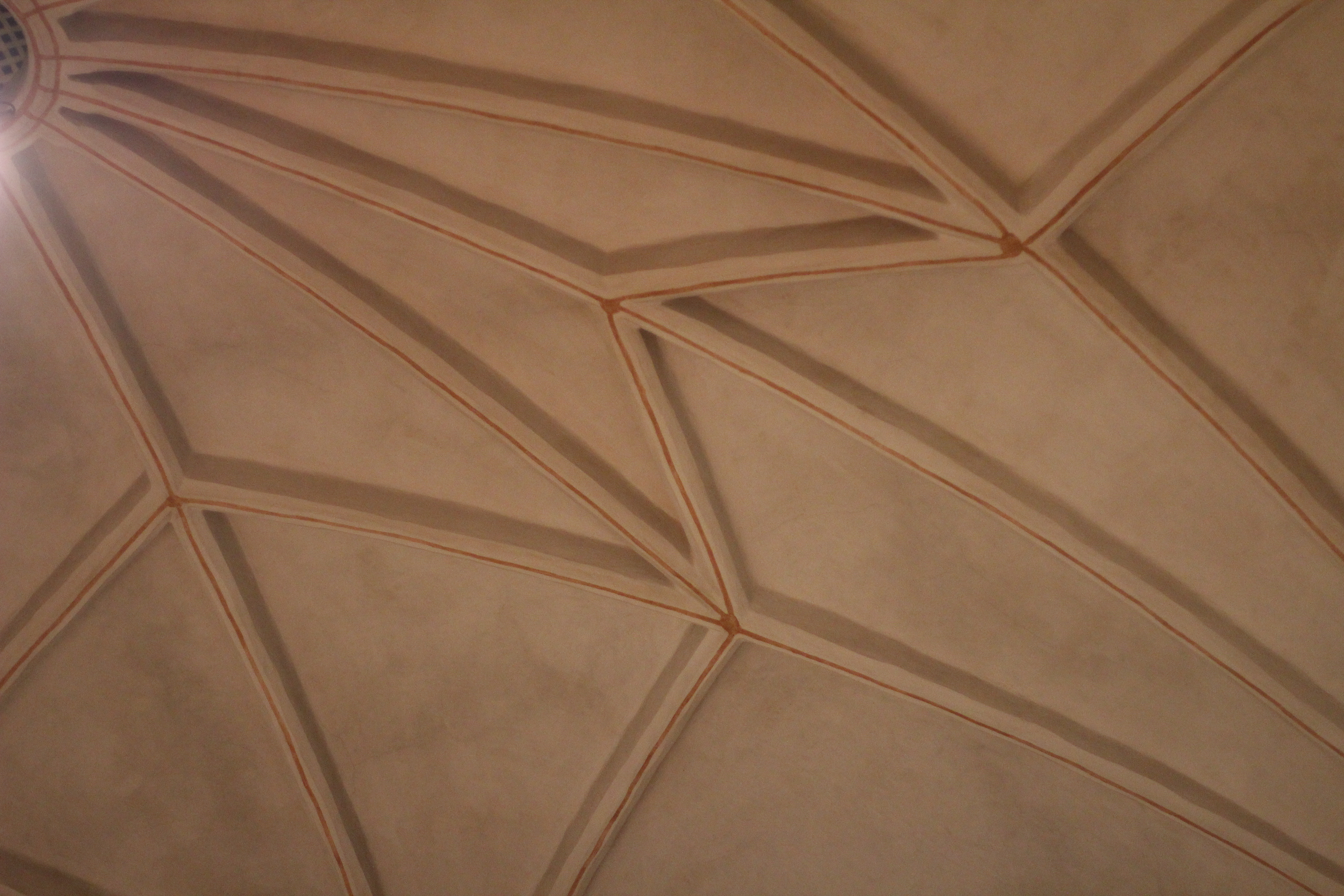
Vault

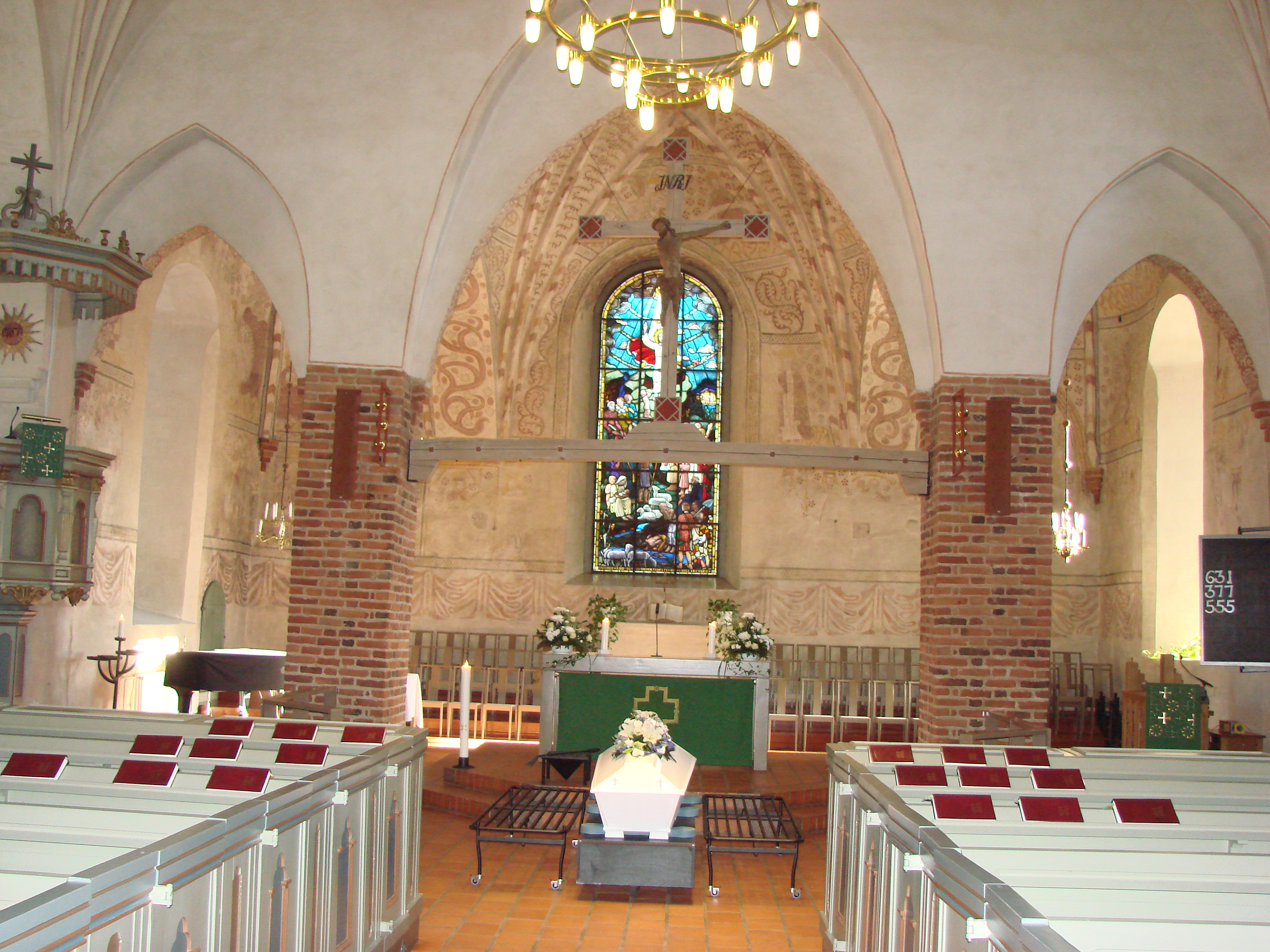
View from pew
