= Bishop of Helsinki =

Bishop of Helsinki may refer to the diocesan bishop of one of these Finnish dioceses, each with its see in Helsinki:

- Evangelical Lutheran Diocese of Helsinki
- Roman Catholic Diocese of Helsinki
- Finnish Orthodox Diocese of Helsinki, Finland (see Finnish Orthodox Church).
