= Helsinki Cathedral =

- Helsingin tuomiokirkko, Suurkirkko (in Finnish); Helsingfors domkyrka, Storkyrkan (in Swedish)
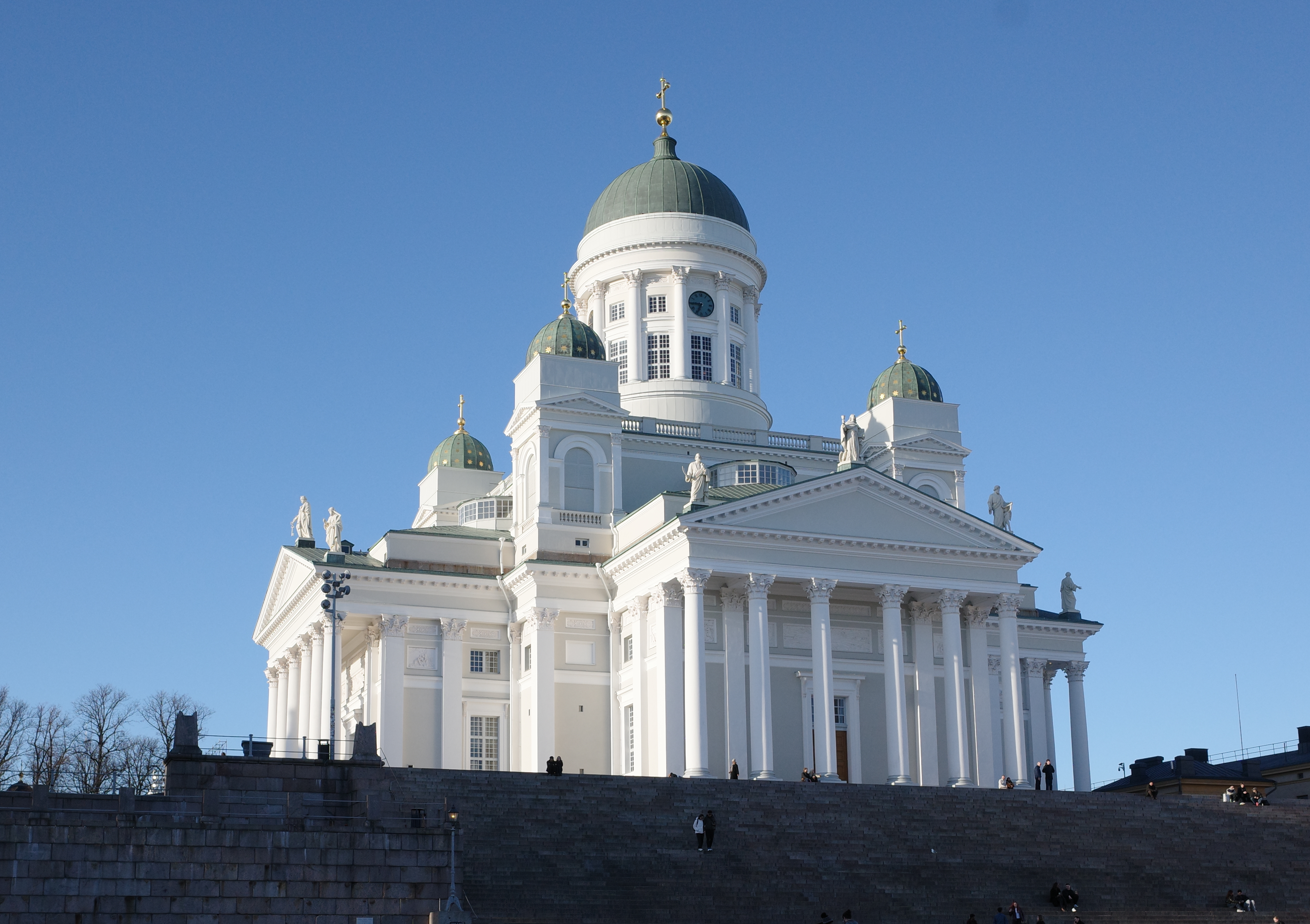
- Helsinki Cathedral
- 60°10′13″N 024°57′08″E
- Location: Kruununhaka, Helsinki, Finland
- Denomination: Evangelical Lutheran Church of Finland
- Website: helsingintuomiokirkko.fi

History
- Status: Cathedral
- Dedication: St Nicholas

Architecture
- Architect(s): Carl Ludvig Engel; later altered by Ernst Lohrmann
- Style: Neoclassical
- Groundbreaking: 1830
- Completed: 1852

Specifications
- Capacity: 1,300 seats

Administration
- Diocese: Helsinki

Clergy
- Bishop: Teemu Laajasalo

Helsinki Cathedral (Finnish: Helsingin tuomiokirkko, Suurkirkko; Swedish: Helsingfors domkyrka, Storkyrkan) is the Finnish Evangelical Lutheran cathedral of the Diocese of Helsinki, located in the neighborhood of Kruununhaka in the centre of Helsinki, Finland, at the Senate Square. The church was originally built from 1830 to 1852 as a tribute to the Grand Duke of Finland, Emperor Nicholas I of Russia. It was also known as St Nicholas's Church (Finnish: Nikolainkirkko, Swedish: Nikolajkyrkan) until Finland declared its full independence in 1917. It is a major landmark of the city, and one of the most famous historical structures in Finland as a whole when viewed globally.

== Description ==
A distinctive landmark in the Helsinki cityscape, with its tall, green dome surrounded by four smaller domes, the building is in the neoclassical style. It was designed by Carl Ludvig Engel as the climax of his Senate Square layout: it is surrounded by other, smaller buildings designed by him.

The church's plan is a Greek cross (a square centre and four equilateral arms), symmetrical in each of the four cardinal directions, with each arm's facade featuring a colonnade and pediment. Engel originally intended to place a further row of columns on the western end to mark the main entrance opposite the eastern altar, but this was never built.

Although its distinctive exterior has earned it the nickname "White Cathedral," Helsinki Cathedral is actually painted in three very similar shades of light grey.

The interior is comparatively austere, reflecting its Lutheran character. The church has seating for approximately 1,300 people. The choir contains statues of the Reformers Martin Luther, Philipp Melanchthon and Mikael Agricola, the latter regarded as the Finnish Reformer. The altar is dominated by a painting depicting the burial of Jesus before his resurrection, painted by the Baltic German artist Timofey von Neff and donated by Emperor Nicholas I. Flanking the painting are statues of angels. The wooden pulpit, designed by Engel and completed in 1849, is covered with imitation marble and topped by a canopy. The cathedral's main organ, built by the Danish firm Marcussen & Søn in 1967, has 57 stops; it is complemented by a 12-stop choir organ built by the Swedish firm Åkerman & Lund in 2006.

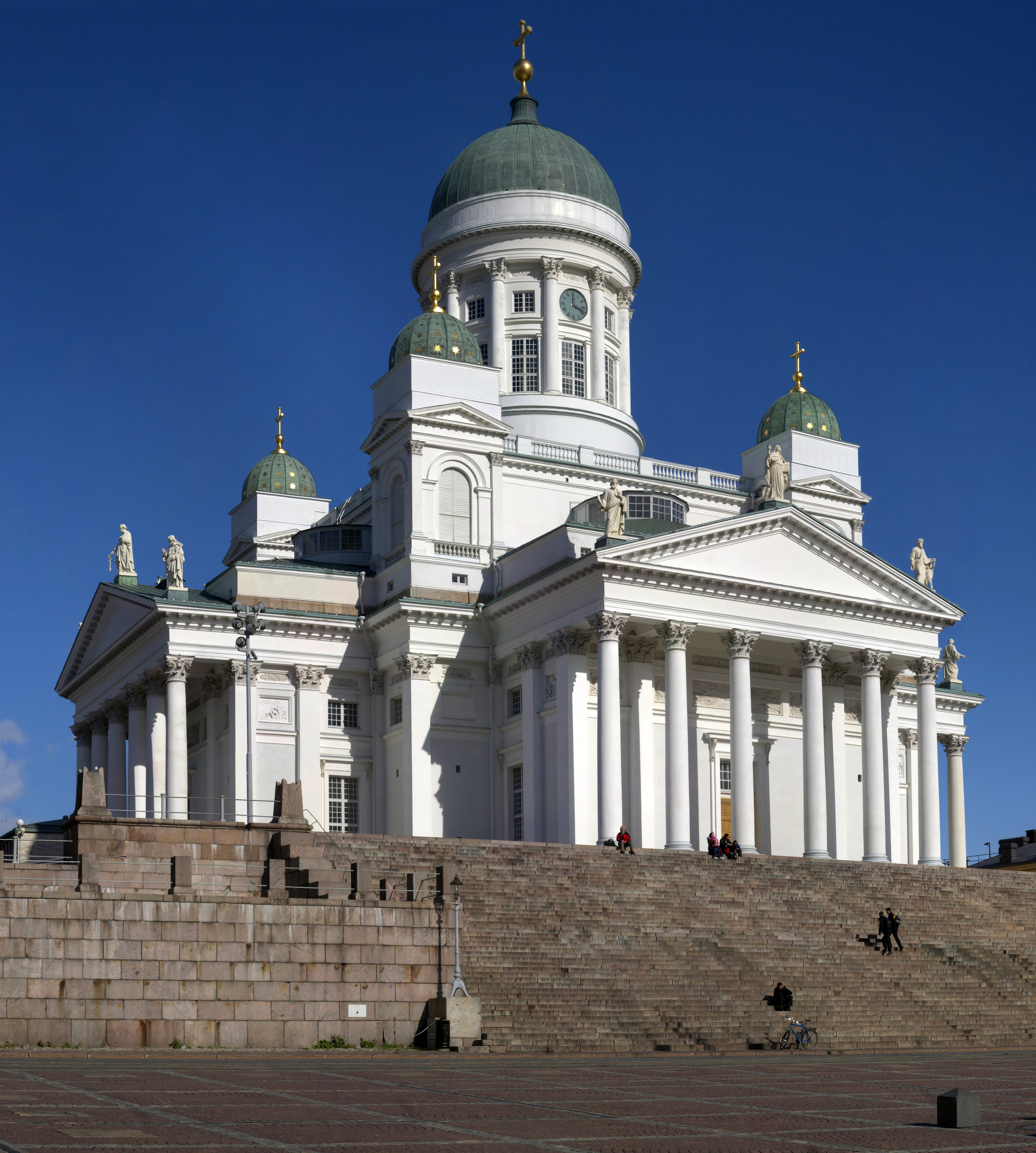
The cathedral and the steps

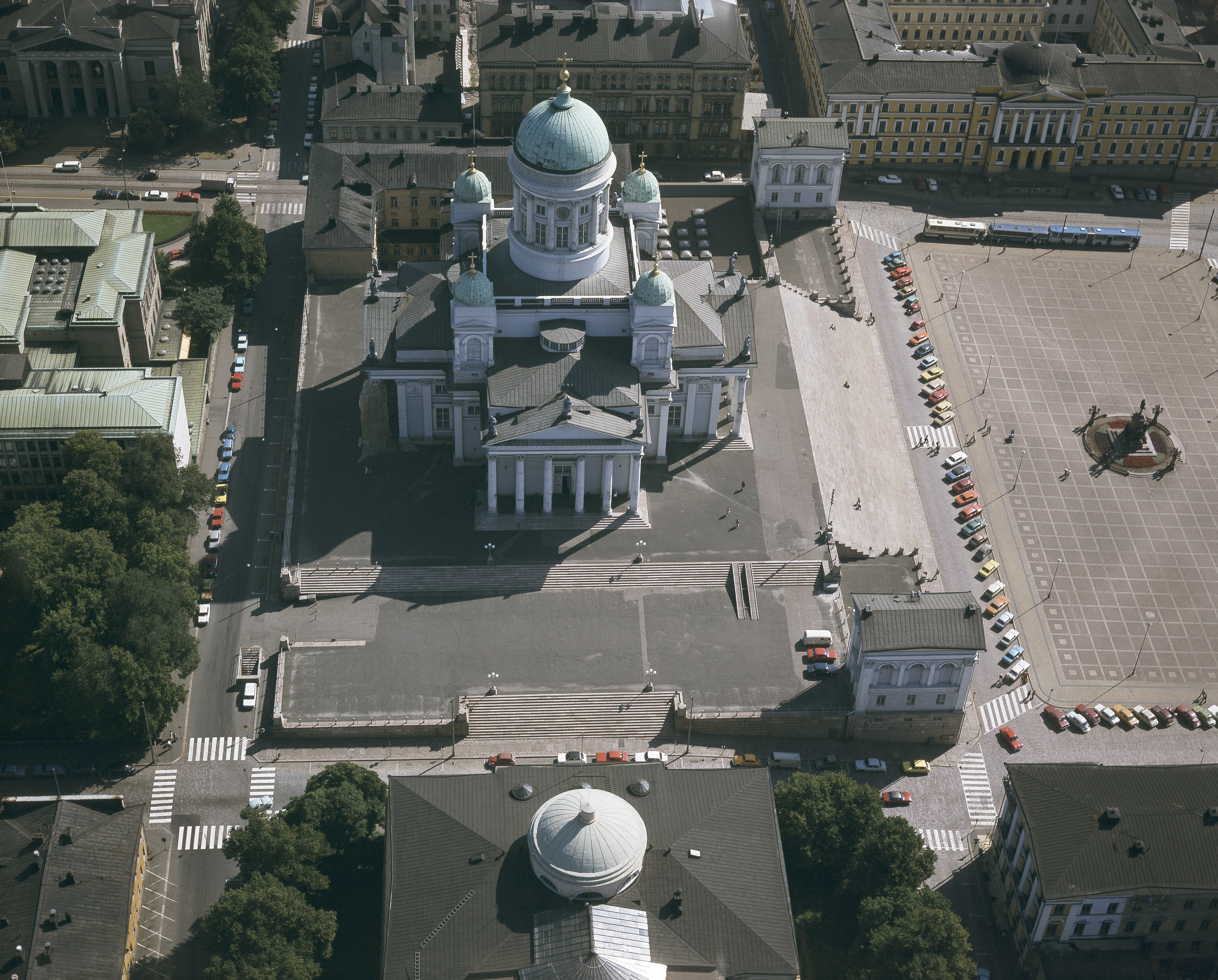
Aerial photograph from on top in 1976 that shows the shape of the cathedral

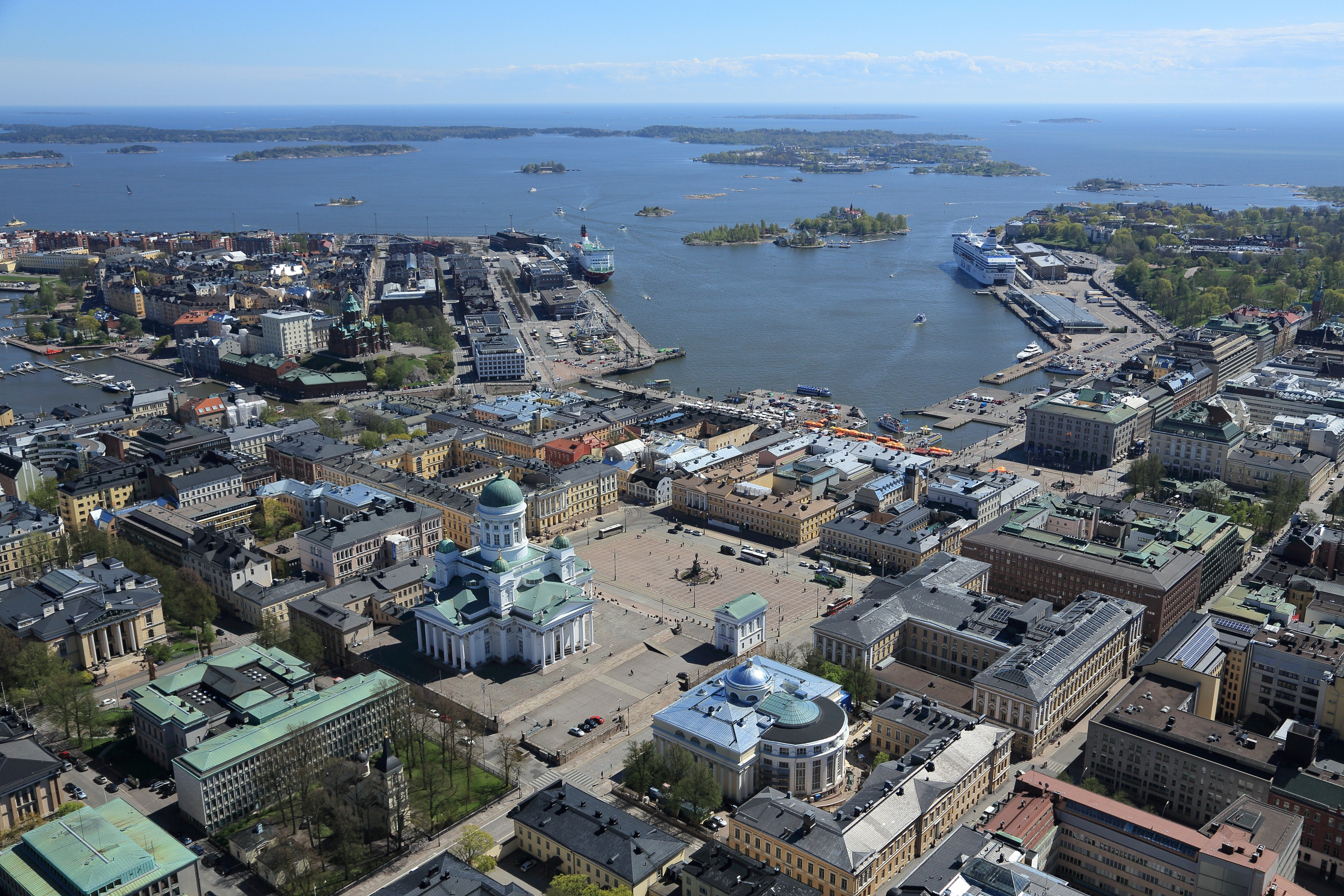
2015 aerial photograph showing the rear of the cathedral and the view to the sea

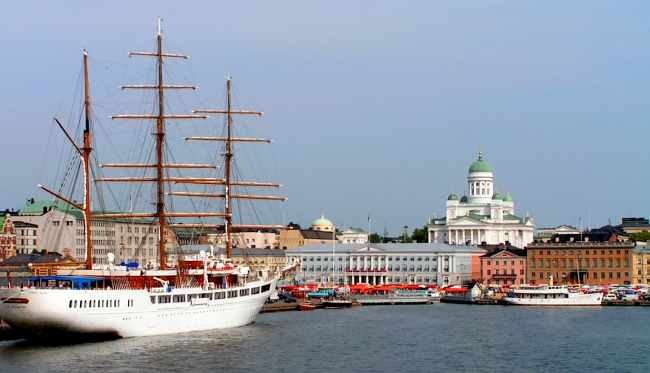
The cathedral from the sea

== History ==
After Helsinki was made into the capital of Finland in 1812, Alexander I decreed in 1814 that 15 percent of the salt import tax were to be collected into a fund for two churches, one Lutheran and one Orthodox. The cathedral was built on the site of the smaller 1724–1727 Ulrika Eleonora Church, which had been dedicated to its patroness, Ulrika Eleonora, Queen of Sweden. Helsinki Old Church was built between 1824 and 1826 in nearby Kamppi to serve the parish while the Ulrika Eleonora Church was being demolished and until the consecration of the new cathedral. The bells of the old church were reused in the cathedral. Construction of the cathedral began in 1830, although it was only officially inaugurated on 15 February 1852. Engel died in 1840.

The building was later altered by Engel's successor Ernst Lohrmann, whose four small domes emphasise the architectural connection to the cathedral's models, Saint Isaac's Cathedral and Kazan Cathedral in St. Petersburg. Lohrmann also designed two extra buildings to the sides of the steps: looking from the square the left building is a bell tower and the right building a chapel. He also erected larger-than-life sized zinc statues of the Twelve Apostles at the apexes and corners of the roofline in 1849. They were sculpted by August Wredov and Hermann Schievelbein and cast by S. P. Devaranne in Berlin in 1845–1847. The altarpiece was painted by Carl Timoleon von Neff and donated to the church by Emperor Nicholas I. The cathedral crypt was renovated in the 1980s by architects Vilhelm Helander and Juha Leiviskä for use in exhibitions and church functions; Helander was also responsible for conservation repairs on the cathedral in the late 1990s.

On 17 June 1917, during the political unrest preceding Finnish independence, followers of the anarchist Jean Boldt occupied what was then known as St Nicholas' Church after the Sunday service. They held the cathedral for approximately 18 hours before the militia cleared the building and arrested Boldt. His arrest was followed by violent disturbances in Senate Square.

After Finland became independent in 1917, the church was renamed Suurkirkko in Finnish and Storkyrkan in Swedish, meaning "Great Church." In 1959, following the establishment of the Diocese of Helsinki, it was given its present name, Helsinki Cathedral (Helsingin tuomiokirkko in Finnish and Helsingfors domkyrka in Swedish).

History
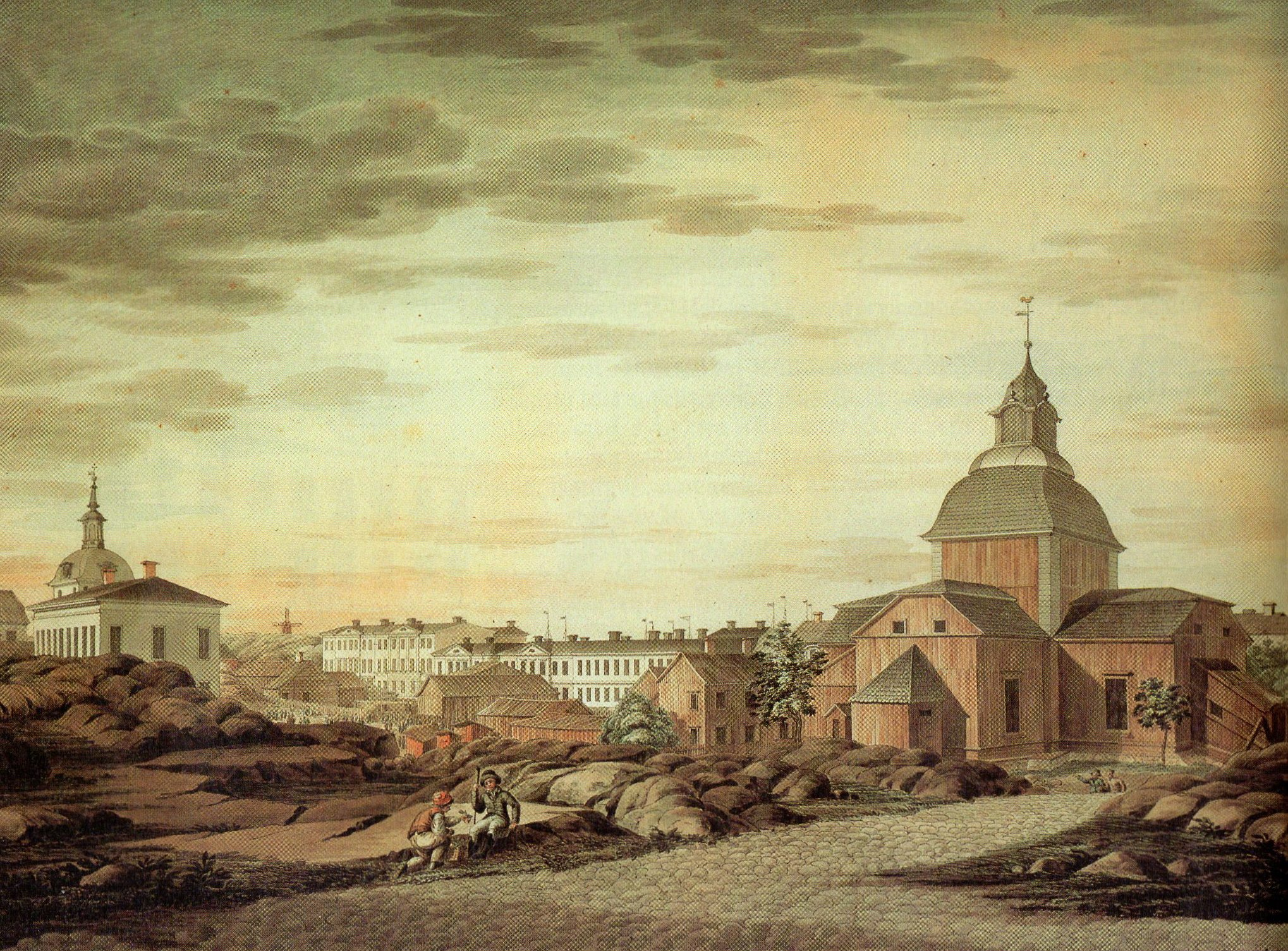
Ulrika Eleonora church in 1816–1817, roughly located at the northwest part of the square

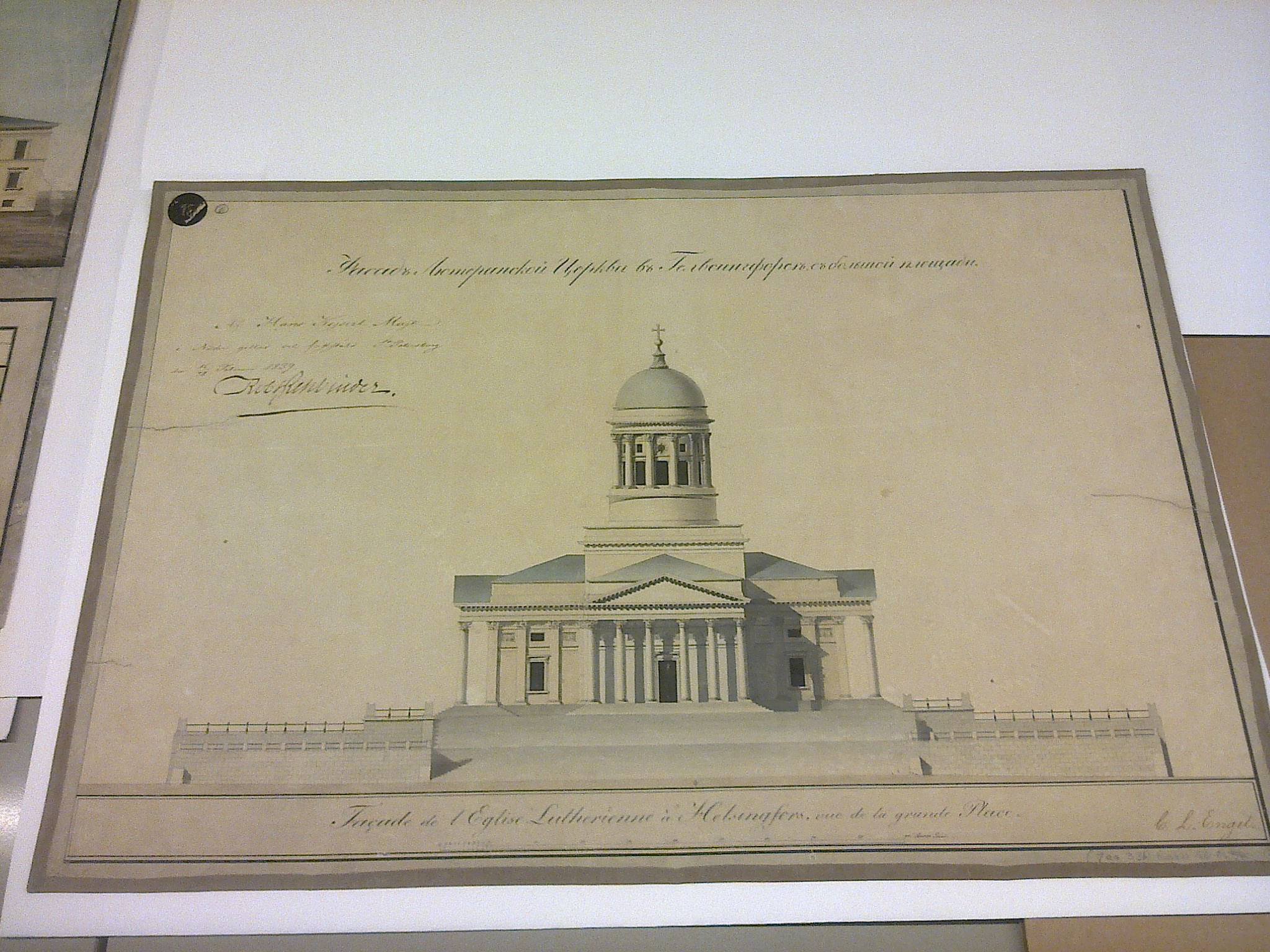
An original sketch of the cathedral by Engel

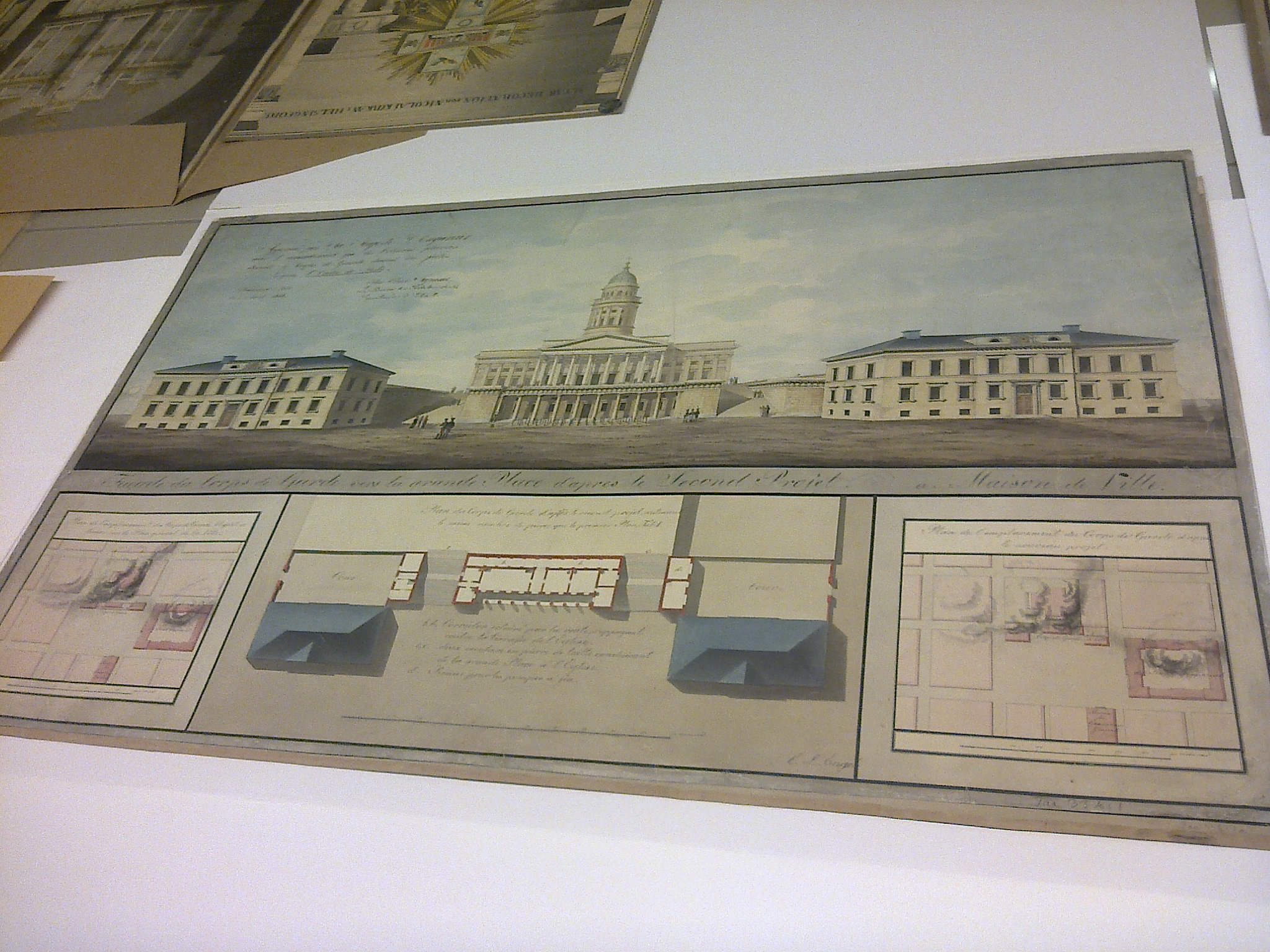
Another of Engel's sketches with accompanying buildings

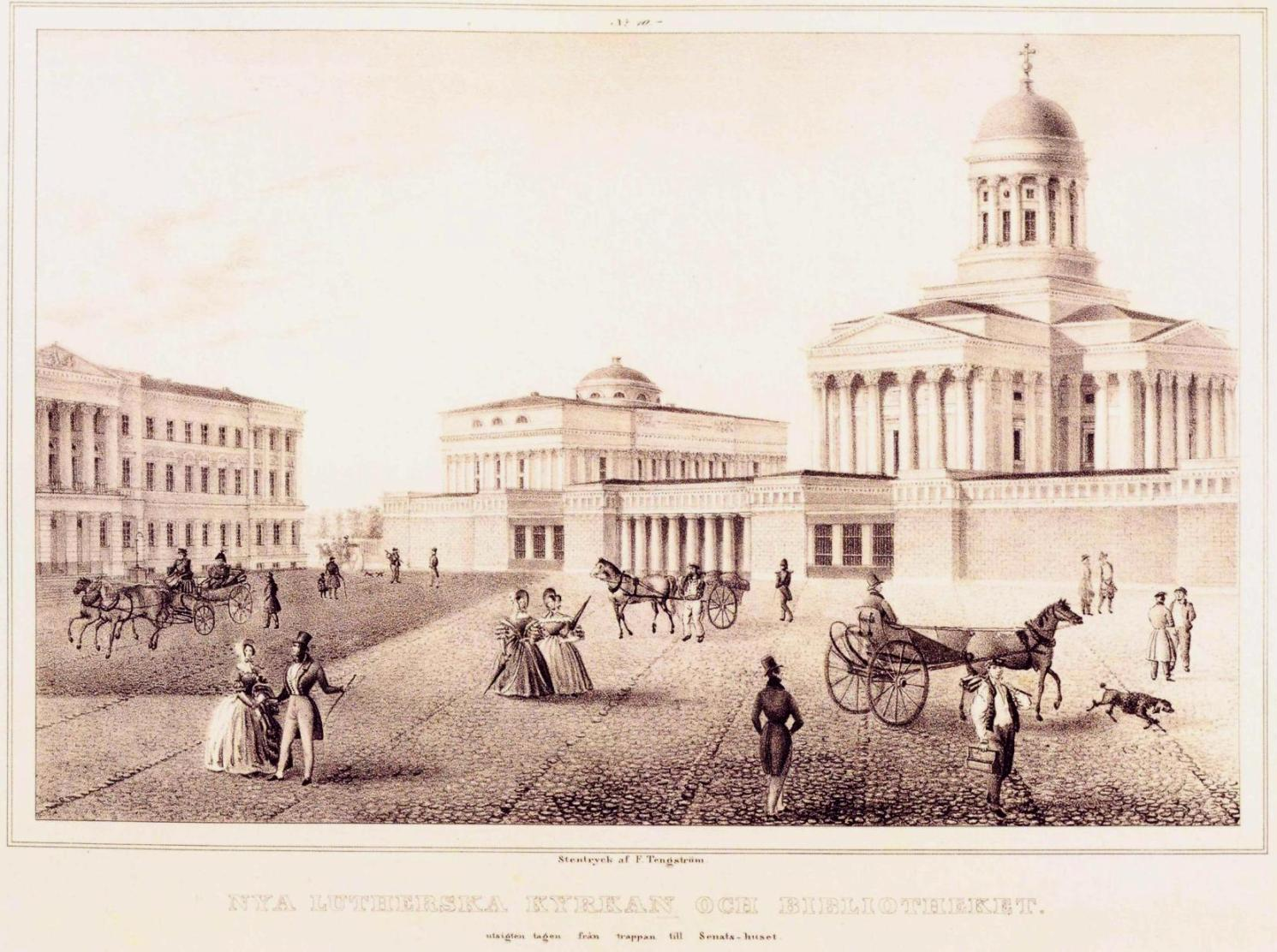
Lithograph of the church from 1838, before the side buildings were constructed. The guard building in front of the cathedral was demolished in the 1840s and replaced with the large steps.

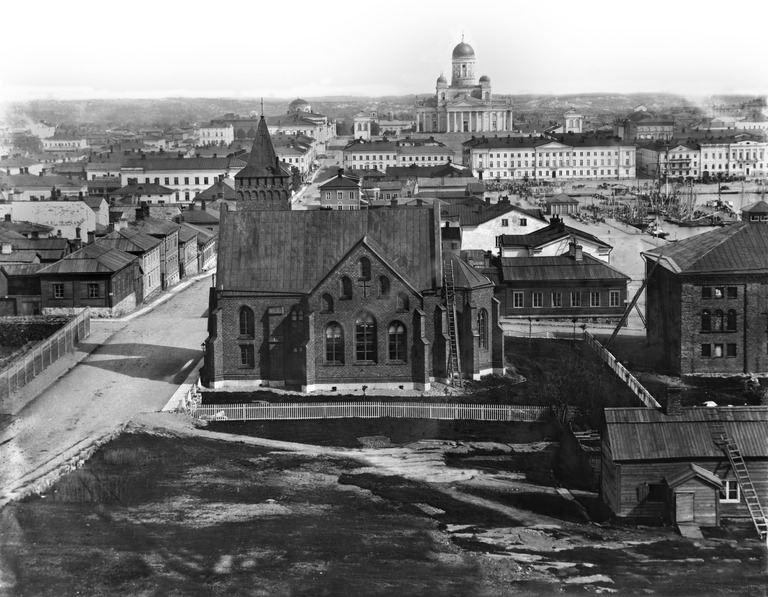
1867 photograph from the south

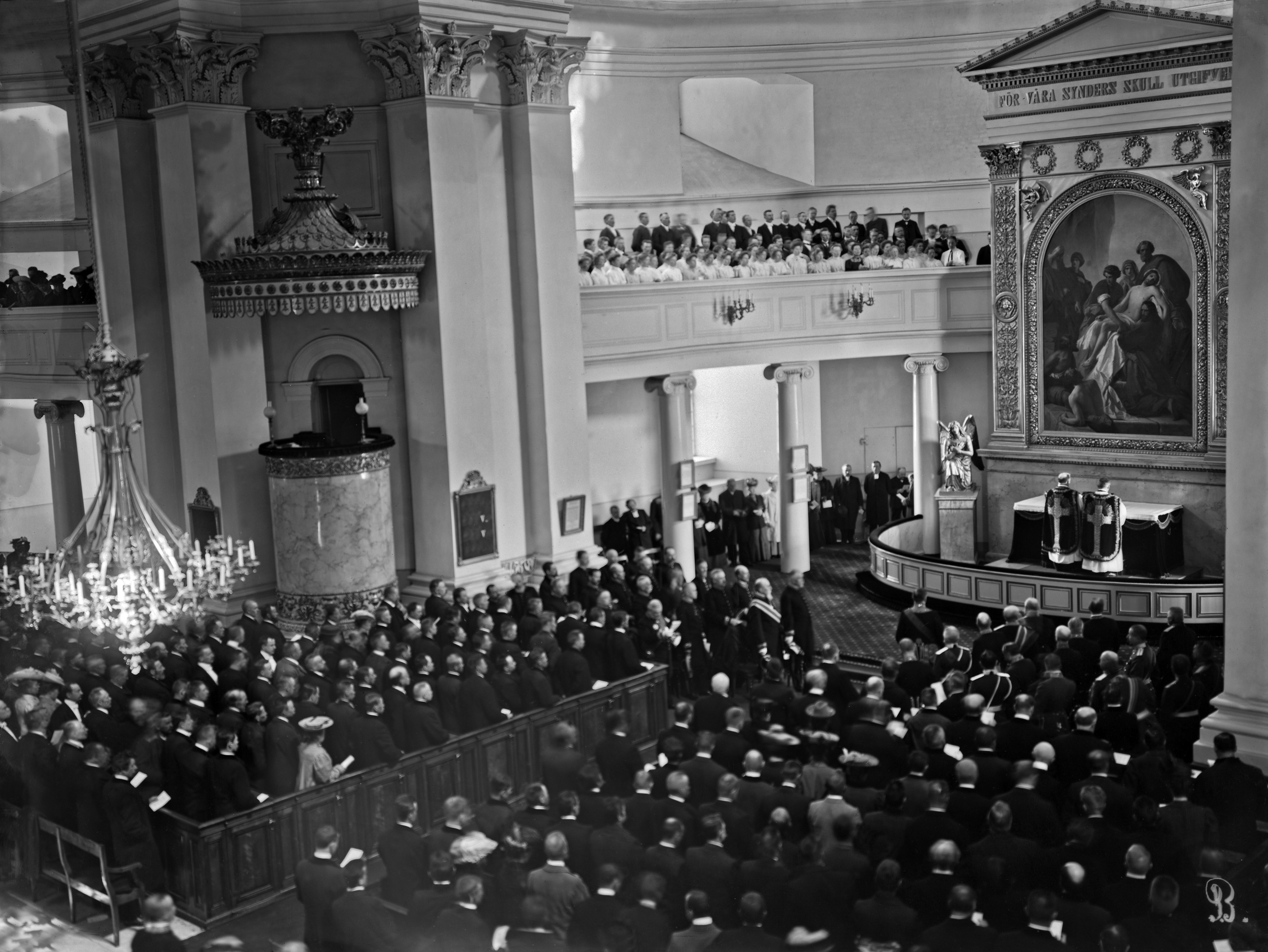
1907 service with government officials on the day of the first annual session of the Parliament of Finland

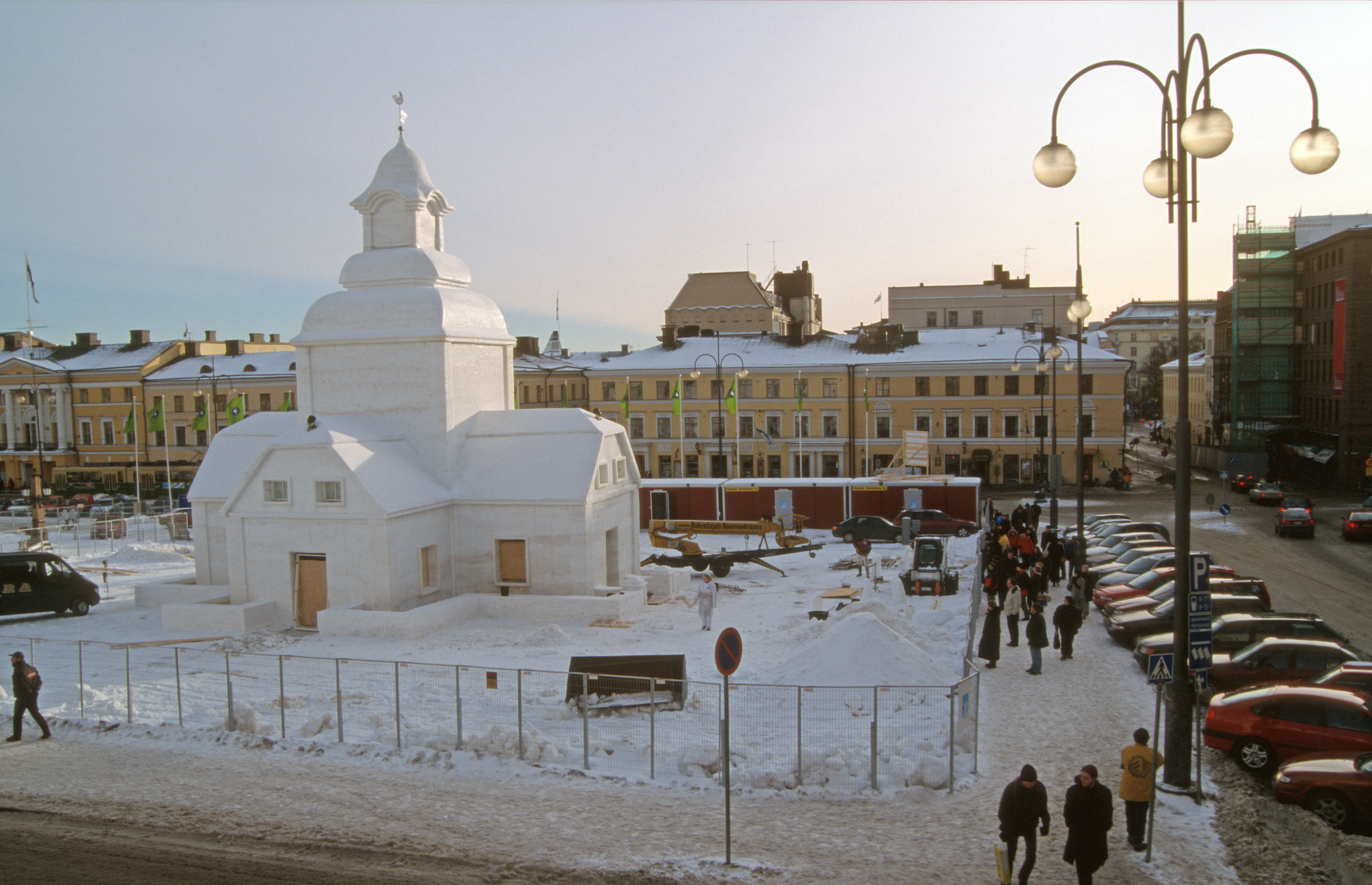
Snow sculpture version of the old Ulrika Eleonora Church being constructed on the square in 2000 (also done once before in 1997)

== Visitors ==
Helsinki Cathedral is open to visitors throughout the year, although visiting hours may vary because of church services and other events. According to the City of Helsinki, Helsinki Cathedral and its crypt received 350,000 visitors in 2025, making them one of the city's most visited tourist attractions. An admission fee is charged during the main summer visiting season, while admission is voluntary at other times of the year. Religious services and parish events remain free of charge.

During the summer, the cathedral's crypt houses Café Krypta and hosts temporary exhibitions. A seasonal café also operates in the bell tower. The cathedral offers guided tours, including tours in English, and private tours can be arranged for groups.

Finland's national Saint Lucy's Day celebrations are held at the cathedral.

== In popular culture ==
The opening sequence of the music video for "Sandstorm" by Darude was filmed on Senate Square, prominently featuring the Cathedral in the background.

== Gallery ==
Exterior details of the cathedral
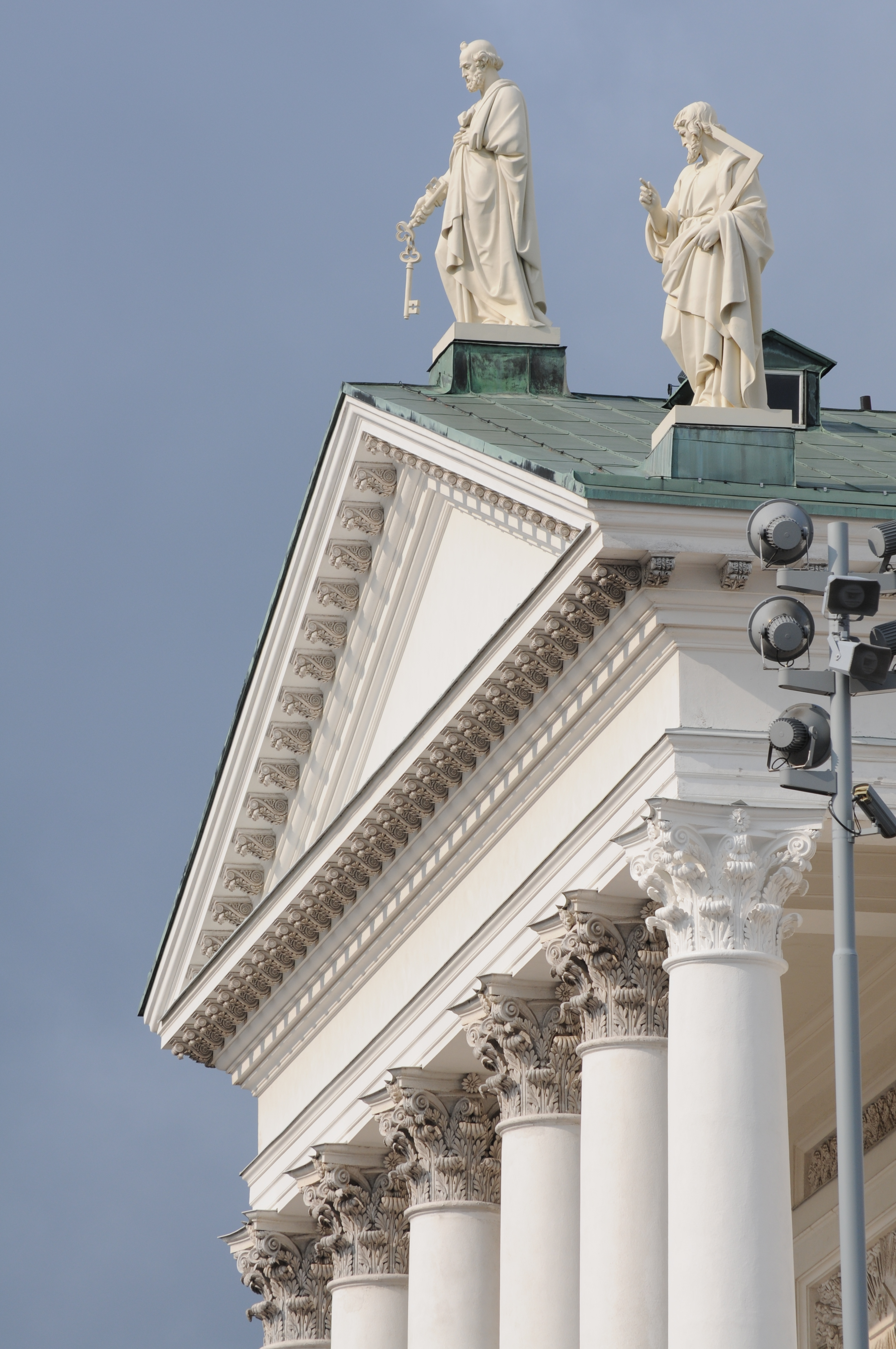
Detailing on the side

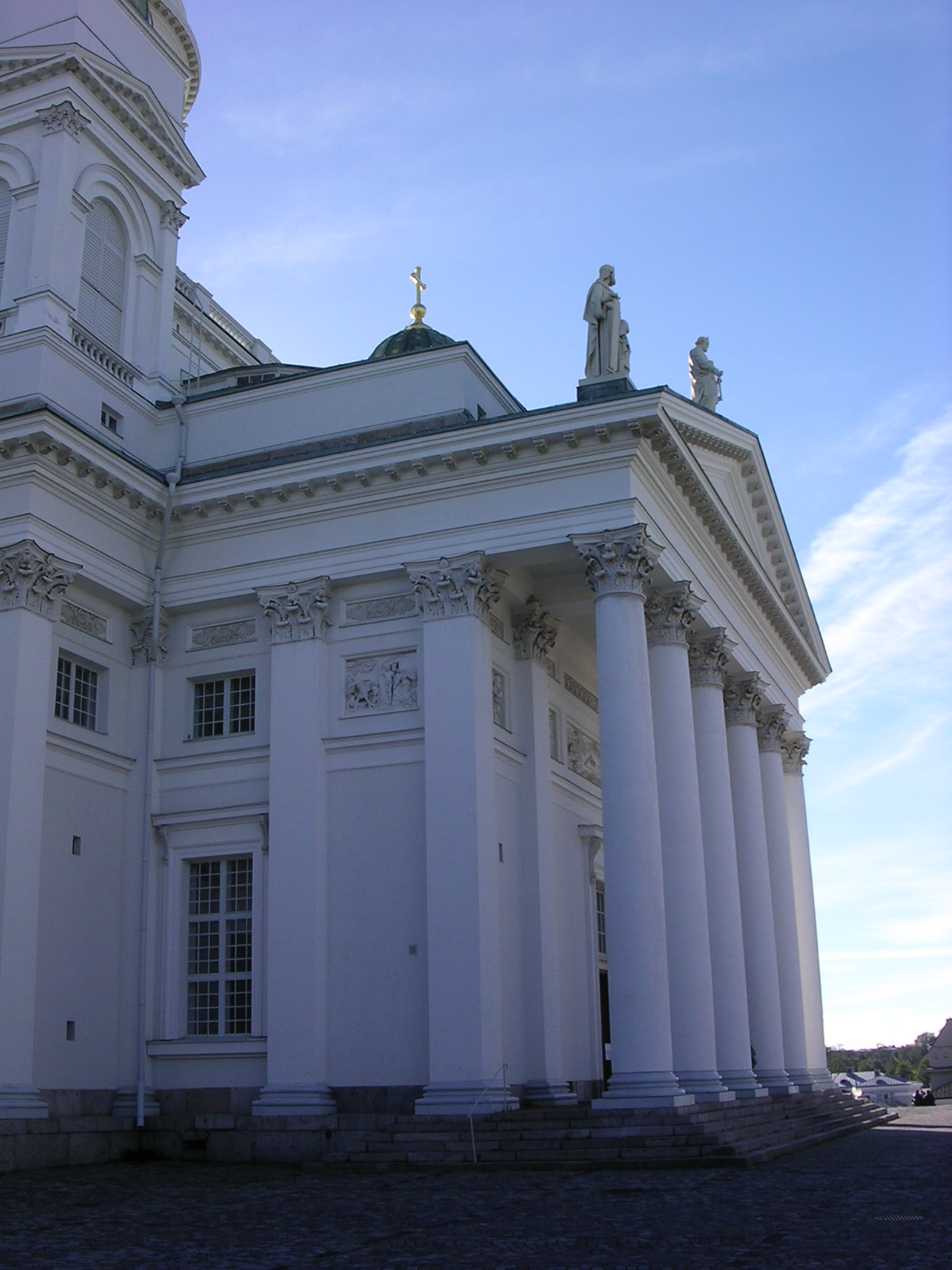
Right side

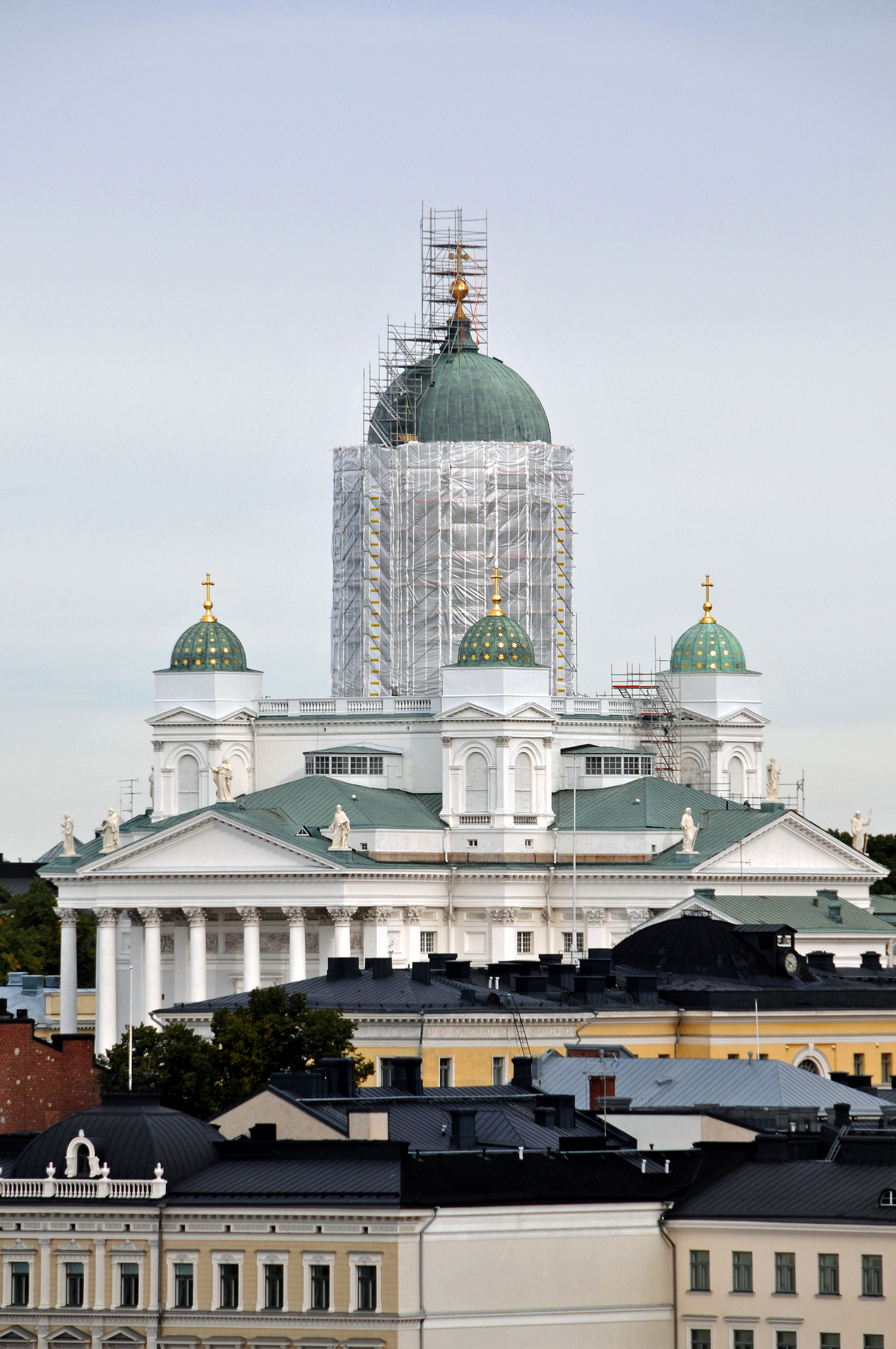
The roof going through renovations in 2009

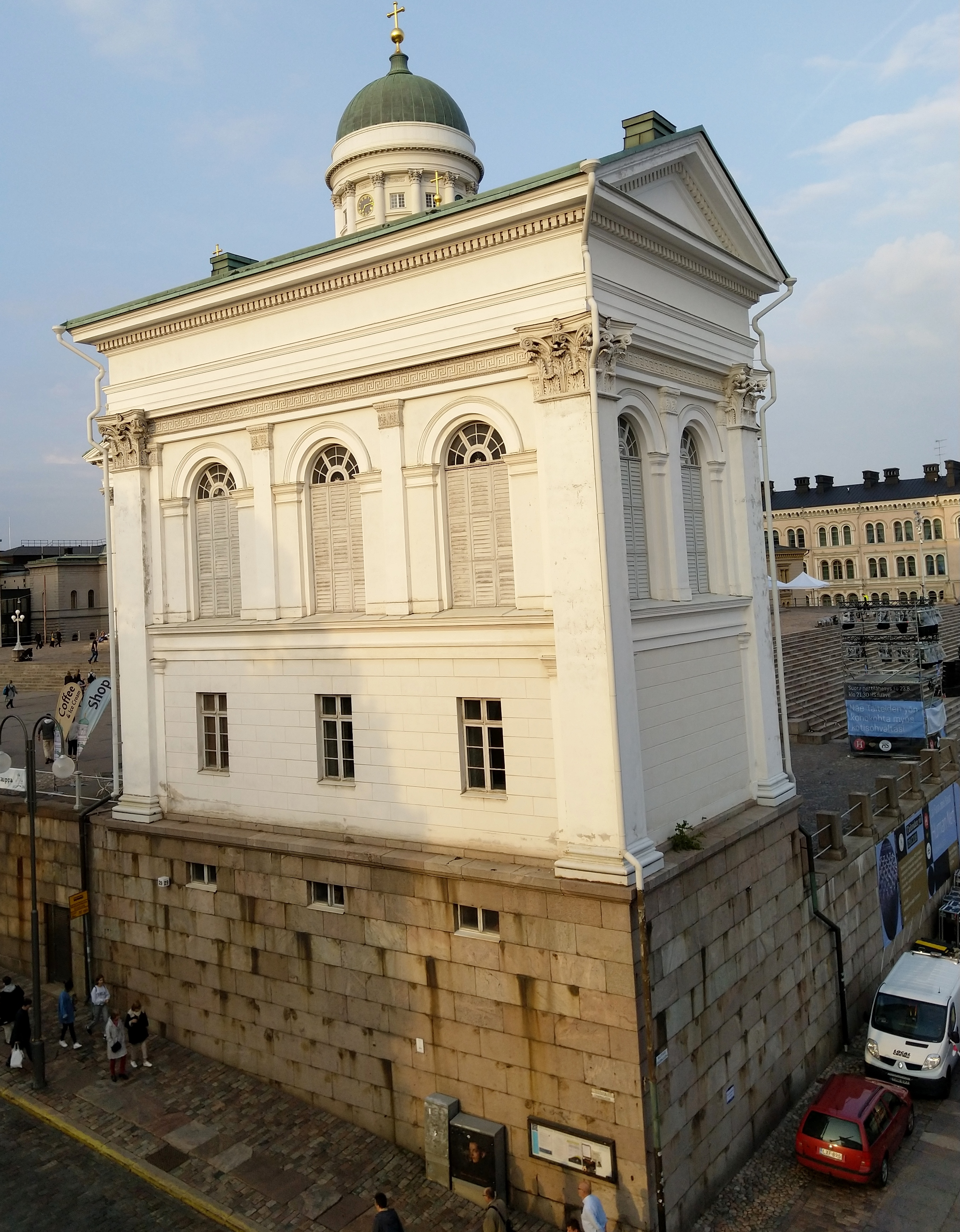
Bell tower on the left side

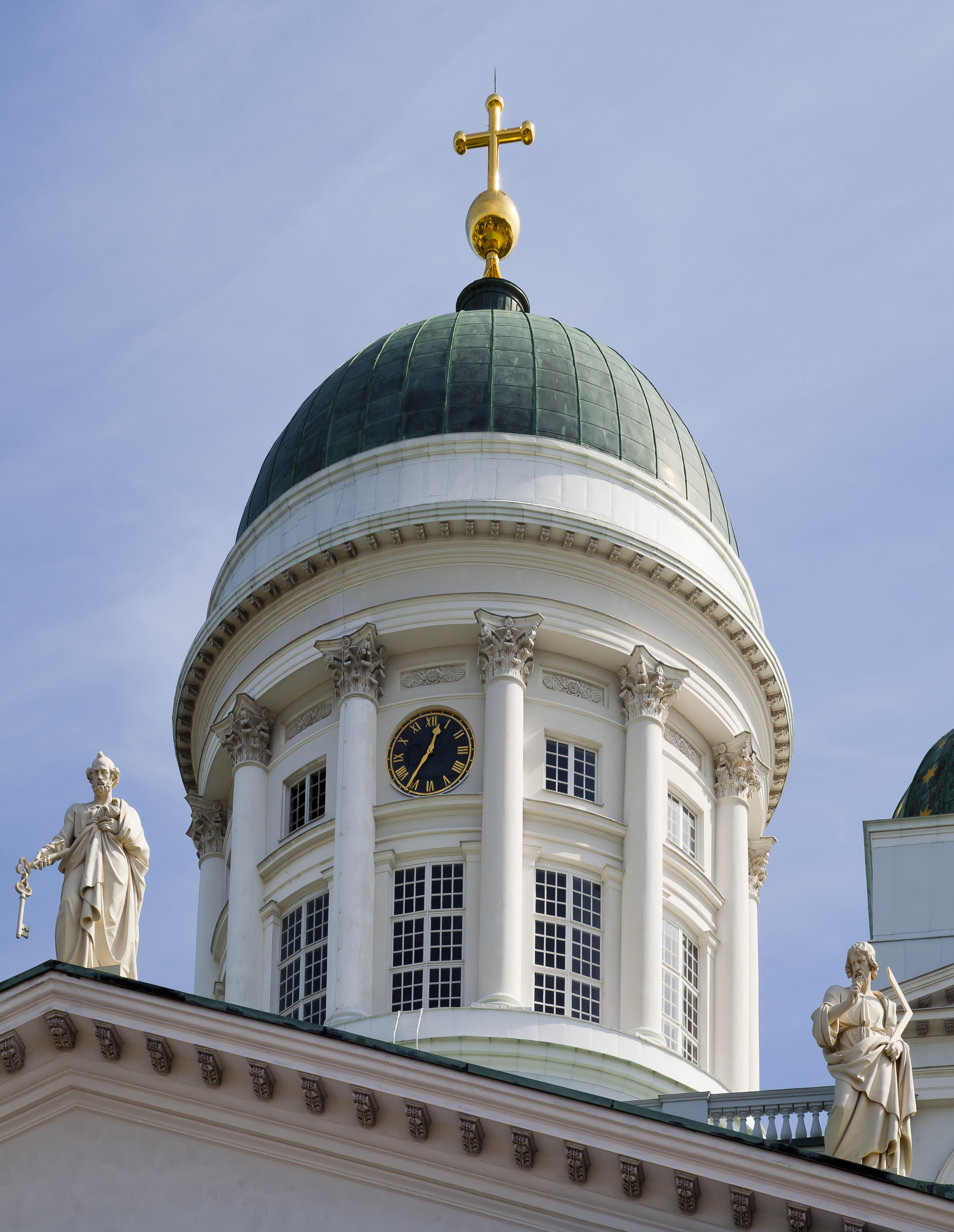
Main dome with a clock

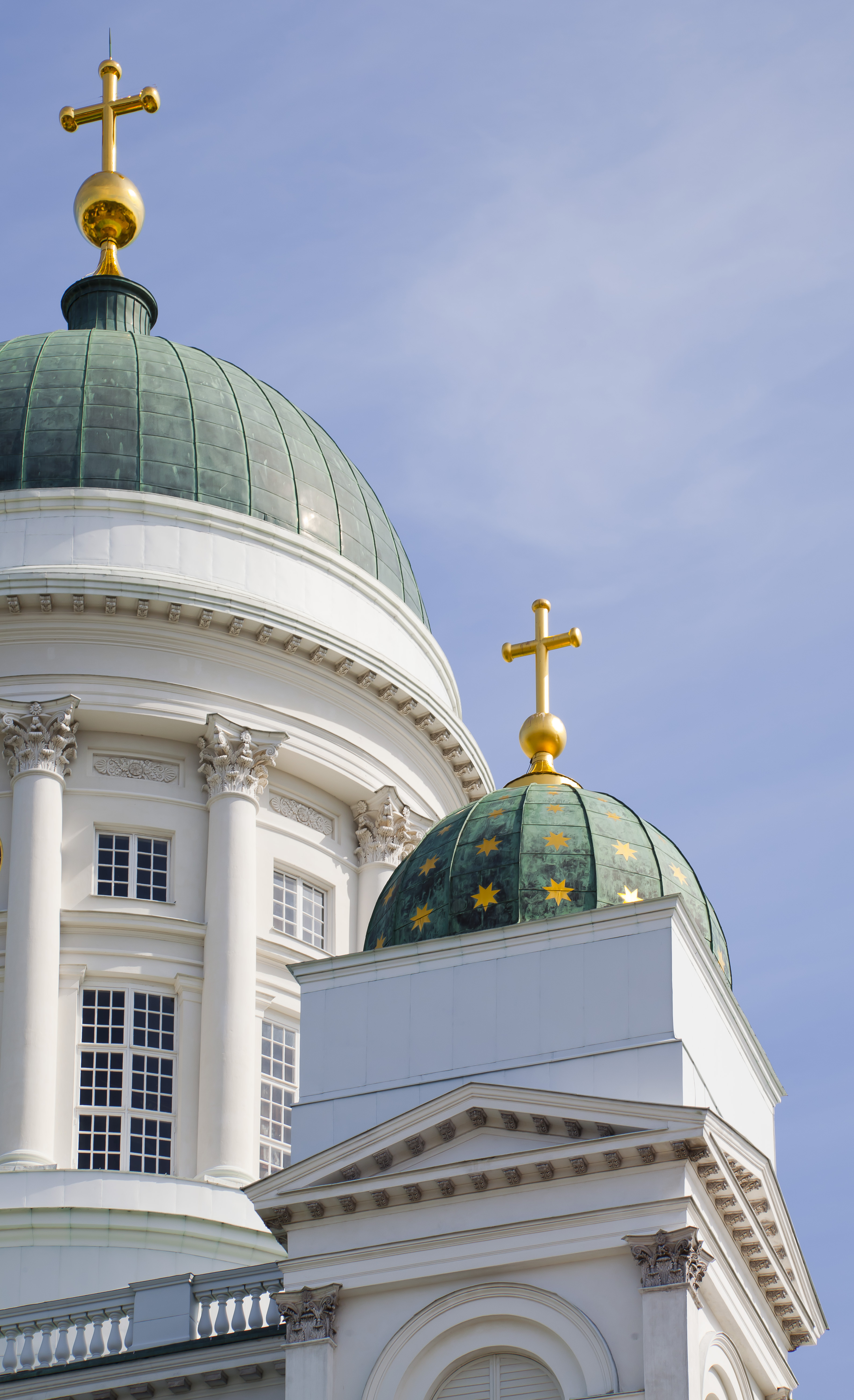
Tops of domes
12 Apostles
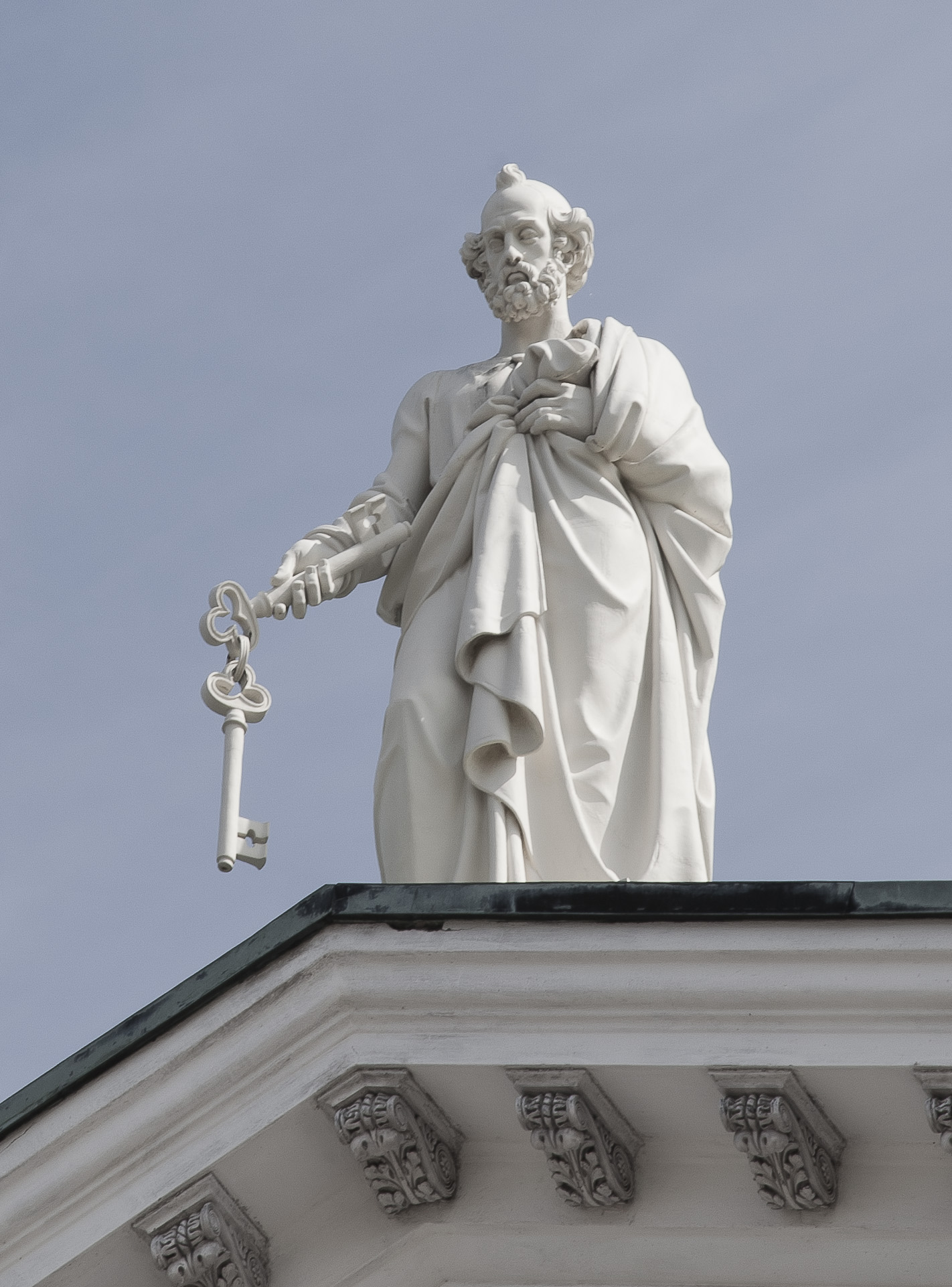
Saint Peter, carrying Keys of Heaven

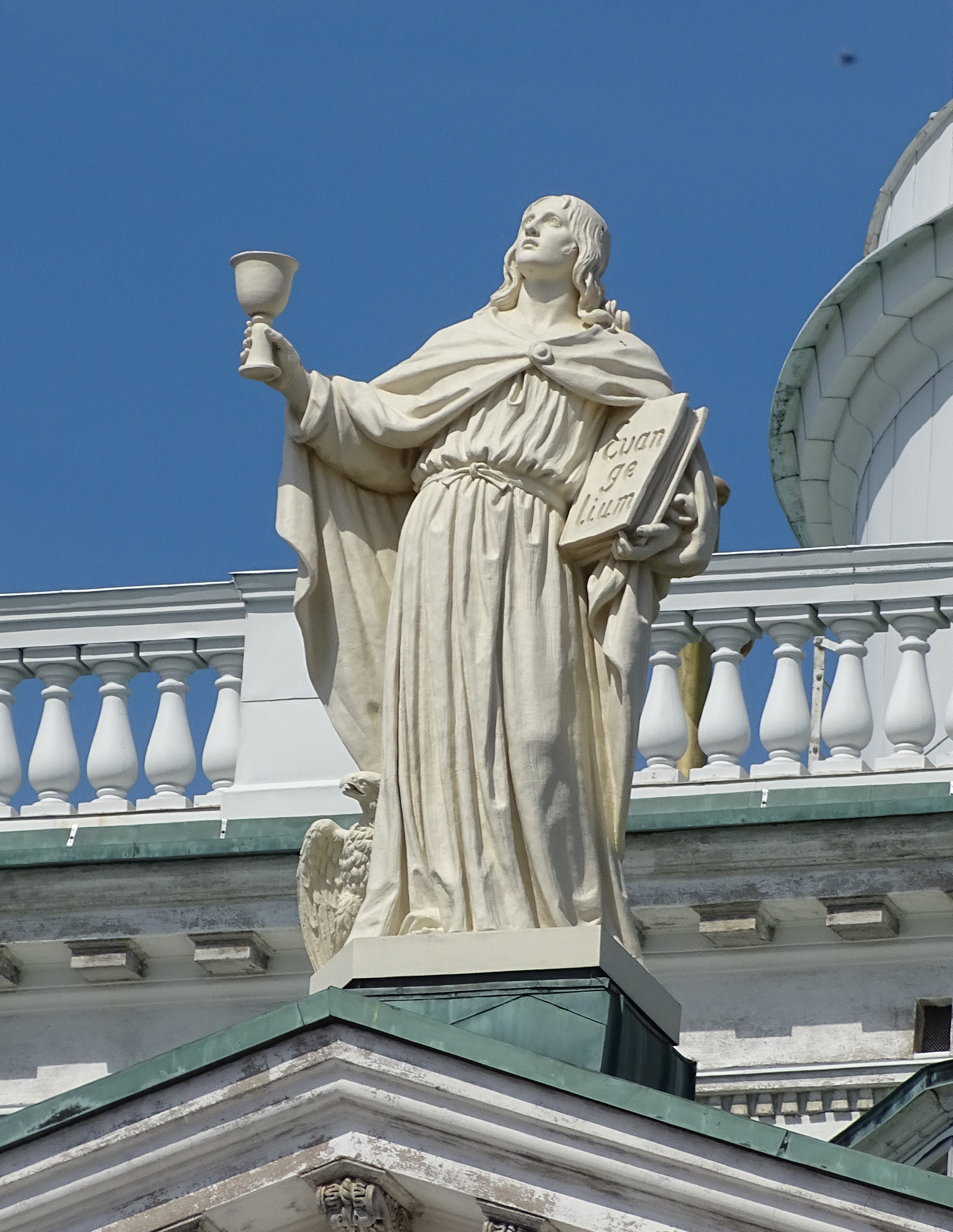
John the Apostle, carrying a cup

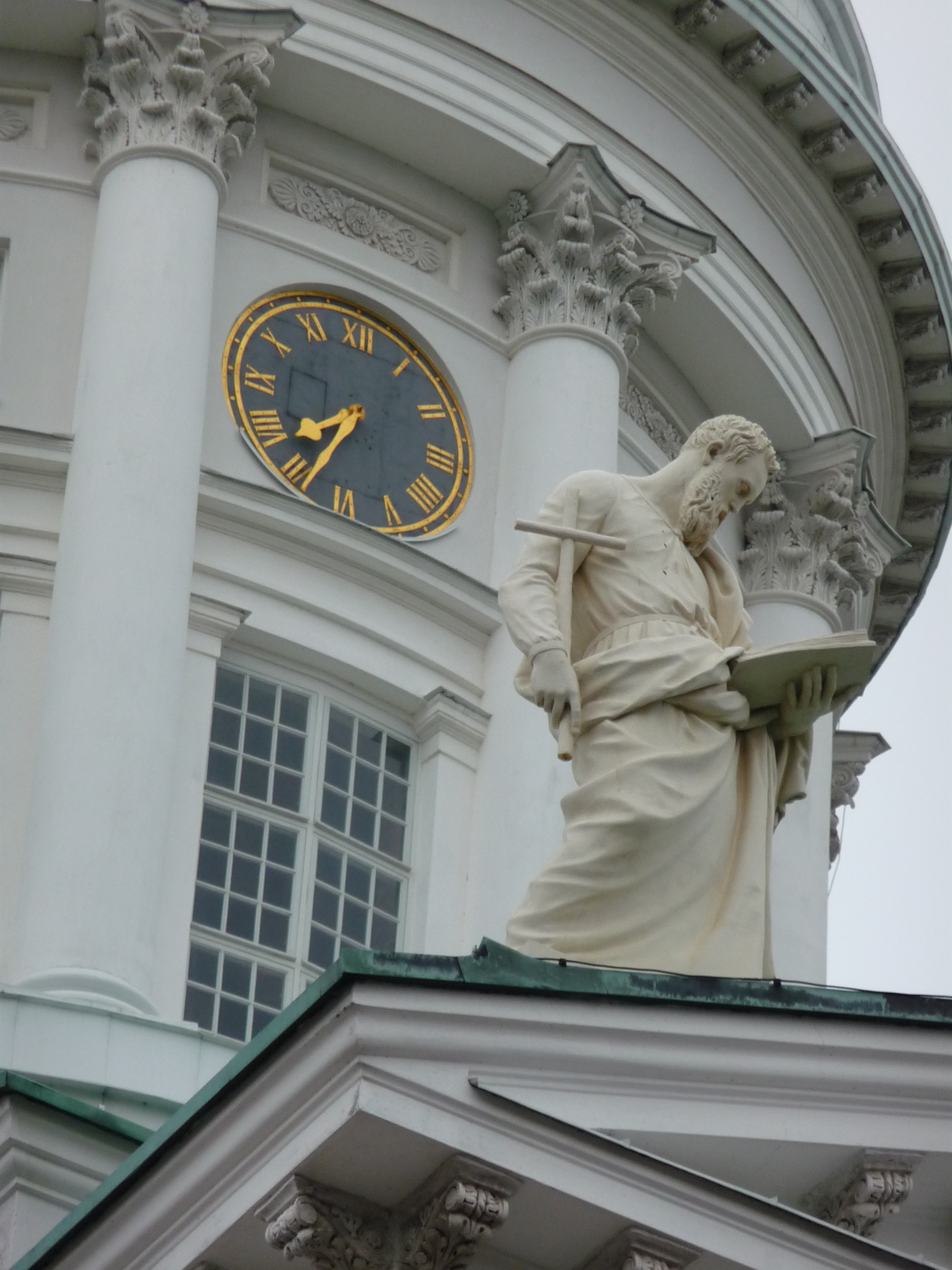
Philip the Apostle, carrying an open book

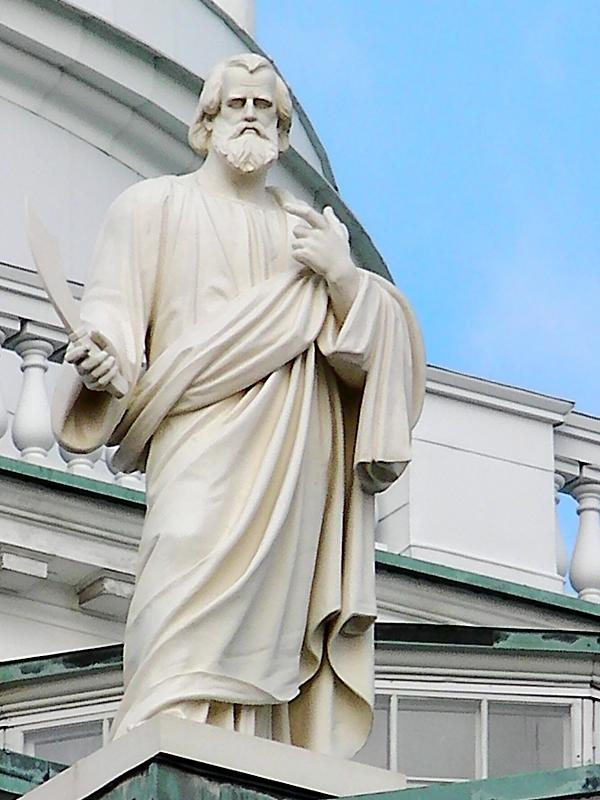
Bartholomew the Apostle, carrying a knife because he was skinned alive

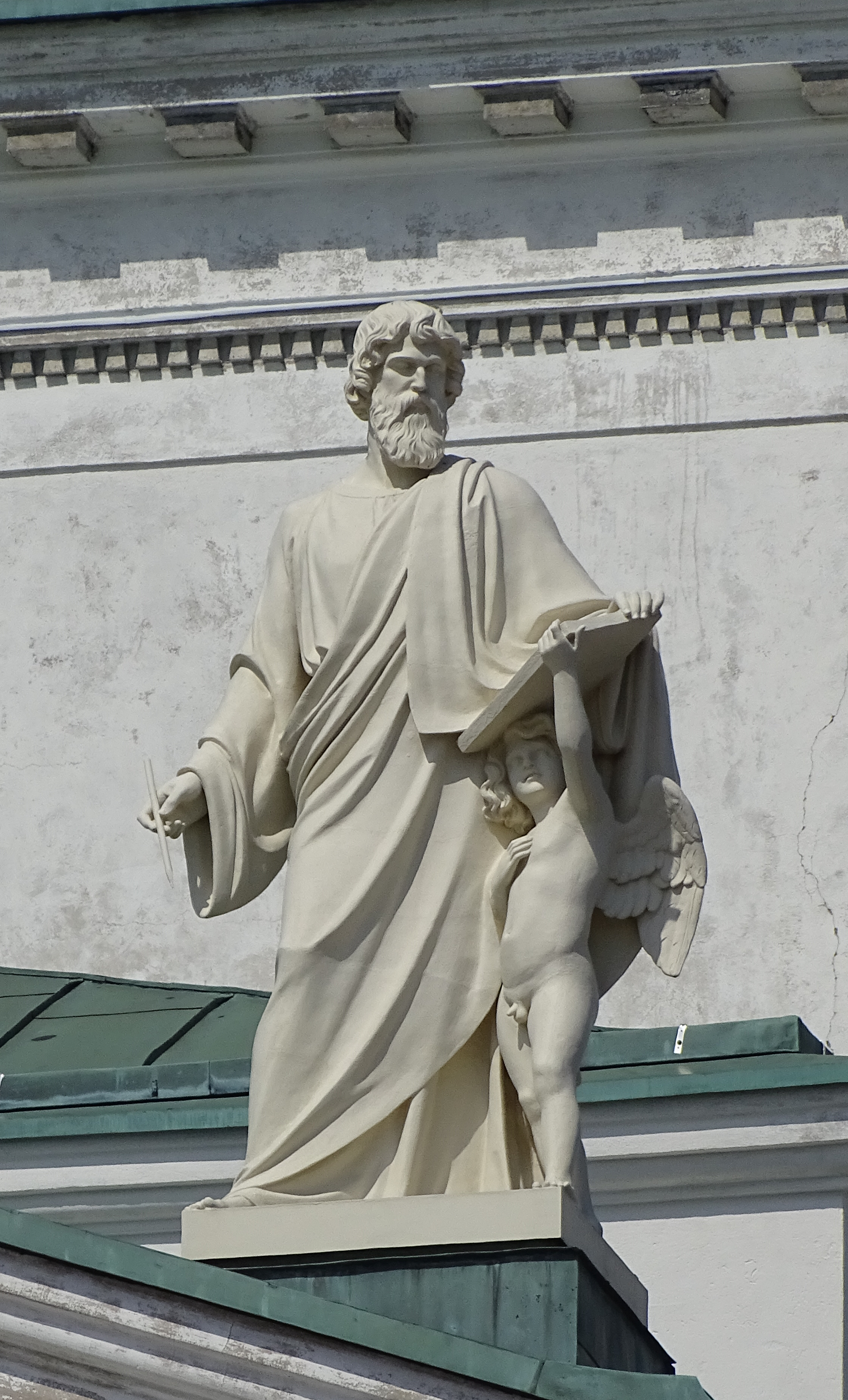
Matthew the Evangelist, carrying writing instruments

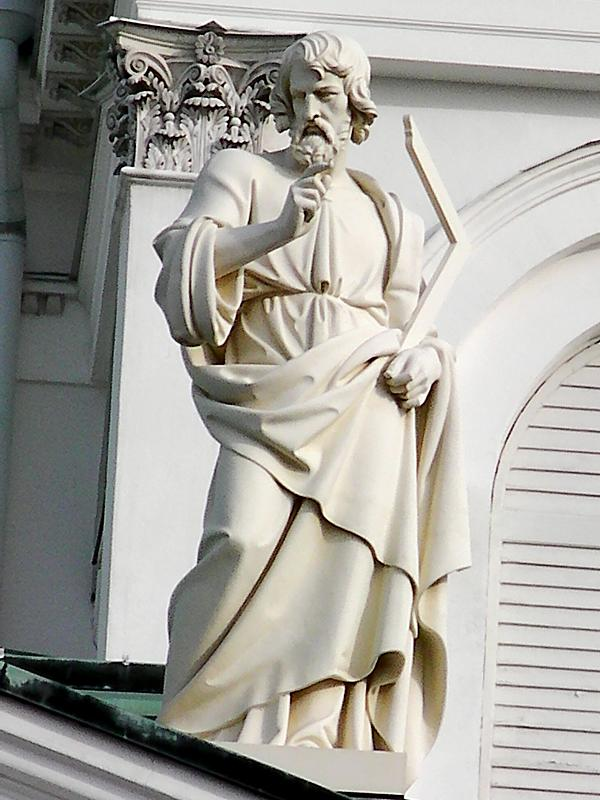
Thomas the Apostle, carrying a square

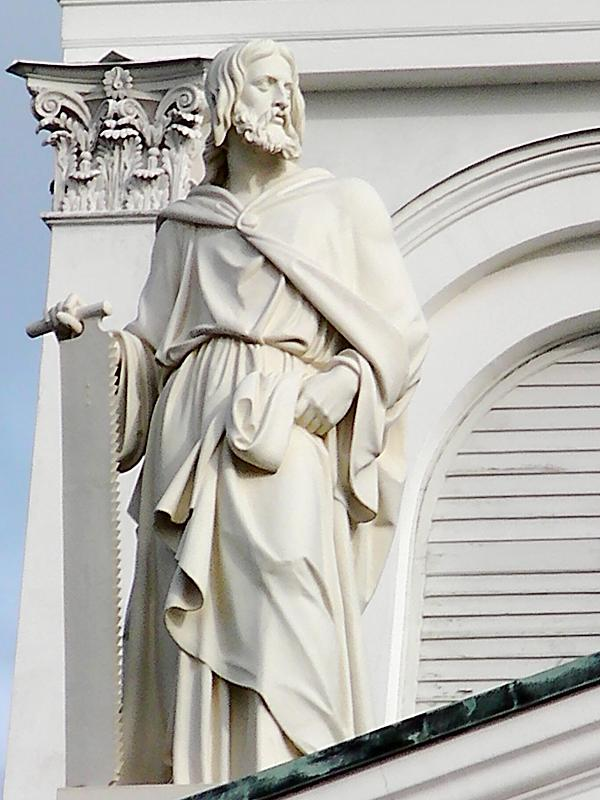
Simon the Zealot, carrying a saw

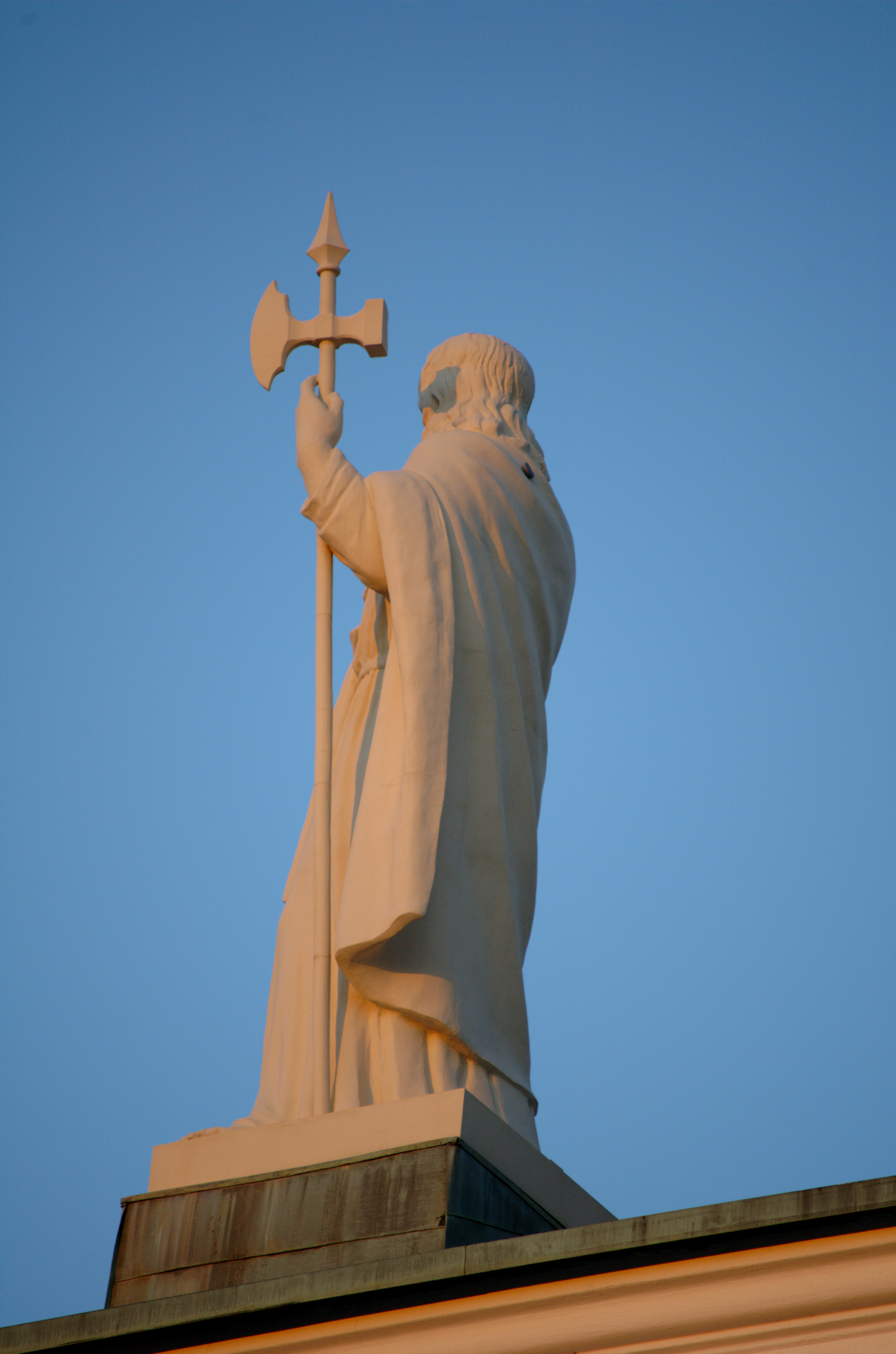
Saint Matthias, carrying an executioner's axe
There are also statues of Paul the Apostle, James the Great, James, son of Alphaeus and Andrew the Apostle.
Interior details
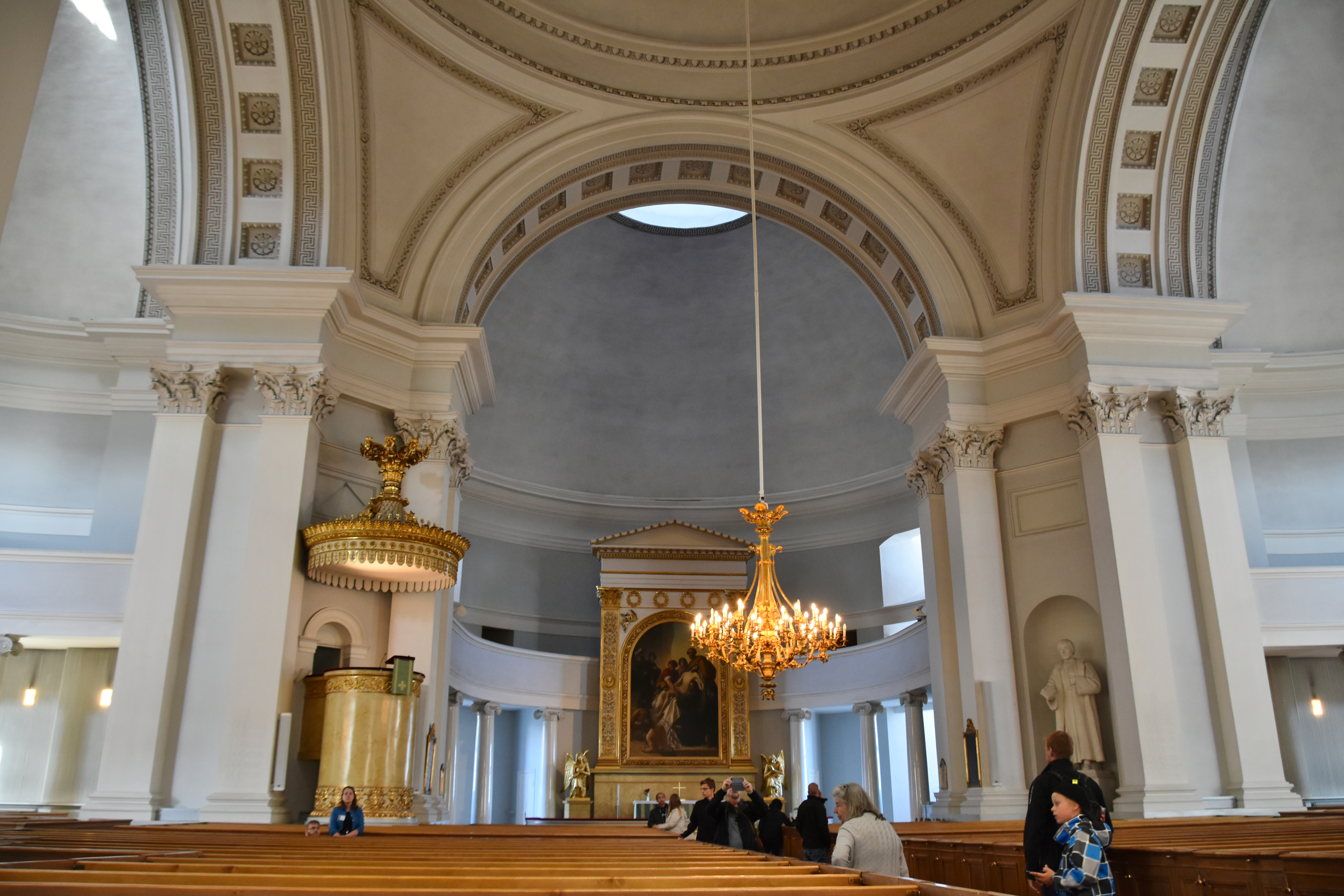
Interior, view towards the front

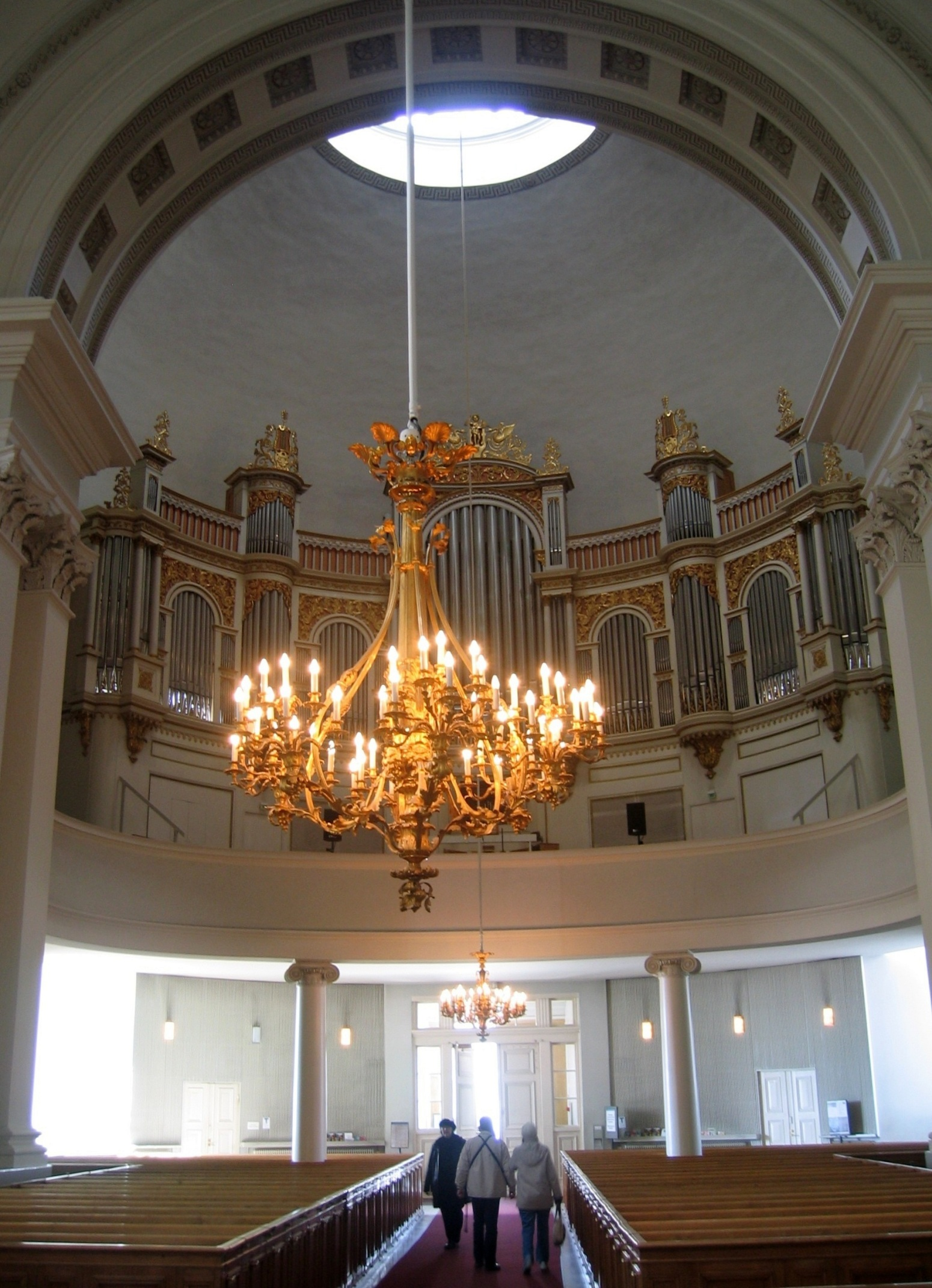
View towards the back

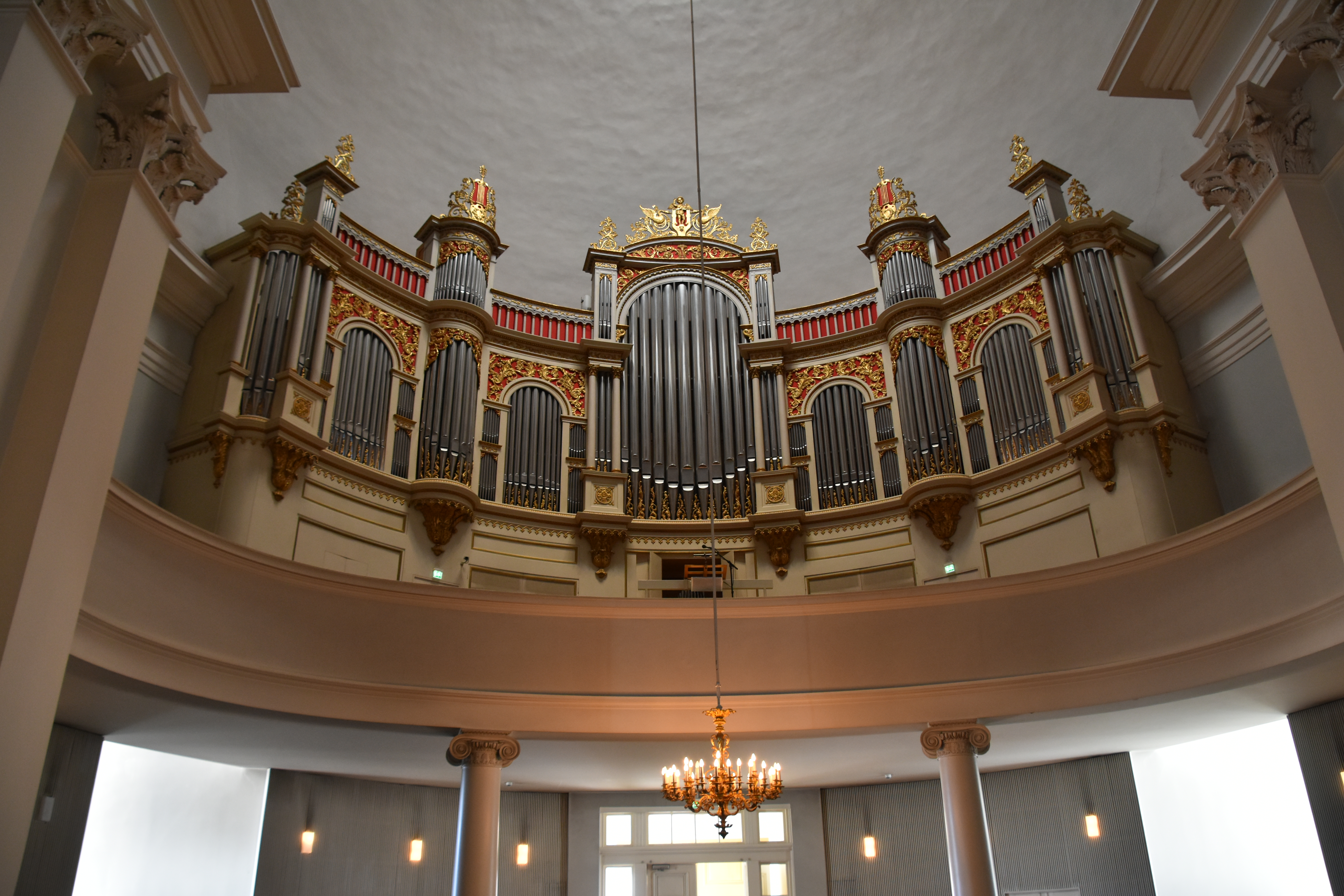
Organ

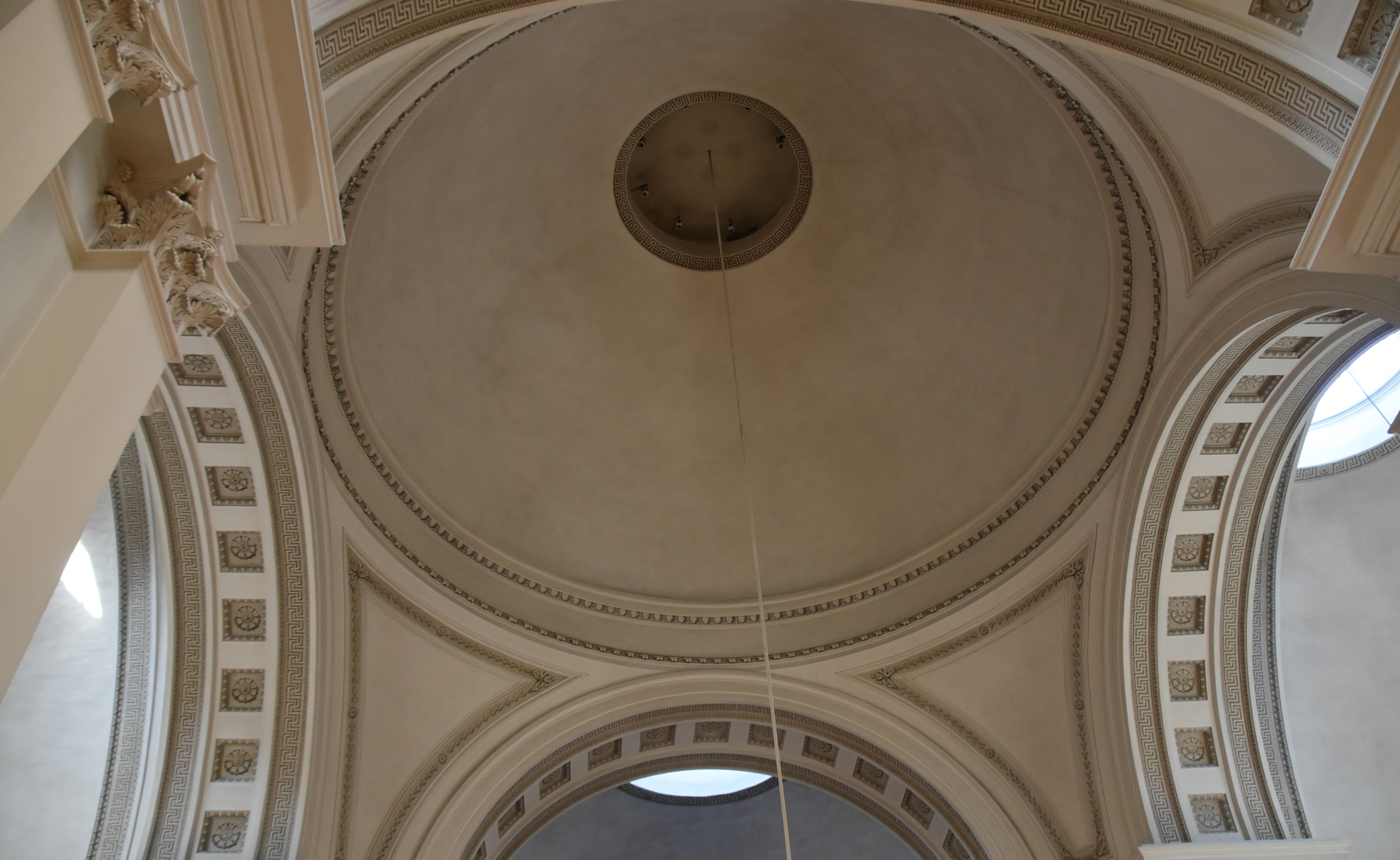
Plain dome

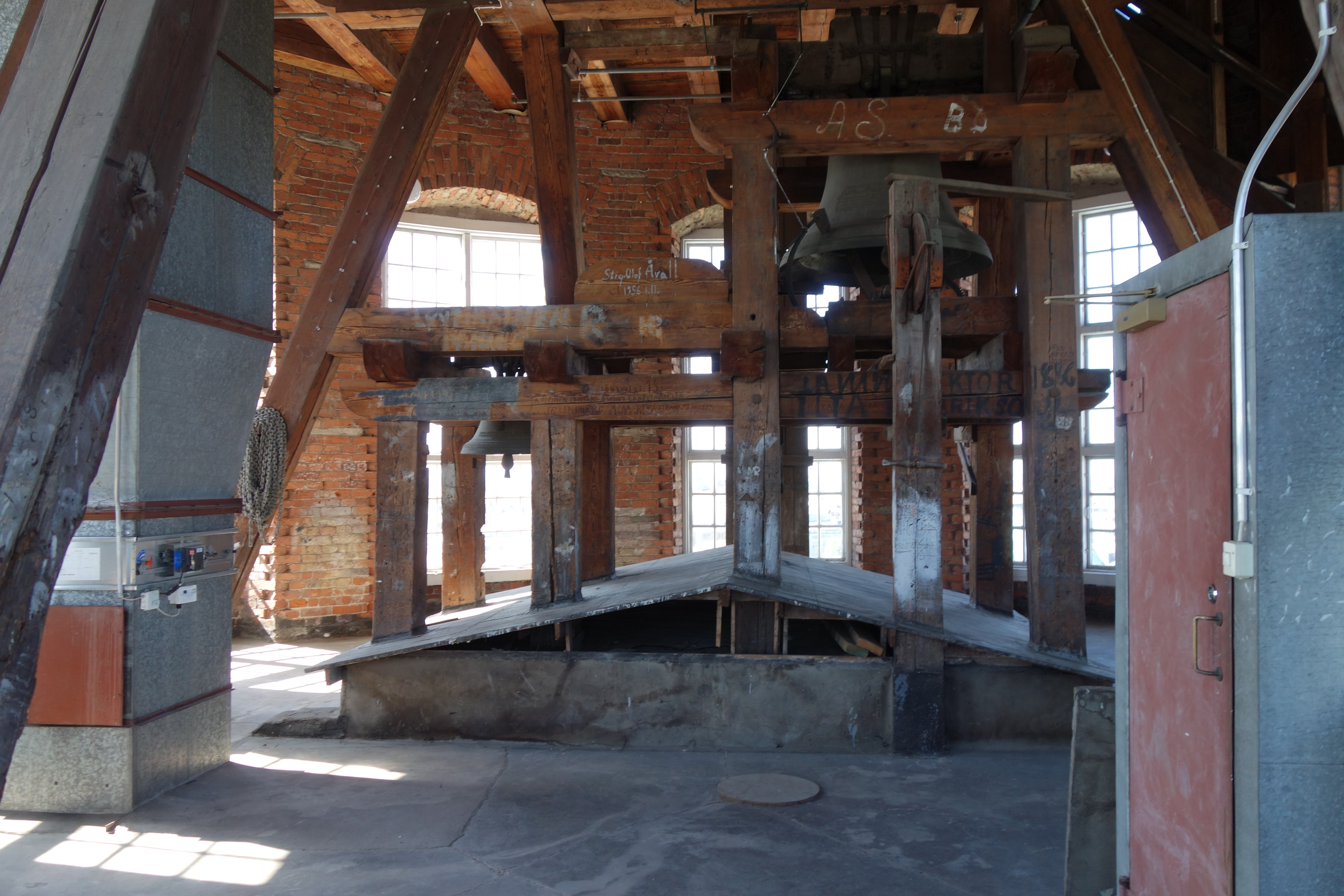
Dome inside

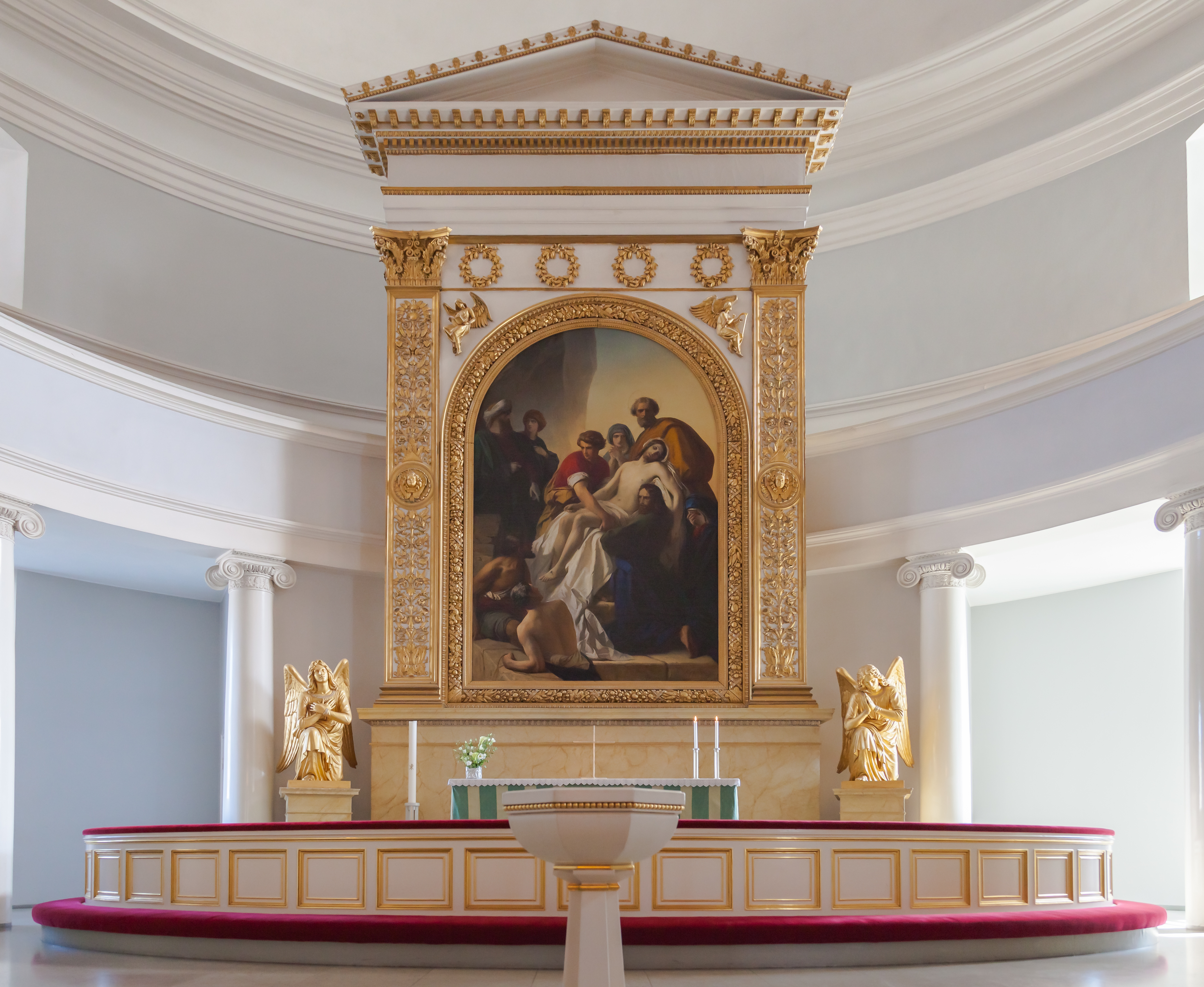
Altar, with Carl Timoleon von Neff's painting The Descent of Jesus from the Cross donated by Nicholas I

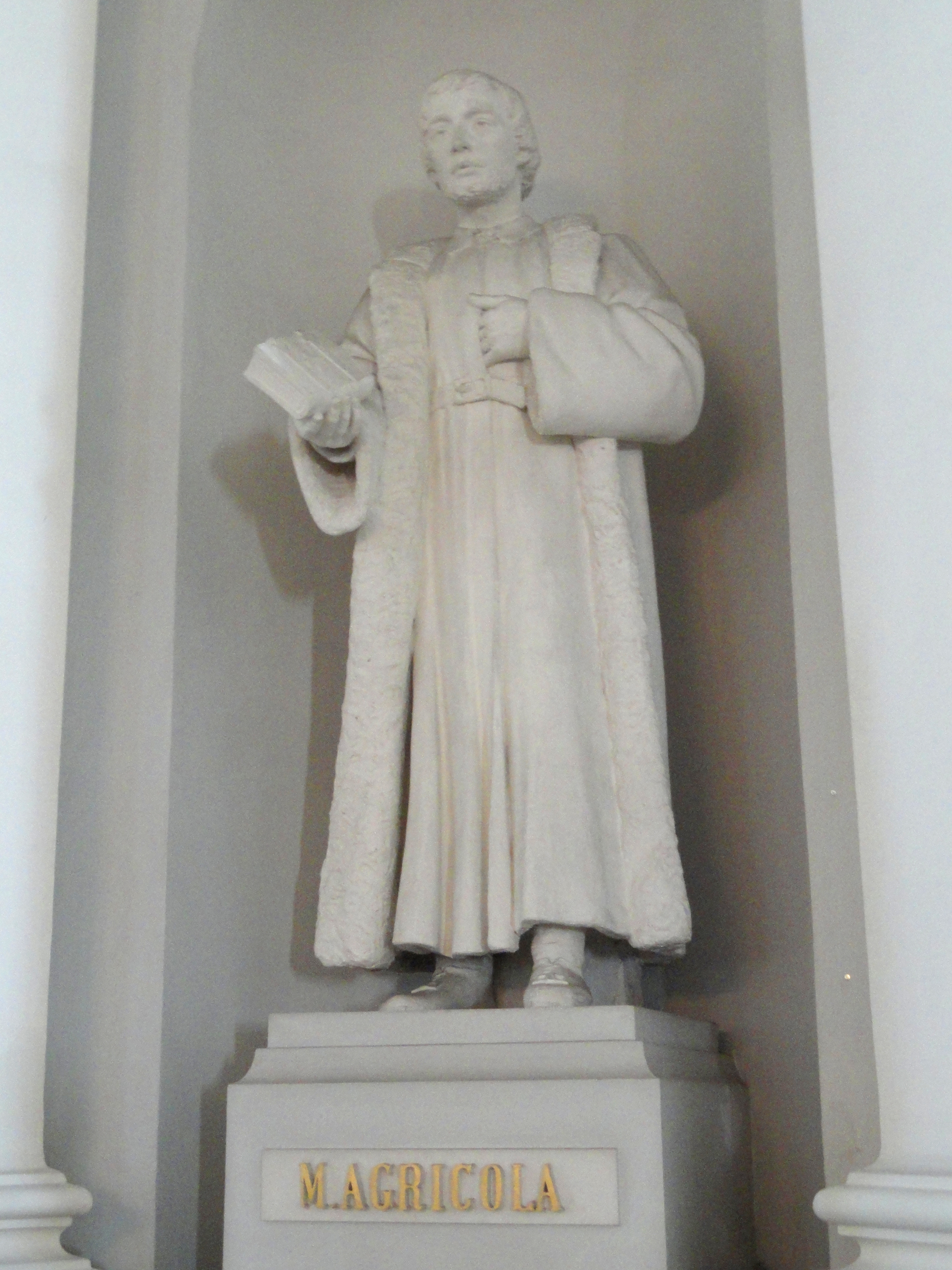
Mikael Agricola by Ville Vallgren, 1887

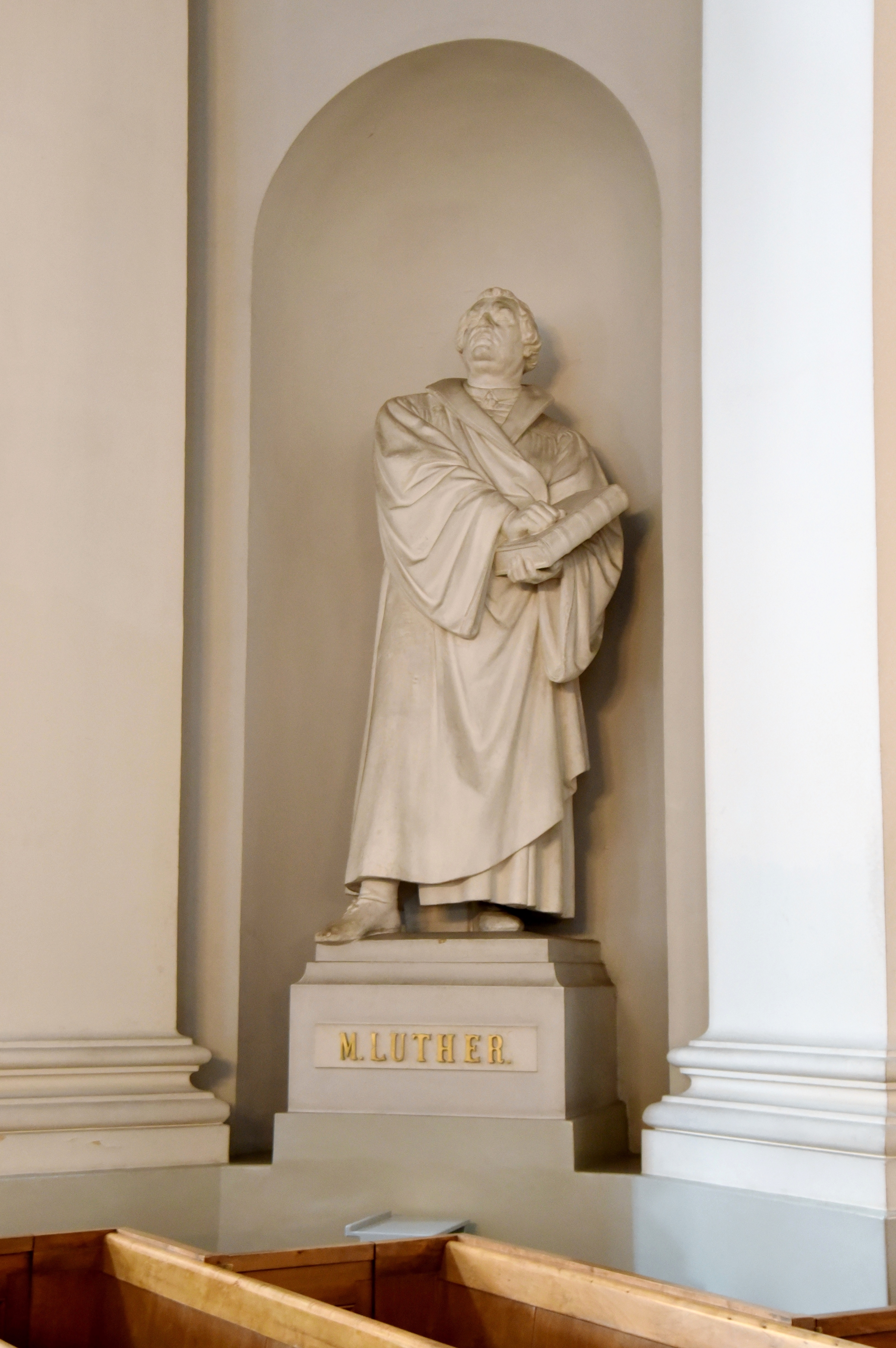
Martin Luther, copy of Ernst Rietschel's work in Worms brought in 1886

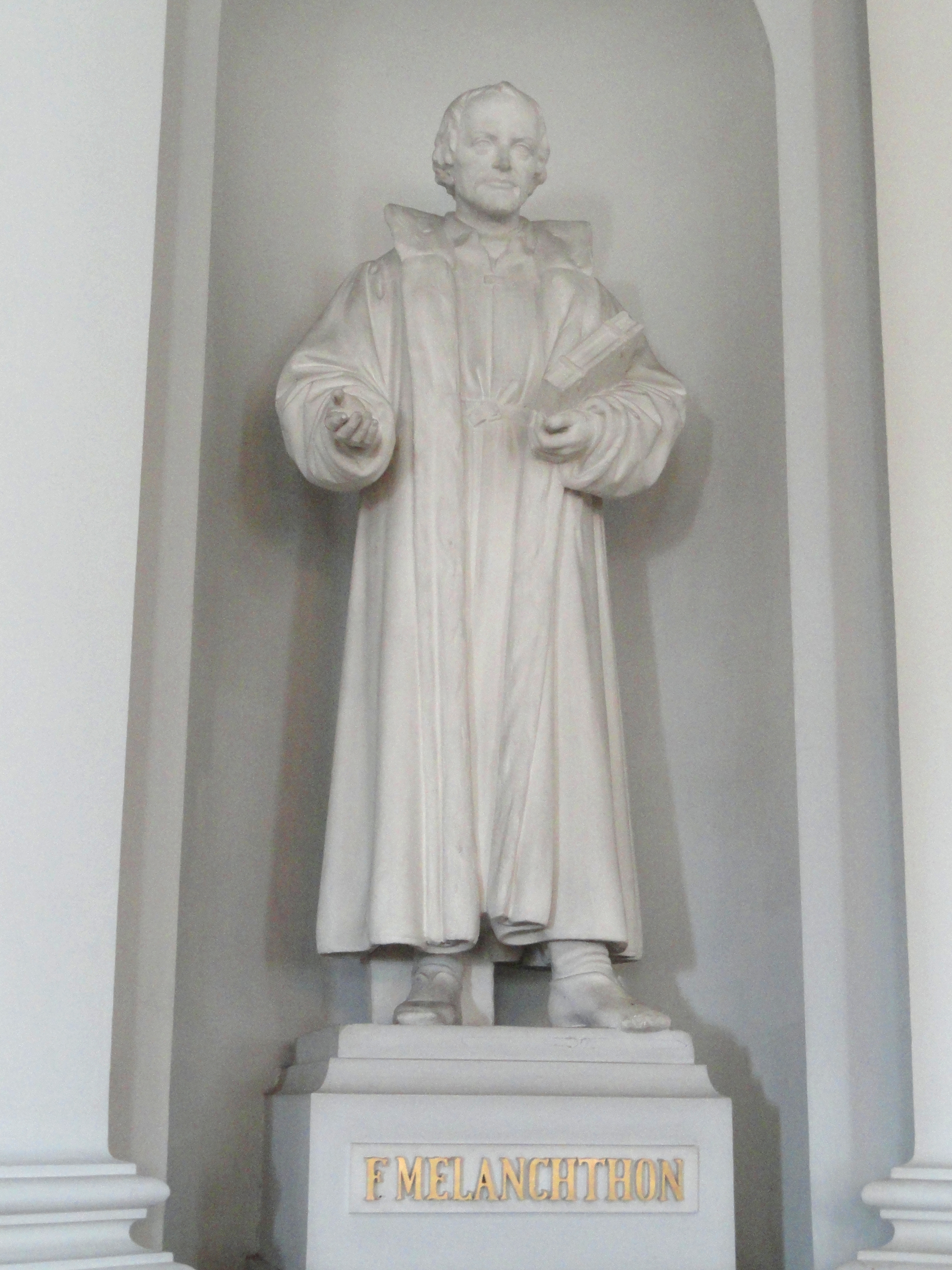
Melanchthon, similar copy of Rietchel

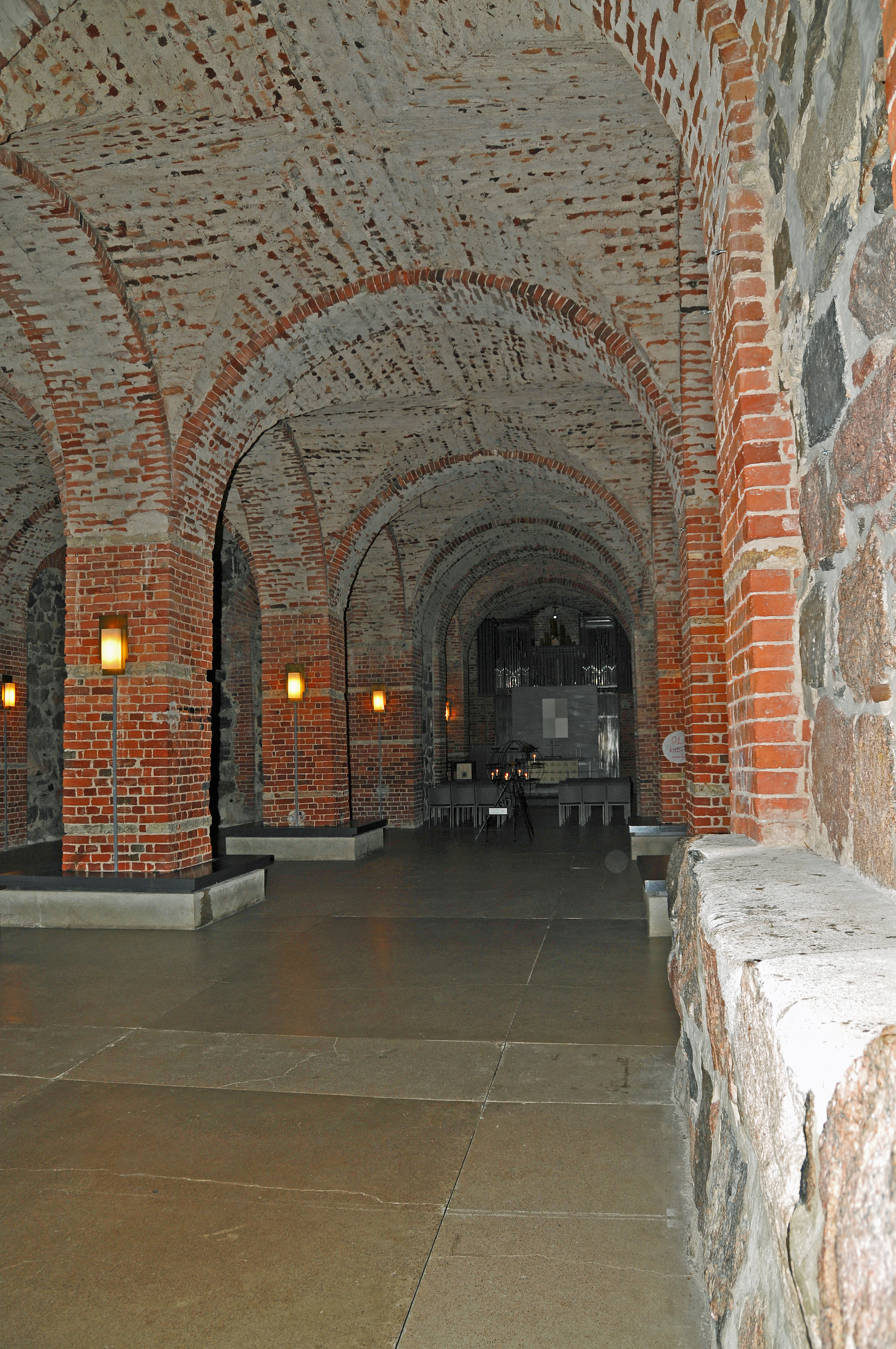
The crypt below

== See also ==
- St. John's Church
- Uspenski Cathedral
- St. Henry's Cathedral
- Holy Trinity Church, Helsinki
- Kamppi Chapel
- Temppeliaukio Church
- Kallio Church
- Saint Isaac's Cathedral (Saint Petersburg)
- Berlin Cathedral (Berlin)
