= Irja Askola =

Finnish Bishop

The Right Reverend Irja Askola
- Bishop Emeritus of Helsinki
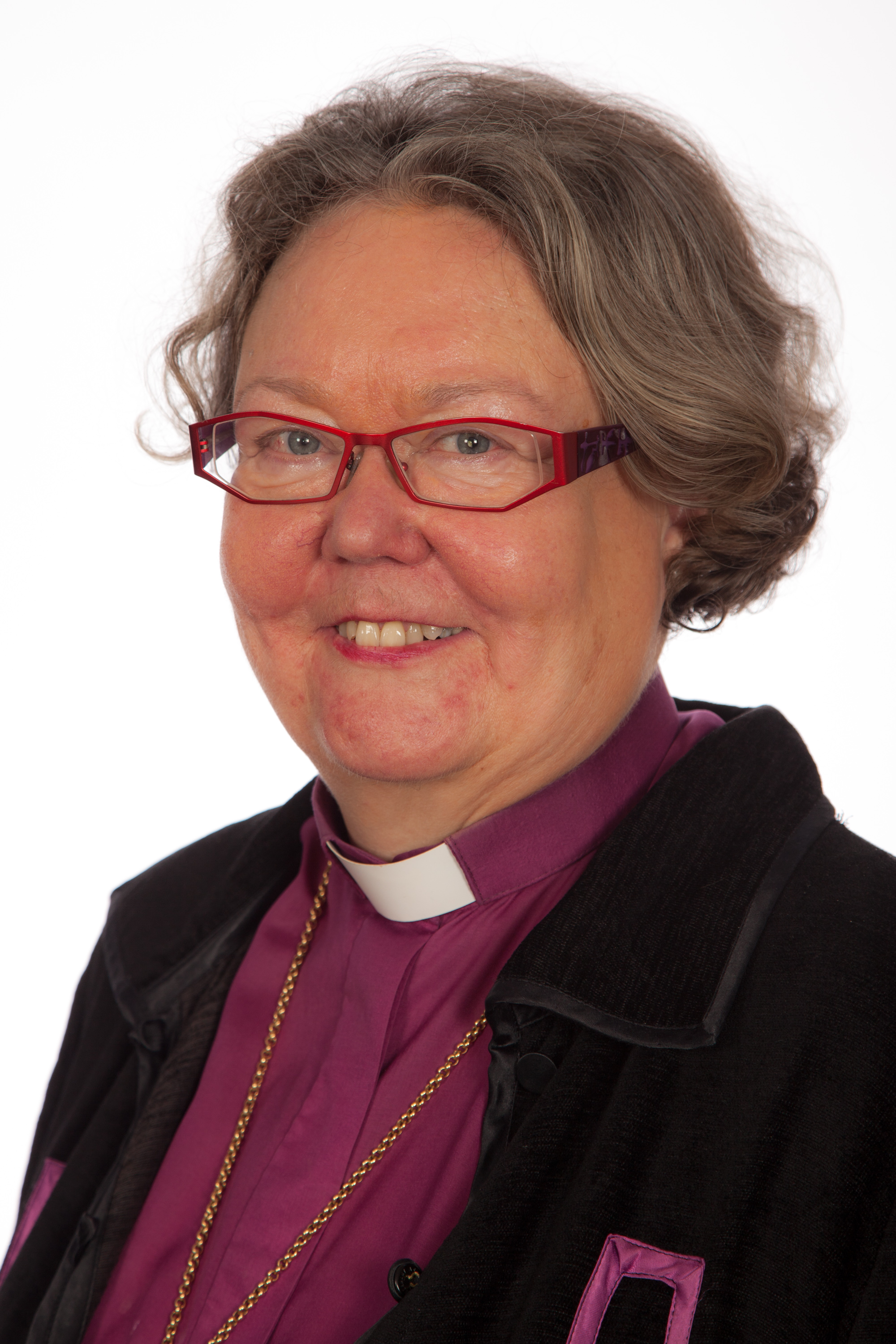
- Church: Evangelical Lutheran Church of Finland
- Elected: 2010
- Predecessor: Eero Huovinen
- Successor: Teemu Laajasalo

Orders
- Ordination: 1988
- Consecration: 12 September 2010 by Kari Mäkinen

Personal details
- Born: December 18, 1952 (age 73) Lappeenranta, Finland
- Education: University of Helsinki

Irja Kaarina Askola (born 18 December 1952 in Lappeenranta, Finland) is the former Bishop of Helsinki. She was the first female Finnish bishop in the Evangelical Lutheran Church of Finland.

Askola was the Bishop of Helsinki from 2010 to 2017.

== Early life and career ==
Askola first became involved with the Church as a child after the early death of her father. She started her theological studies at the University of Helsinki 1971 and continued them as an academic research assistant until 1981. In 1982 she was named the editor-in-chief of Vartija magazine together with Simo Knuuttila.

She graduated as Master of Theology in 1975, and was ordained as a priest in 1988.

Askola has worked as an executive secretary for the Conference of European Churches, based in Geneva, Switzerland from 1991 to 1999. She has also worked as a Special Advisor in Theological Affairs to the Bishop Mikko Heikka.

She was elected Bishop of Helsinki in June 2010 as successor to Eero Huovinen; she was chosen on the second round of the election with 591 votes.

== Episcopacy ==
Askola was installed on 12 September 2010 by the Archbishop of Turku, Kari Mäkinen. He was assisted by other bishops from Finland (Matti Repo and Mikko Heikka from the Diocese of Espoo); Norway (Olav Skjevesland); Denmark (Elisabeth Dons Christensen) and Namibia (Thomas Shivute). The Anglican Co-Consecrator was Edward Darling, the former Bishop of Limerick in the Church of Ireland.

Her consecration was attended by other women who are bishops — from Sweden, Germany and Denmark, and David Hamid, the Anglican Suffragan Bishop in Europe. Several Finnish public figures were also present, including President Tarja Halonen and Prime Minister Mari Kiviniemi.

In June 2013, Askola consecrated a same-sex couple for missionary work for the first time in Finland. Hundreds of conservative Finns resigned from the church in protest during the following days.

== Views ==
Askola is considered as a liberal; for example she supports same-sex marriage. She also said she wants to welcome more same-sex couples for Church blessings, but that no pastors would be compelled to do so In an interview given to YLE, Askola said she would practice "a dialogue with society", and that the Church must address such issues as current social inequalities and racial intolerance.

Religious titles
| Preceded by Eero Huovinen | Bishop of Helsinki; 2010 – 2017 | Succeeded by Teemu Laajasalo |
