= Samuel Lehtonen =

Samuel Lehtonen (3 February 1921, Helsinki – 20 August 2010) was the Lutheran bishop of the Diocese of Helsinki of the Evangelical Lutheran Church of Finland from 1982 to 1991.

Religious titles
Preceded by Aimo T. Nikolainen	Bishop of Helsinki; 1982 – 1991	Succeeded by Eero Huovinen
