= Eero Huovinen =

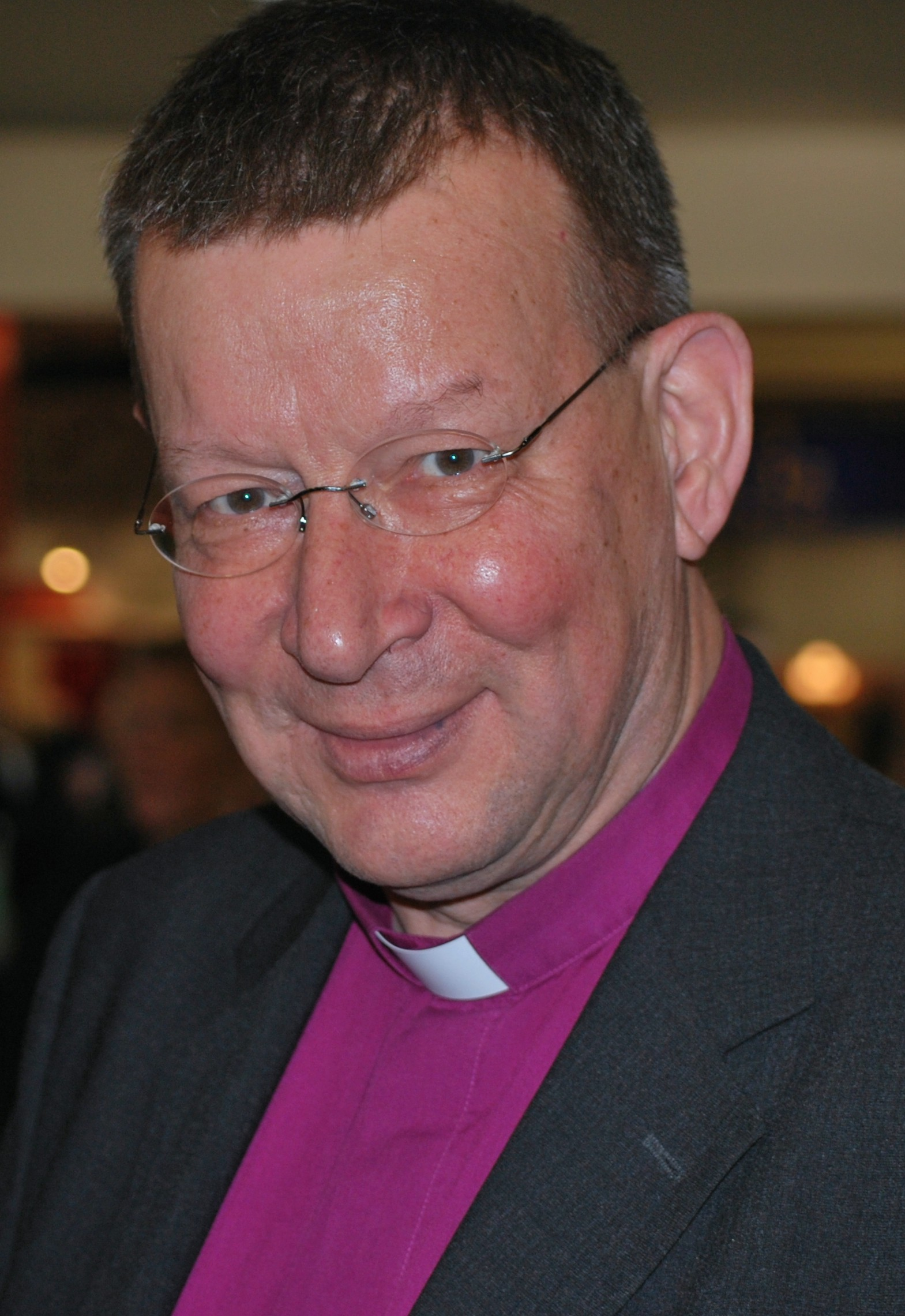
Eero Huovinen in October 2008.

Eero Huovinen (born 27 October 1944 in Helsinki) is the former Bishop of Helsinki in the Evangelical Lutheran Church of Finland.

== Biography ==
Eero Huovinen was born in Helsinki, the son of the Revd Dr Lauri Huovinen (1915–1994), Dean of the Cathedral of Turku. He studied at the University of Helsinki, graduating with a Master of Theology 1970; Licentiate of Theology 1976; and PhD in 1978.

Huovinen was ordained into the priesthood in 1970. Between 1970 and 1991 he held various positions at the University of Helsinki Faculty of Theology, including Professor of Dogmatics and Dean of the Faculty. He was appointed as Bishop of Helsinki on 1 March 1991, and retired in 2010.

Religious titles
Preceded by Samuel Lehtonen	Bishop of Helsinki; 1991 – 2010	Succeeded by Irja Askola
