= Diocese of Helsinki =

Diocese of Helsinki Helsingin hiippakunta
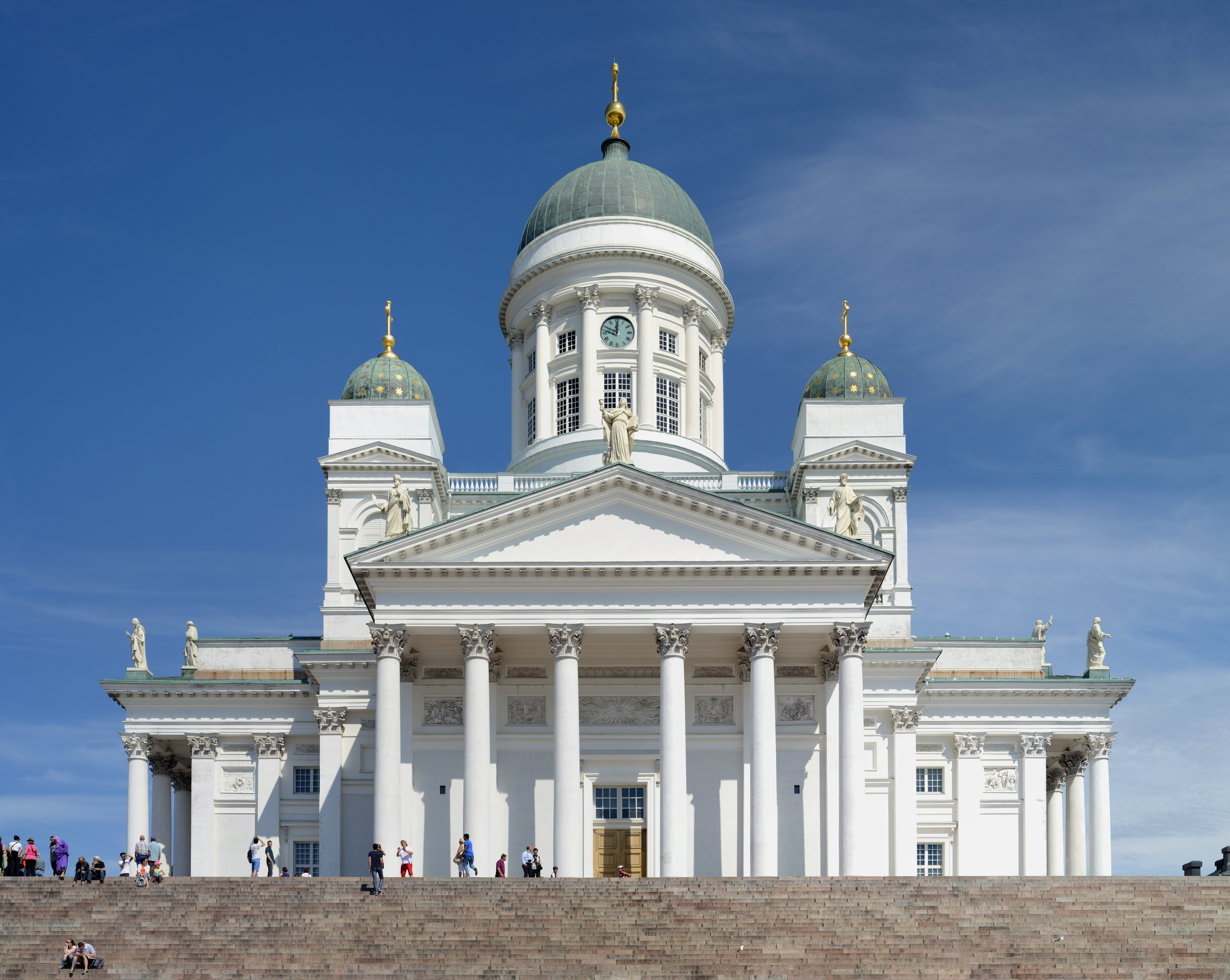

- Coat of arms

Location
- Country: Finland
- Ecclesiastical province: Turku & Finland
- Metropolitan: Archbishop of Turku & Finland

Information
- Denomination: Evangelical Lutheran Church of Finland
- Established: 1959
- Cathedral: Helsinki Cathedral

Current leadership
- Bishop: Teemu Laajasalo
- Metropolitan Archbishop: Tapio Luoma

Website
- helsinginhiippakunta.fi

The Diocese of Helsinki (Finnish: Helsingin hiippakunta; Swedish: Helsingfors stift) is a diocese of the Evangelical Lutheran Church of Finland, and the seat of the Bishop of Helsinki. Its cathedral is Helsinki Cathedral.

The diocese was established in 1959 by dividing the Diocese of Tampere. It covers only 1% of the country's territory, but contains 10% of its population. The diocese comprises 39 parishes. It was partitioned again in 2002, when the western part became the Diocese of Espoo. The current bishop of Helsinki is Teemu Laajasalo.

The diocese is unique among the Finnish dioceses in the sense that in some parish areas, the church members are in a minority. In the Kallio and Vallila districts, church membership among the residents is circa 49 per cent. Only in six of the 18 parishes of the diocese the membership share reaches over 60 per cent of the population.

== Bishops of Helsinki ==
- Martti Simojoki 1959–1964
- Aarre Lauha 1964–1972
- Aimo T. Nikolainen 1972–1982
- Samuel Lehtonen 1982–1991
- Eero Huovinen 1991–2010
- Irja Askola 2010–2017
- Teemu Laajasalo 2017–
