= Teemu Laajasalo =

Finnish clergyman (born 1974)

The Right Reverend Teemu Laajasalo
- Bishop of Helsinki
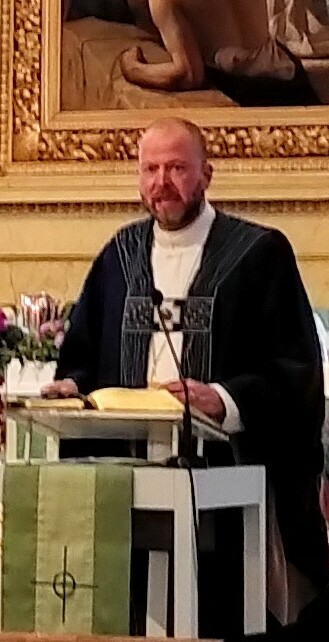
- Laajasalo in 2021
- Church: Evangelical Lutheran Church of Finland
- Elected: 2017
- Installed: 12 November 2017
- Predecessor: Irja Askola

Orders
- Ordination: 1997
- Consecration: 12 November 2017 by Kari Mäkinen

Personal details
- Born: 10 July 1974 (age 51) Helsinki, Finland

Teemu Olavi Laajasalo (born 10 July 1974) is a Finnish clergyman. He was born in Helsinki and obtained the qualification of doctor in education. He is currently the Lutheran Bishop of Helsinki. He was elected on 16 August 2017. He has previously served as the vicar of the parish of Kallio.

Helsinki police suspected Laajasalo of accounting fraud. In 2019, the Helsinki District Court imposed a 20-day fine on Laajasalo for aggravated negligence accounting offences.

Religious titles
Preceded by Irja Askola	Bishop of Helsinki; 2017 –	Incumbent
