= Johan Wingård =

Swedish bishop (1738–1818)

The Right Reverend Johan Wingård KNO, RCXIII:sO
- Bishop of Gothenburg
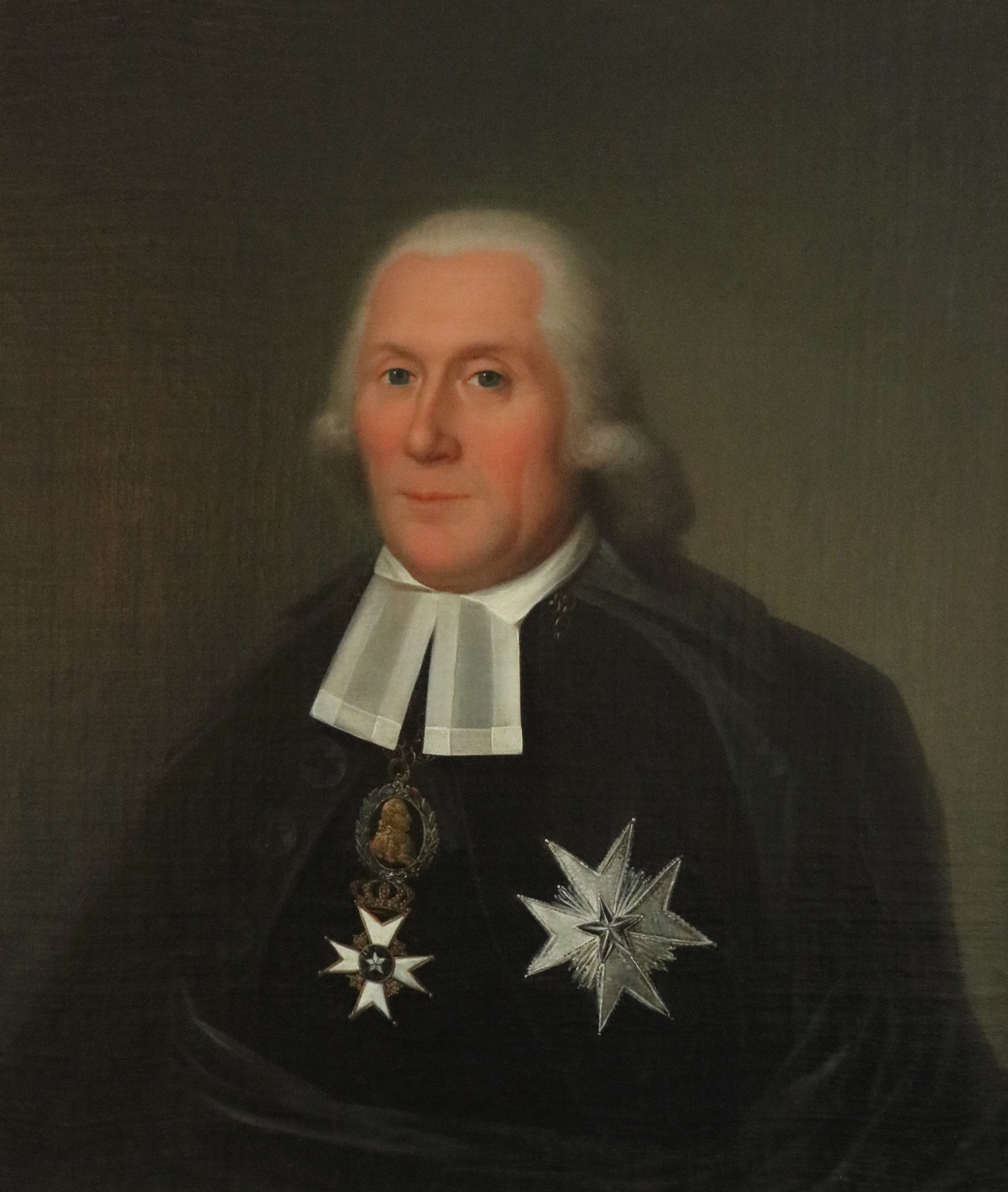
- Portrait in oil by Johan Ahlberg
- Church: Church of Sweden
- Diocese: Gothenburg
- In office: 1780–1818
- Predecessor: Erik Lamberg
- Successor: Carl Fredrik af Wingård

Personal details
- Born: 19 April 1738 Bohuslän, Sweden
- Died: 12 January 1818 (aged 79) Gothenburg, Sweden
- Spouse: Fredrika af Darelli
- Children: Johan Didrik af Wingård, Johanna Helena Wrangel, Carl Fredrik af Wingård
- Education: Uppsala University
- Motto: Omnibus non placere

Johan Wingård (19 April 1738 – 12 January 1818) was a Swedish Lutheran bishop of the Diocese of Gothenburg of the Church of Sweden, as well as first holder of chair no. 6 of the Swedish Academy. He also served as member of the Riksdag of the Estates.

== Biography ==
Johan Wingård was born in 1738 in Bohuslän, Sweden, to Didrik Hansson Wingård and Inger Helena (née Quilldahl). His family included several clergy; his 4th great-grandfather was the Norwegian-Swedish Protestant reformer Gude Axelsen Giedde, and his nephew was the poet Johan Börjesson. He married Fredrika (née af Darelli), daughter of Johan Anders af Darelli. Their issue included Johan Didrik af Wingård, Johanna Helena (married Wrangel af Sauss) and Carl Fredrik af Wingård, the latter the future Archbishop of the Church of Sweden.

Wingård studied at Hvitfeldtska gymnasiet and Uppsala University, from where he received a Doctor of Theology in 1779. He was ordained priest in Saint James's Church in Stockholm in 1766, appointed vicar in 1775, and bishop of the Diocese of Gothenburg in 1780. He served at the royal court of Queen Louisa Ulrika, whose funeral he also held in the Riddarholm Church.

Bishop Johan Wingård attended as member of the Estate of the Clergy at the Riksdag of the Estates in 1778, 1786, 1789, 1792 and 1800.

He was the first holder of chair No. 6 of the Swedish Academy, a member of the Swedish Order of Freemasons, and a fellow of the Royal Swedish Pro Patria Society.

== Distinctions ==
- Sweden: Commander of the Order of the Polar Star (1789; Knight 1784)
- Sweden: Knight of the Order of Charles XIII
- Sweden: Chair no. 6 of the Swedish Academy

Cultural offices
| Preceded by First holder | Swedish Academy, Seat No. 6; 2013– | Succeeded by Adolf Göran Mörner |
