= Johan Börjesson =

Swedish prelate, poet, and dramatist

The Reverend Johan Börjesson RDDO, LVVS
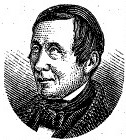
- Johan Börjesson in Svenskt biografiskt handlexikon.
- Born: 30 August 1790; Tanum, Sweden
- Died: 6 May 1866 (aged 75)
- Education: Uppsala University
- Occupations: Prelate, poet, and dramatist
- Spouse: Fredrika Gustava Fock
- Children: 2, including Agnes Börjesson
- Relatives: Bishop Johan Wingård (uncle); Archbishop Carl Fredrik af Wingård (cousin); Freiherr sv:Berndt Wilhelm Fock (father-in-law)
- Writing career
- Language: Swedish
- Years active: 1814–1866
- Movements: Phosphorism; Romanticism

Johan Börjesson (30 August 1790 – 6 May 1866) was a Swedish prelate, poet, and dramatist, associated with the Swedish phosphorist and romanticist movements. He was holder of the chair 3 of the Swedish Academy.

== Biography ==
Johan Börjesson was born in Tanum, Bohuslän, in 1790 to Börje Hansson and Agneta Wingård. His uncle was Bishop Johan Wingård, his cousin Archbishop Carl Fredrik af Wingård. He enrolled at Uppsala University in 1808, graduated in 1815, and was ordinated priest in the Church of Sweden in 1816. While in Uppsala, Börjesson was admitted to the romanticist society Aurora, where he initiated his poetic endeavours, although he never quite embraced the movement's ideals.

Johan Börjesson married Fredrika Gustava Fock, the daughter of Freiherr sv:Berndt Wilhelm Fock, in 1823. They had two daughters, of which one survived into adulthood, the artist Agnes Börjesson, who became one of the four first women admitted to the Royal Swedish Academy of Fine Arts.

Later in life, in the early 1860s, his manse was visited by the British novelist Horace Marryat who subsequently published a travelogue, One year in Sweden (published 1862; Swedish translation 1863), based in his impressions and findings while staying with the family.

After a long time on the countryside, towards the last few months of his life he returned to Uppsala.

== Presbytariate ==
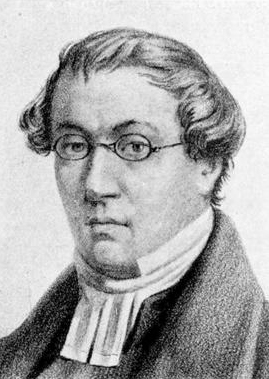
Johan Börjesson as prelate in Uppsala (circa 1820).

Following his ordination into priesthood, he was designated adjunct in Uppsala parish, Archdiocese of Uppsala, and in 1820 its attorney. His preaching gained reputation, and in 1821 he was admitted as preacher at the Royal Court of Sweden. He was appointed vicar in three parishes in the Archdiocese of Uppsala in 1828, whereafter elevated to provost in 1840. At the time of the Coronation of King Oscar I of Sweden in 1844, he was promoted to Doctor of Theology.

== Literature ==
Already in 1814 he won the Grand Prize of the Royal Society of Sciences and Letters in Gothenburg, its highest prize, for the work Aphrodite. The same year, he was admitted to the Poetisk Kalender of Per Daniel Amadeus Atterbom.

Around the time of his initiation to the presbytariate, he published Skapelsen i sånger (1820), which however was not well met by the critics.

In 1846 he published the historic play Erik den fjortonde, reportedly the first modern historical play in Sweden, which was set up on scene with pleased reviews. After this followed plays like Erik den fjortondes son (1847), Solen sjunker, Gustaf I:s sista dagar (1856), Ur Karl XII:s ungdom (1858), Brödraskulden, and Erik den Fjortonde, senare avdelningen (1861). He also resumed his lyrical writings; in 1849 Kärlek och poesi was anonymously published, in 1854 Blommor och tårar på en dotters grav, the latter after the death of his daughter Amanda. Börjesson had just finished another play, En sammansvärjning i Rom, including his very last poem Afsked till publiken och kritiken, when he died in the spring of 1866.

== Bibliography ==
- Erik den fjortonde. Stockholm: Bagge. 1846–1861. SELIBR 1592016.
- Erik XIV:s son : sorgespel i fem akter. Stockholm: Rylander. 1847. SELIBR 1591902.
- Kärlek och poesi. Stockholm: Bagge. 1849. SELIBR 1591903.
- Blommor och tdatear på en dotters graf. Stockholm: Bonnier. 1854. SELIBR 671796.
- Solen sjunker, Gustaf I:stes sista dagar : historisk tragedi i fyra akter. Stockholm: Bonnier. 1856. SELIBR 1592025.
- Ur Carl XIIs ungdom : ett äfventyr i fem akter. Stockholm: Bonnier. 1858. SELIBR 1591907.
- Inträdes-tal hållet i Svenska akademien [över C.G. von Brinkman] den 19 mars 1861. Stockholm. 1861. SELIBR 2985990.
- En statshvälfning i Rom : sorgespel i fyra akter. Upsala: Schultz. 1866. SELIBR 1579128.
- Solen sjunker : historisk tragedi i 4 akter. Svenska teatern, 99-1250025-3; 205. Stockholm: Bonnier. 1873. SELIBR 1585508.
- Flera bidrag i Poetisk kalender dateen 1815–1819 i fulltext på Litteraturbanken.

=== Writings in selection ===
- Johan Börjessons valda skrifter med författarens biografi af N. Arfvidsson; utgifne af L. Dietrichson. Stockholm: Bonnier. 1873–1874. SELIBR 8208293.
  - 1, Dramatiska dikter. 1873. SELIBR 8208294.
  - 2, Lyriska dikter. 1874. SELIBR 8208295.

== Distinctions ==
- Chair 3 of the Swedish Academy (1859)
- Grand Prize of the Swedish Academy (1856)
- Knight of the Order of the Dannebrog (1856)
- Member of the Royal Society of Sciences and Letters in Gothenburg (1823)
- Grand Prize of the Royal Society of Sciences and Letters in Gothenburg (1814)

Cultural offices
Preceded by Albrecht Elof Ihre	Swedish Academy, Chair No 3; 1859–1866	Succeeded by Hans Magnus Melin
