= Jeanette Möller =

Swedish artist (1825–1872)

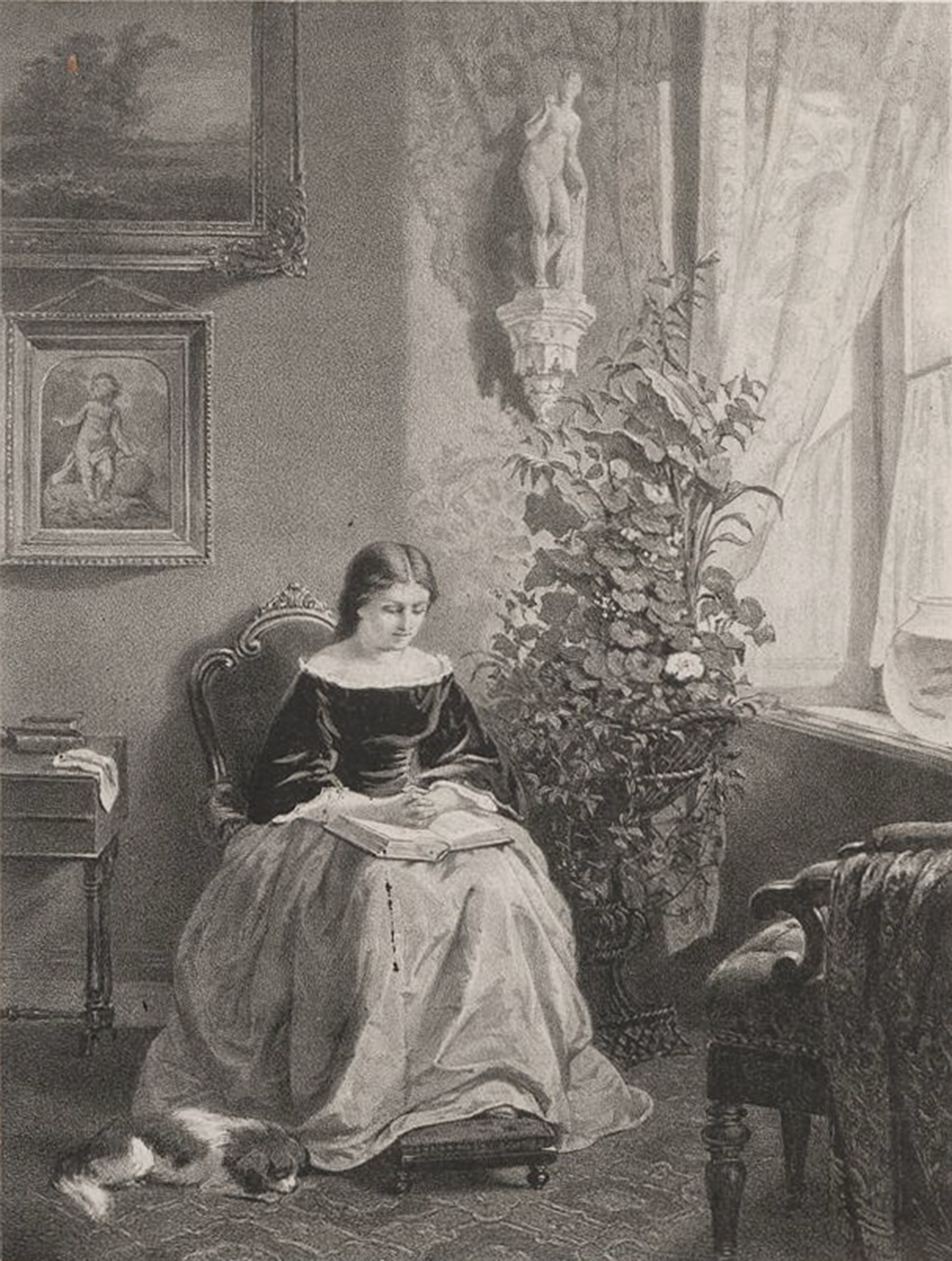
- Born: Jeanette Holmlund; 5 January 1825; Stockholm, Sweden
- Died: 25 March 1872 (aged 47); Düsseldorf, Germany
- Known for: Painting
- Spouse: Niels Bjørnson Møller (m. 1860)

Jeanette Möller, née Holmlund (5 January 1825 – 25 March 1872) was a Swedish painter.

== Biography ==
Möller was born in Stockholm, Sweden. She was the daughter of the merchant Nils Holmlund and Johanna Helena Torsslow. In 1849, she became one of four females accepted as students at the Royal Swedish Academy of Arts in Stockholm: the other three being Lea Ahlborn, Agnes Börjesson and Amalia Lindegren. Between 1851 and 1854, she was a student of the genre painter Vautier in Paris. On her return to Stockholm, she founded and managed an art studio for female students. From 1858, she spent her time divided between Sweden and Düsseldorf from Germany.

Jeanette Möller has been characterized as a genre painter. Her more known works include Shakespeare i sin studerkammare (Shakespeare in his chamber), Läsande munk (Reading monk), Sömmerska insomnad vid sitt arbete (Seamstress asleep at her work), Meditation and Flicka som matar höns (Girl feeding hens). Jeanette Möller was an agré of the Royal Swedish Academy of Arts from 1861.

== Personal life ==
In 1858 Jeanette Möller moved to Düsseldorf, Germany. In 1860, she married Norwegian painter Niels Bjørnson Møller (1827–1887). Their son Björn Möller was born during 1862. Their daughter Johanna Björnson Möller (born 1870) was married to economist Gustav Cassel (1866–1945). Jeanette Möller died during 1872 and Niels Möller died during 1887, both in Düsseldorf.

== Other sources ==
- Möller, Jeanette i Herman Hofberg, Svenskt biografiskt handlexikon (andra upplagan, 1906)
- Österberg, Carin med flera: Svenska kvinnor - föregångare, nyskapare. Lund: Signum 1990, ISBN 91-87896-03-6
- Möller, Jeannette i Nordisk familjebok (andra upplagan, 1913)
