= Johan Didrik af Wingård =

Swedish statesman and minister (1778-1854)

The High Well Born Johan Didrik af Wingård
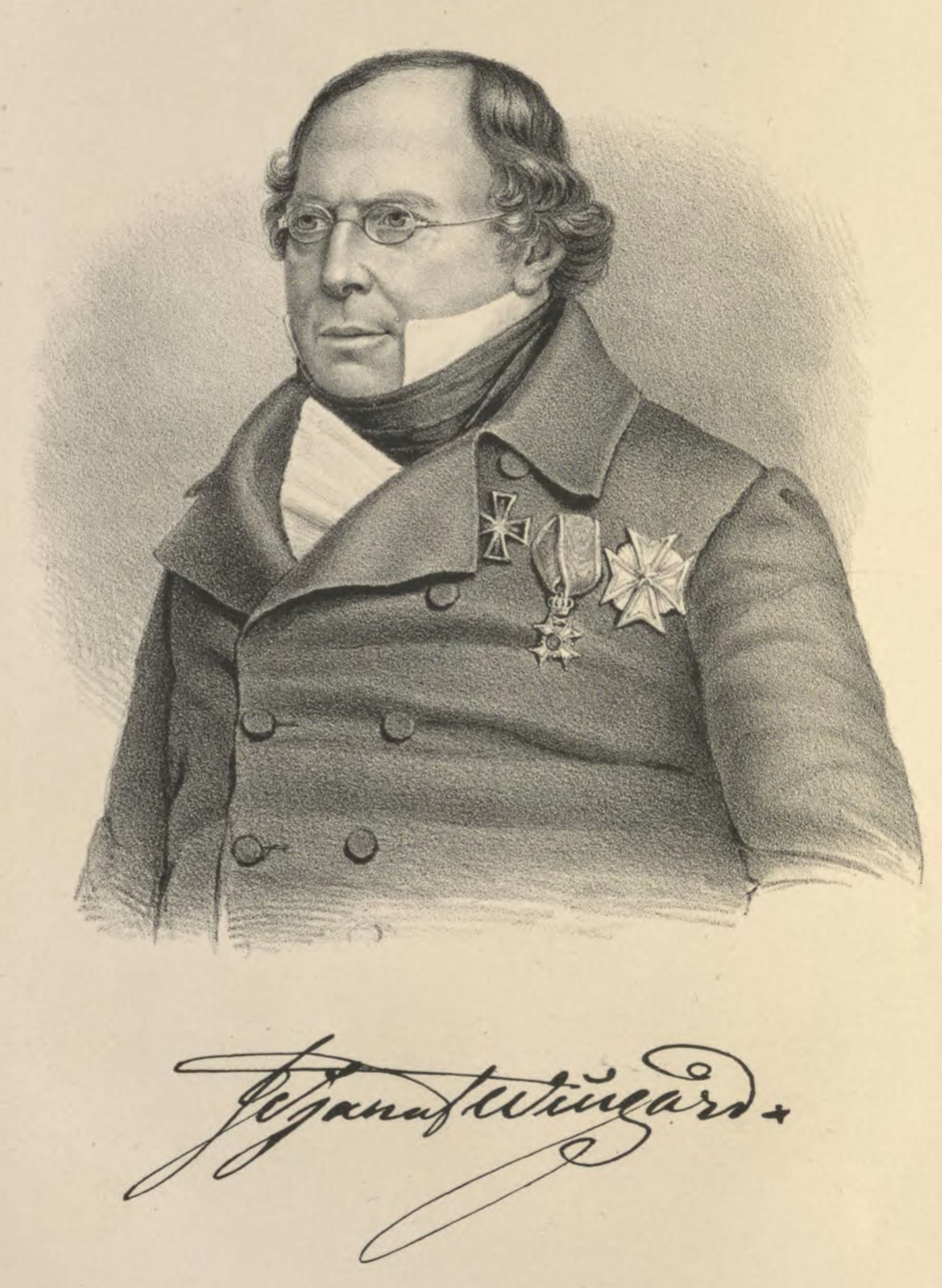

Minister of Finance
- In office 16 May 1840 – 29 December 1842
- Preceded by: Office created
- Succeeded by: Sven Munthe

Governor of Värmland
- In office 5 August 1814 – 16 May 1840
- Preceded by: Elias von Eckstedt
- Succeeded by: Carl Fredrik Hammarhielm

Minister without Portfolio
- In office 1842–1843
- Preceded by: Office created
- Succeeded by: Office abolished

Personal details
- Born: 14 November 1778 Royal Chapel, Stockholm, Sweden
- Died: 21 February 1854 (aged 75) Stockholm, Sweden
- Spouse: Fredrika Björnberg
- Relatives: Wingård family
- Occupation: Statesman

Johan Didrik af Wingård (né Wingård; 14 November 1778 - 21 February 1854) was a Swedish statesman, military official and illustrator who served as the first Swedish Minister of Finance from 1840 to 1842 and Chief of the Artillery Staff from 1813 to 1814.

== Early life ==
Johan af Wingård was born 14 November 1778 in Stockholm, Sweden, a late son of the statesman Johan Wingård and noblewomen Fredrika af Darelli. His older brother, Archbishop Carl Fredrik af Wingård, was also a Lord of the Realm.

In 1793, he enrolled as a student of Uppsala University, studying state affairs, military affairs and theology.

== Military service ==
In 1793, he enlisted in the Army of Sweden and became, sergeant at Stedingkska Regiment, a non-commissioned officer. On 13 May 1793, he was he was appointed as a commissioned officer as Fänrik. In 1801, he was became a second lieutenant at the Göta Artillery Regiment and later that year, on 26 October 1801, was promoted to staff lieutenant. On 22 September 1802, Wingård was again promoted to Captain of the Army.

On 20 February 1808, he enrolled at the Royal Swedish Academy of War Sciences as an artillery staff officer. On 10 July 1809, he was commissioned as major in the Army and adjutant general of the Göta Artillery Regiment.

In 1813, lieutenant colonel and chief of the artillery staff. On 13 May 1814, he received the title of Knight of the Royal Order of the Sword (RSO).

== Governorship ==
On 3 May 1814, Wingård was appointed as acting governor of Värmland and chairman of the Regional Agricultural Society. On 7 March 1815, he was officially appointed Governor of Värmland. He served as governor, for 25 consecutive years, from 1815 to 1840.

In 1824, Wingård was elected honorary member of the Royal Swedish Academy of Science (HedLKrVA). On 31 August 1829, received the title of knight of the Order of the North Star (KNO)

== Ministerial career ==
In 1840, Johan af Wingård was, against his wishes, nominated as minister of finance by brother Carl Fredrik af Wingård. In 1842, he was demoted to consultative state council (minister without portfolio) and was dismissed from office in on 18 December 1843. On 14 October 1844, he was promoted to Commander of the Order of the North Star (kmstkNO) and received the Commander Cross of the Royal Order of Charles XIII (RCXIII:sO) on 28 January 1848. He published his memoirs in 12 volumes from 1846 to 1850. This memoir collection is considered in the Svensk Uppslagsbok from 1940 to be very entertaining, though not particularly credible. He was ennobled in 1799 for his father's merits with the name “af Wingård.” In addition to his duties, he was active as a painter and illustrator, and, according to Fredrik Boije, was a great art enthusiast and skilled draftsman. Wingård is represented at Uppsala University Library with a red chalk drawing of a study head of a bearded man.

== Literature ==
Wingård published several works, including Militäriska paradoxer (Military Paradoxes, 1809), Uppsats om artilleriundervisningen (Essay on Artillery Education, 1816), Håkan Westgöthe, Läsning för menige man (Håkan Westgöthe, Reading for Commoners, 1828), Minnen af Händelser och Förhållanden under en lång lifstid (Memoirs of Events and Circumstances During a Long Lifetime, 1846–1850), and En Pietists resa till sin Graf, Allegorisk imitation (A Pietist's Journey to His Grave, Allegorical Imitation, 1851).

== Later life ==
On 21 February 1854, he died childless in Stockholm, thereby ending both his own family and the entire noble lineage on the male side. He was buried at the Tölö Churchyard.

== Private life ==
He owned the estate of Edsgatan in the rural parish of Karlstad. He was married on August 18, 1810, at Partille in the parish of the same name in Göteborg and Bohus County to Fredrika Björnberg, from whom he was later divorced. She was born on January 21, 1793, and died on April 5, 1859, in Stockholm. She was the daughter of Niklas Björnberg, a merchant in Gothenburg and a councillor of commerce, and Anna Maria Jönsson.

== See also ==
- Wingård family
- Johan Wingård
- List of Swedish Ministers of Finance

== Sources ==
=== Prints ===
- Nordisk familjebok archived by Project Runeberg at Runeberg.org: see. Johan Didrik af Wingård
- Svensk uppslagsbok, band 29: Utvångstorp - Väggmossa, 1940
- Adelsvapen
- Svenskt konstnärslexikon del V, sid 701, Allhems Förlag, Malmö. SELIBR 8390293
