= Östra Torn =

City district of Lund, Sweden

- City district
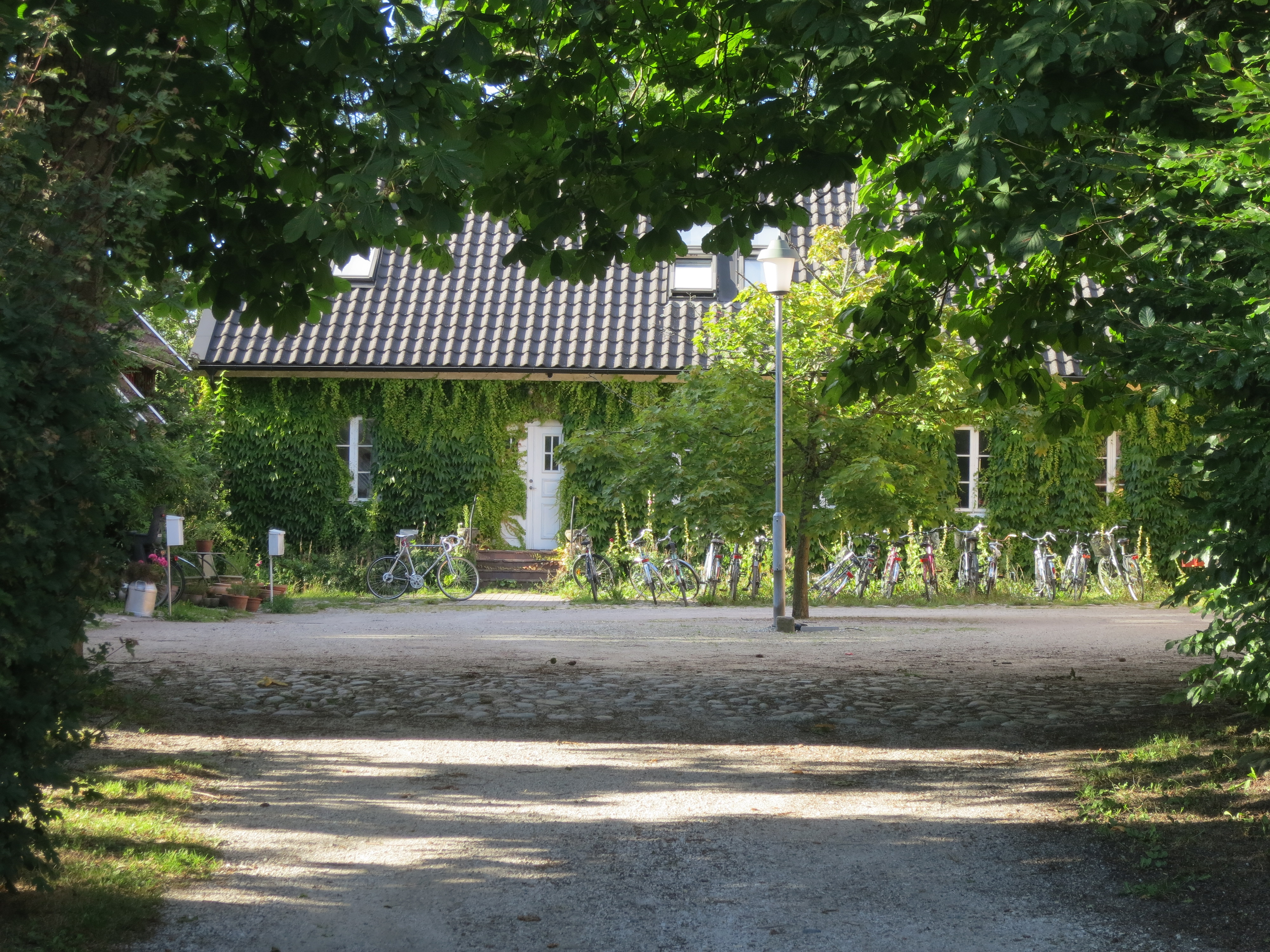
- Farmhouse in the old village core of Östra Torn
- Interactive map of Östra Torn
- Coordinates: 55°42′26″N 13°14′00″E
- Country: Sweden
- City: Lund

Östra Torn is a city district in the east of Lund, Sweden. It grew out of a village first recorded in the early 12th century and became part of the built-up city in the 1970s. Together with the neighbouring Mårtens fälad, it forms the statistical district of Östra Torn–Mårtens fälad, which had about 10,000 inhabitants in 2014.

== History ==
=== Village ===
The village of Torn is first mentioned around 1120, in a record stating that the Danish king Sweyn Estridsen had granted land "In villa Thorni" to the bishop's church in Lund. The name Östra Torn ("East Torn") appears in Latinized form in 1228, and is probably connected with the name of the surrounding Torna Hundred. The site had earlier served as a place of worship and assembly. Into the 20th century the village was also called Skinnartorn, a byname first recorded in 1648 as "Skiden Thorn", from a word that could mean dirty or inferior, probably a reference to its soils being poorer than those of the neighbouring village of Vallkärratorn.

The village belonged to the church for most of its history, and building there was tightly restricted. Its farms passed to the crown after the Reformation, but in 1681 Charles XI granted the estate of the former All Saints' monastery, with its thirteen farms including Östra Torn, as a fief to the bishops of Lund. The farmers held their land in return for unlimited labour service (hoveri) on the bishop's demesne.

=== Land reform ===
In the early 19th century Östra Torn was a dense row village of about 20 farms. At the enskifte land consolidation, begun in 1813 at the request of Bishop Wilhelm Faxe and formally confirmed in 1824, nearly half of the farms were moved out onto the surrounding fields. The farmers petitioned the crown in 1838 to be allowed to buy their holdings as freeholds; the dispute with Faxe led to evictions. The labour-service system was abolished by Faxe's successor, Henrik Reuterdahl, after Faxe's death. The remaining day-labour obligations of the village cottagers were converted to money payments in 1926, and the cottage holders bought their properties in the 1930s.

=== Part of the city ===
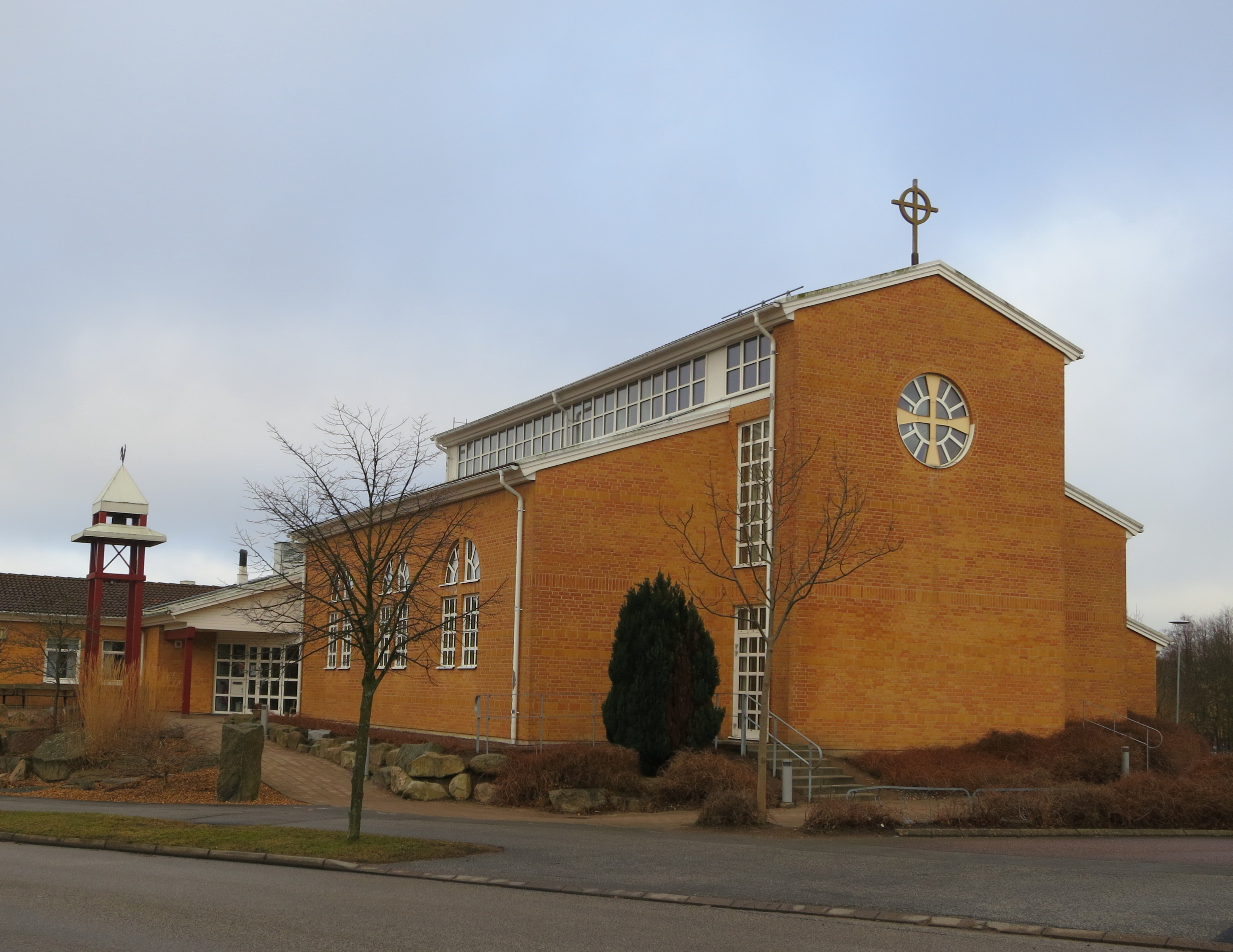
Maria Magdalena Church in Östra Torn

The village belonged to Lund's rural parish until it was incorporated into the city of Lund in 1944. Östra Torn became part of the built-up city during the 1970s, when Lund's growth reached the village. A development plan drawn up in 1965 and adopted by the city council in 1967 reserved the area north of the village for some 3,000 student dwellings and the area south of it for about 1,350 ordinary dwellings, while the old village core was to be preserved and kept free of through traffic.

== Notable people ==
The rapper Timbuktu (Jason Diakité) grew up in Östra Torn.
