= Amalia Lindegren =

Swedish artist (1814–1891)

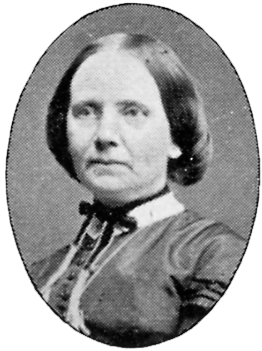
- Born: 22 May 1814; Stockholm, Sweden
- Died: 27 December 1891 (aged 77); Stockholm, Sweden

Amalia Euphrosyne Lindegren (22 May 1814 – 27 December 1891) was a Swedish artist and painter. She was a member of the Royal Swedish Academy of Arts (1856).

== Biography ==
Amalia Lindegren was born in Stockholm on 22 May 1814 to Anna Catharina Ekström (d. 1817), who later took the surname Lindgren when she married the caretaker Anders Lindgren. After the death of her mother, she was adopted by the wealthy widow of her alleged biological father, the nobleman Benjamin Sandels. Her position as a child was somewhat humiliating, as a form of charity object for the upper classes, and in her later work, her paintings of sad little girls are believed to be inspired by her childhood.

She displayed an early talent, making and selling drawings in the manner of Maria Röhl: she started to paint in oil in 1839, became a student of Sofia Adlersparre in 1842, and participated in her first exhibition the following year.

In 1846, her drawings were noted by the artist and art teacher Carl Gustaf Qvarnström (1810–1867), who was impressed and, through his connections made her one of the four women accepted as students at the Royal Swedish Academy of Arts in 1849, the other three being Lea Ahlborn, Agnes Börjesson and Jeanette Möller. At the time women could only study at the academy by dispensation, as women students where not formally accepted to study at the same terms as male students at the Academy before 1864. In 1850, she became the first woman student to be given a scholarship by the academy to study art in Paris. In Paris, she was the student of Léon Cogniet and then Ange Tissier; in 1854, she studied at the Alte Pinakothek in Münich, in 1854–55 in Rome, and participated in the World Exhibition of Paris in 1856 before returning to Sweden in 1856. She visited Paris again in 1859.

Lindegren socialized with famed culture personalities of the era such as Fredrika Bremer, Olof Eneroth, Wendela Hebbe and Sophie Adlersparre, but she was described as a silent and modestly humble introvert, who never married, had any lovers or spoke much at social occasions, who: "lived a retiring life without making a fuss about herself, worked hard and was seldom or never satisfied with what she produced".

She died in Stockholm on 27 December 1891 at the age of 77.

=== Artist ===
Lindegren is associated with the Düsseldorf school of painting. She painted portraits and genre and was inspired by Adolph Tidemand, Hans Gude and Per Nordenberg and the contemporary German style.

The painting she sent home from her studies in Paris was a scene of the drinking of alcohol, which according to the academy was "for a woman a surprising motif [...] This drinking scene bears no traces of having been painted by a spinster."

In 1857, she made a study trip to Dalarna, and her paintings in the sentimental style with motifs of peasant everyday life from Dalarna, often of sad little girls (thought to be inspired by her childhood) was to make her "The most popular Swedish woman painter of her time".

Her perhaps most famed painting, Lillans sista bädd ('The Final Rest of The Little One') was displayed in Paris in 1867, in Philadelphia in 1876, and in Chicago in 1893.

As a portrait painter, she was recommended for her talent of observation and likeness of the object, and was regarded to be one of two most fashionable portrait painters alongside Uno Troili, and once painted the queen, Louise of the Netherlands.

=== Recognitions ===
Lindegren became an agré in 1853, a title given to younger artists who worked in the spirit of the Royal Swedish Academy of Arts, and in 1856 she became a member. She was an honorary member of the British Female artists Society in London, and awarded the Litteris et Artibus.

== Gallery ==
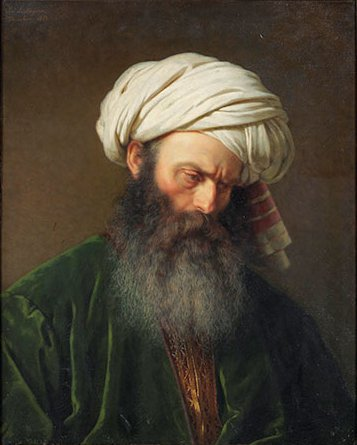
Study of a Man in Turkish Dress, 1854

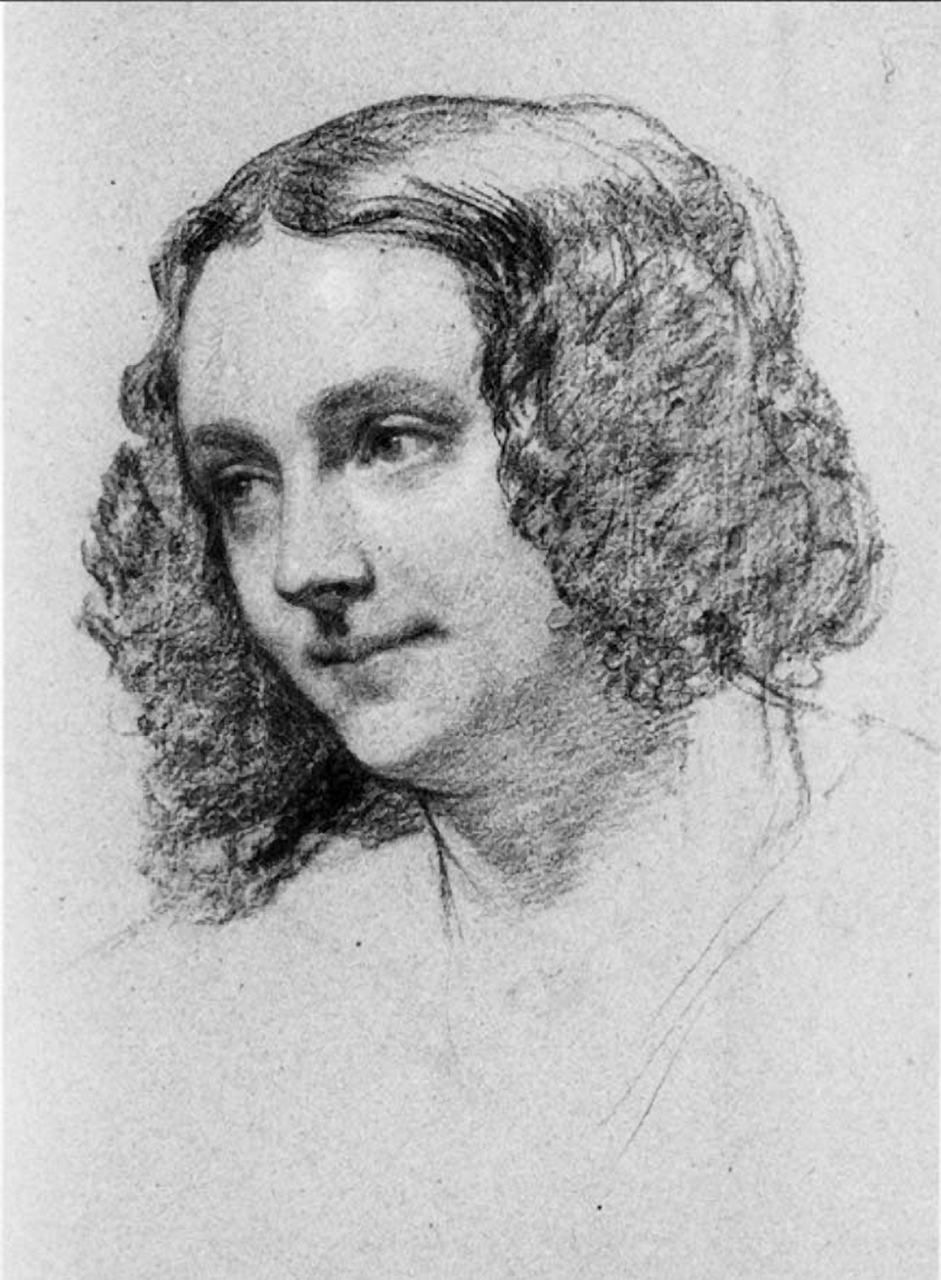
Porträttstudie av ung kvinna

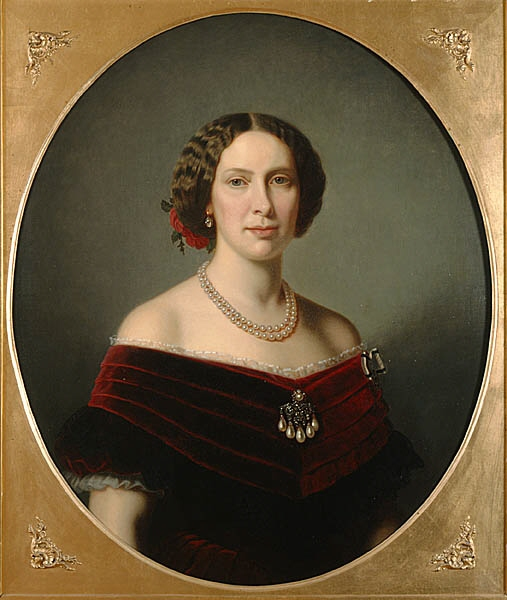
Lovisa (Vilhelmina Fredrika Alexandra Anna Lovisa), 1828–71, 1859

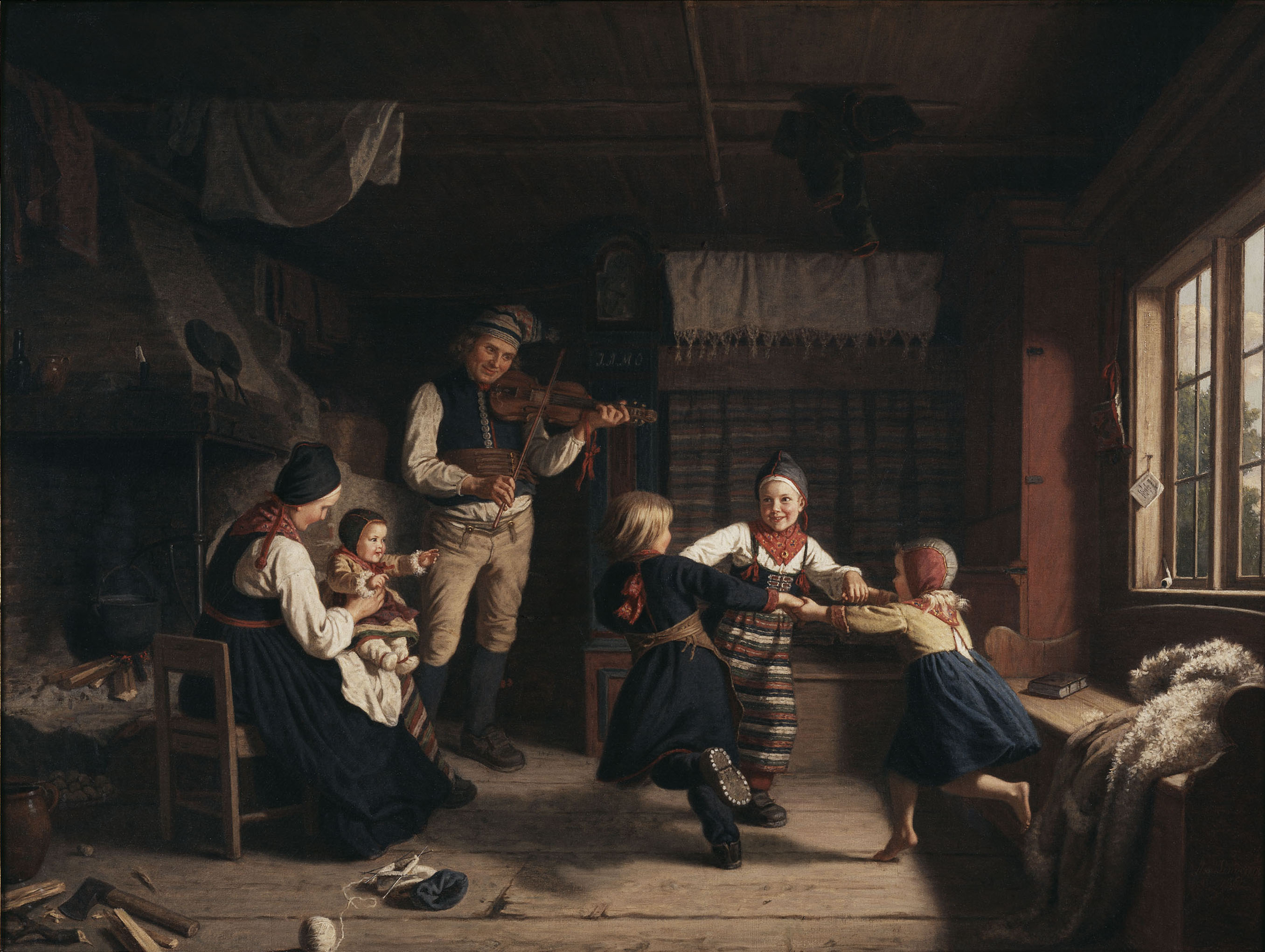
Söndagsafton i en dalastuga, 1860

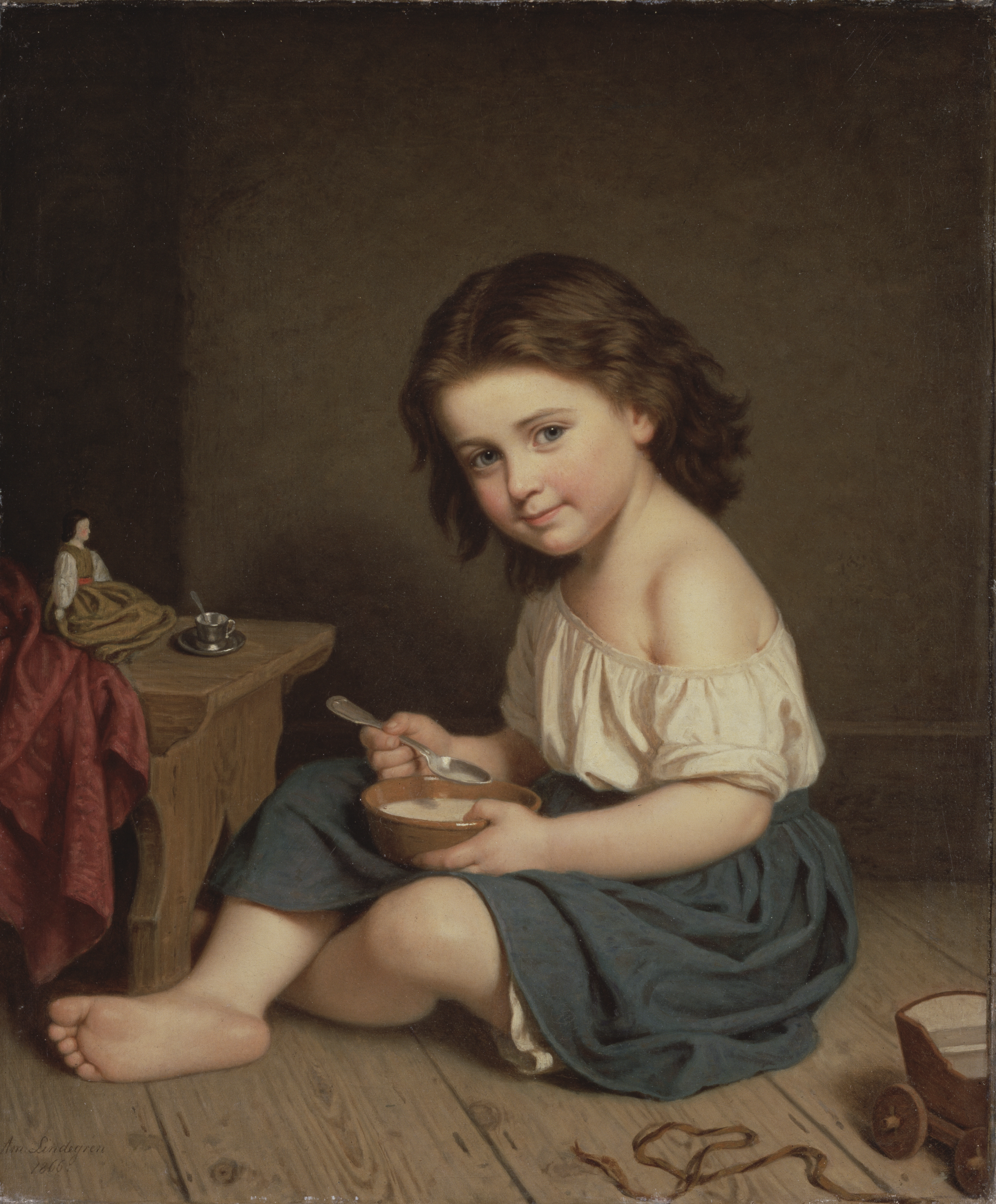
Frukosten, 1866

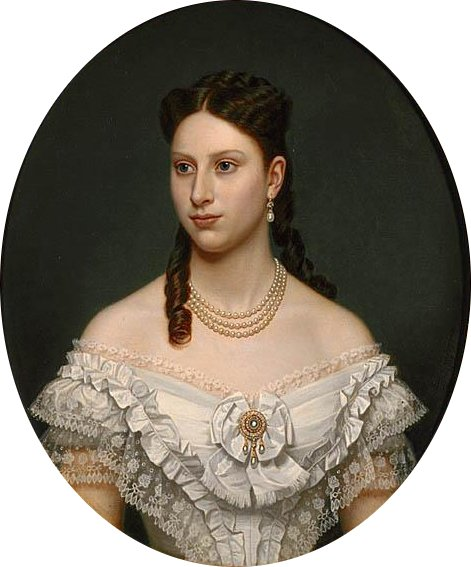
Lovisa of Sweden, 1873

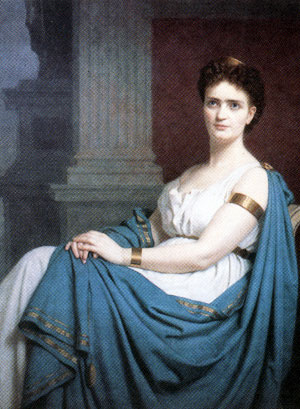
Signe Hebbe, circa 1890

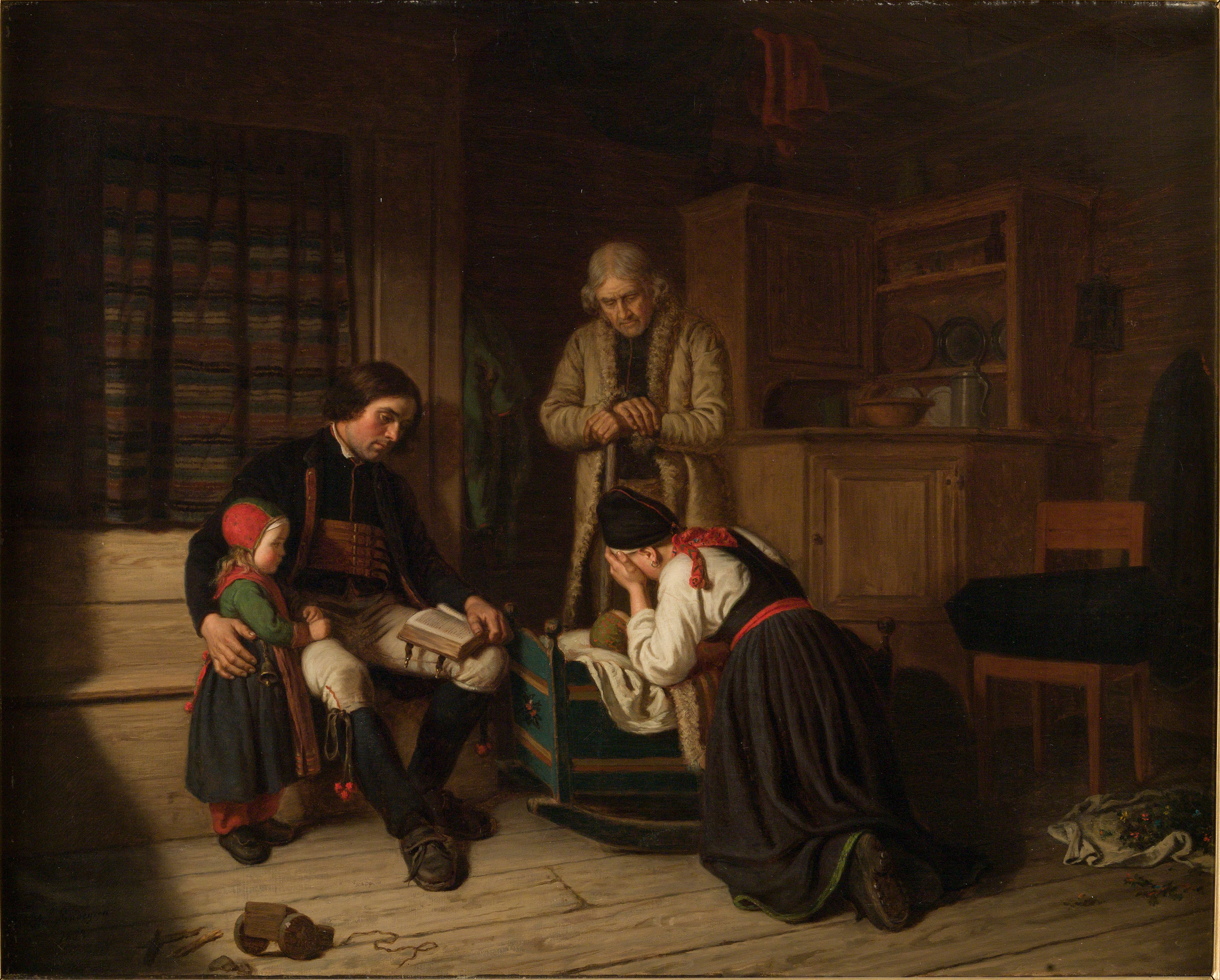
'The last bed of The Little One'

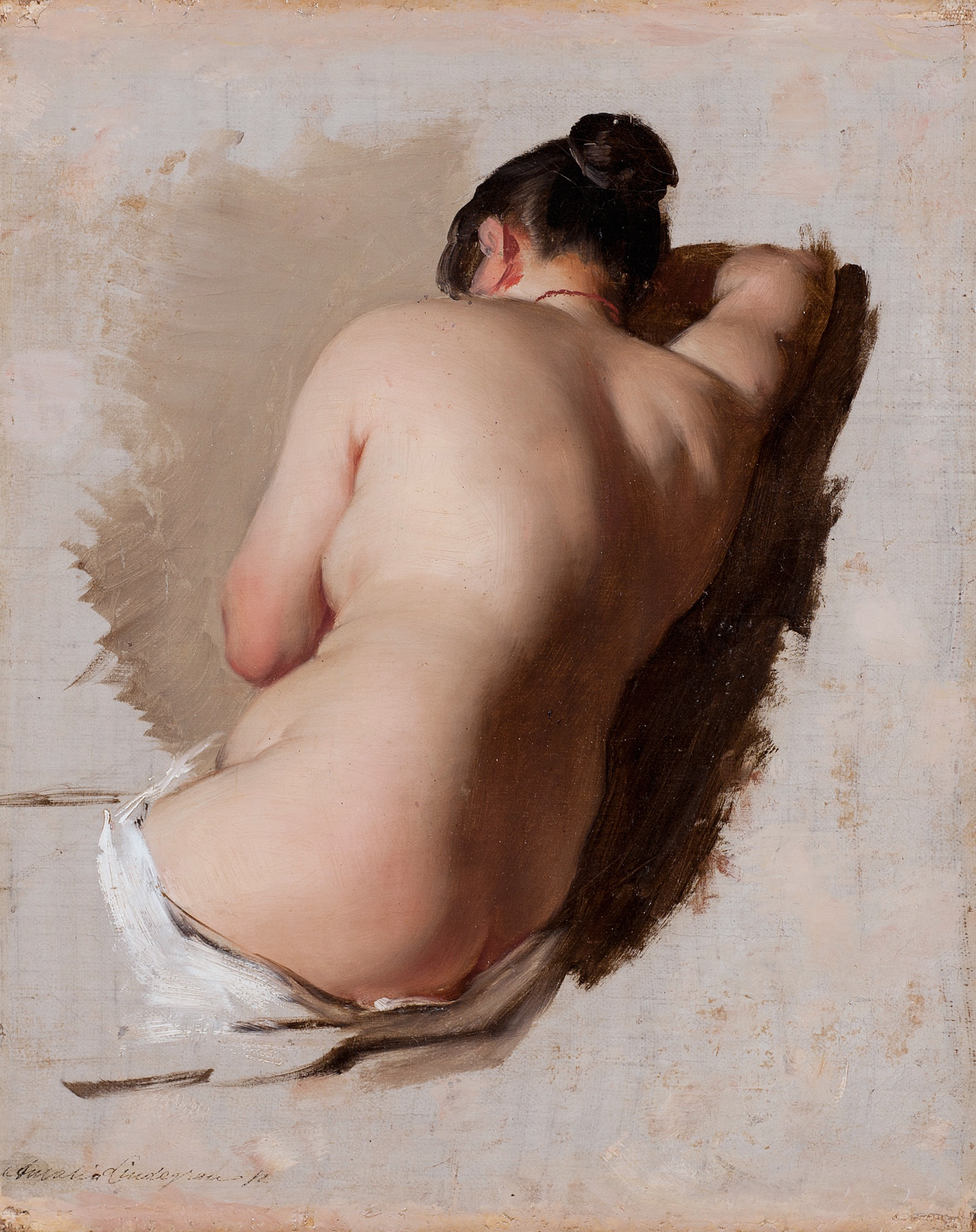
Study of a female model
