= Carl Wingård =

Carl Wingård may refer to:

- Carl-Gunnar Wingård (1894–1977), Swedish actor
- Carl Fredrik af Wingård (1781–1851), Swedish archbishop , professor, and politician
