= Lea Ahlborn =

Swedish artist (1826–1897)

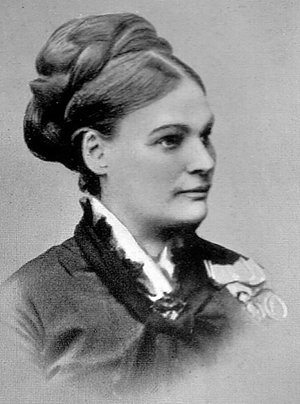
Lea Ahlborn

Lea Fredrika Ahlborn (née Lundgren) (18 February 1826 – 13 November 1897) was a Swedish artist and medallist. She was a member of the Royal Swedish Academy of Arts and the first woman to be appointed royal printmaker. The position of royal printmaker was counted as a public office, and thereby made her the first female official or civil servant in Sweden.

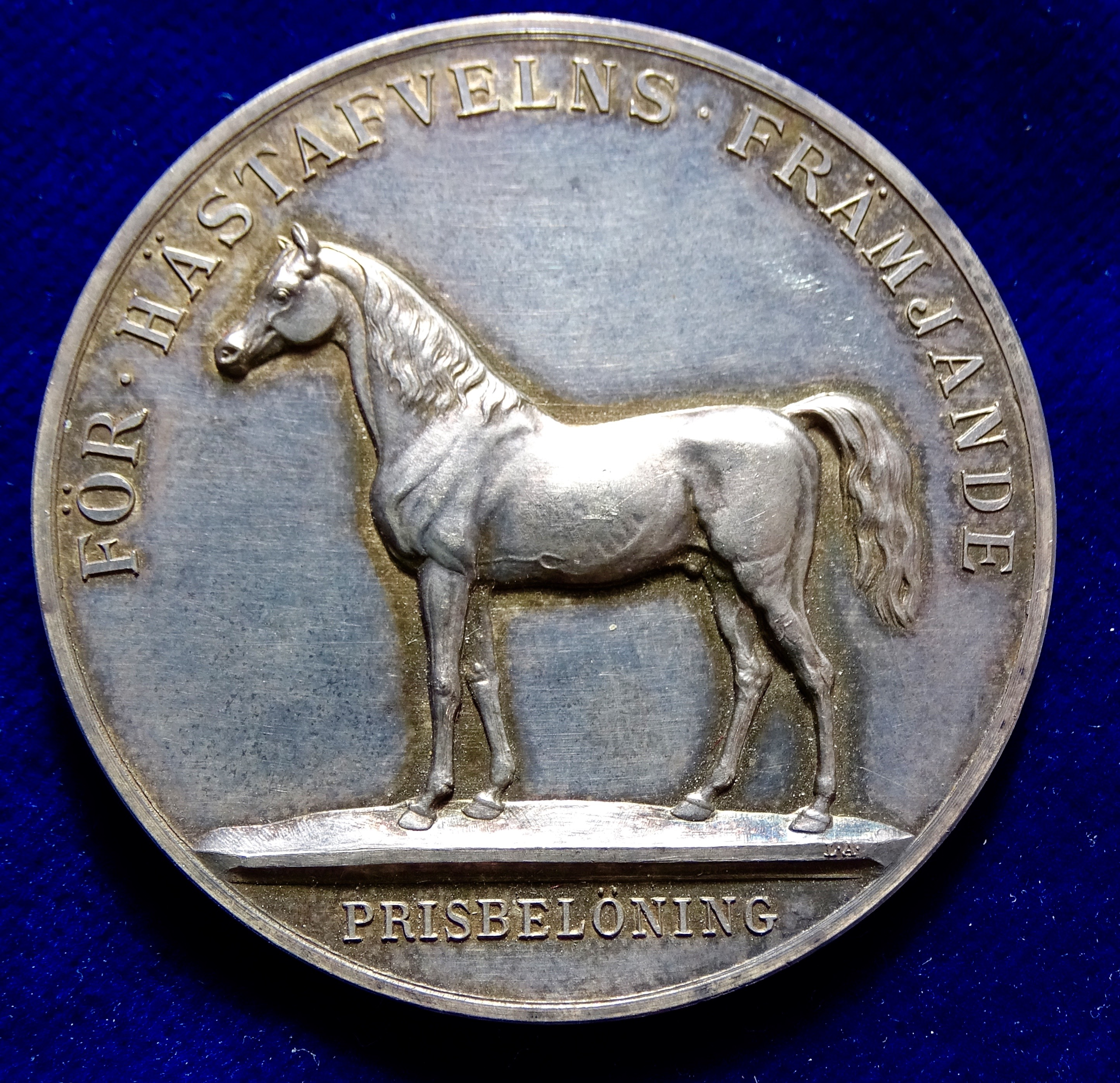
Sweden's Horse Award Silver Medal, engraved by Lea Ahlborn

== Biography ==
She was the child of engraver and medalist Ludwig Peterssen Lundgren (1789–1853) and his wife the artist Rebecca Johanna Salmson (1797–1861). Her mother was the daughter of German-born sculptor Salm Salmson (1766–1822) and the sister of medal designer Johan Salmson (1798–1859).

Lea Ahlborn early decided to follow her father in his profession. In 1849, together with Amalia Lindegren, Jeanette Möller and Agnes Börjesson, she became one of the four women who were given special permission to study art at the Royal Swedish Academy of Arts (Swedish: Kungliga Akademien för de fria konsterna), which was then not yet officially open to women students, although female students were accepted with special dispensation.

In 1851, she made a study trip to Paris with her academy instructor Carl Gustaf Qvarnström (1810–1867) and her brother Pehr Henrik Lundgren (1824–1855), where she trained with the sculptor Armand Toussaint (1806–1862), sculptor Jean-Auguste Barre (1811–1896) and her maternal uncle, Johan Salmson.

In 1853, she returned to Sweden. That same year her father died, and she functioned as royal printmaker while awaiting the return of her brother, who decided to take over their father's position. However, her brother subsequently died while in Paris. In 1855, she was appointed royal printmaker and elected as a member in the Royal Swedish Academy of Arts. She kept herself updated in everything regarding her work, and was given assignments from the Swedish Academy, Royal Swedish Academy of Sciences and the Royal Swedish Pro Patria Society in Stockholm and by Empress Eugenie of France.

In 1881, she made the medal portraits for the celebration of the wedding of the future King Gustav V and Queen Victoria. She was hired by the Government of the United States to make the medal of George Washington in 1883 for the centenary of the end of the American War of Independence and in 1892 for the celebration of Christopher Columbus' discovery of America.

Her sister, Carolina Weidenhayn, (1822–1902), became the first professional female xylographer, who after studies in Paris 1858–1867, became an instructor (1859–1881) at the University College of Arts, Crafts and Design (Tekniska Skolan) (now Konstfack) in Stockholm, Sweden.

== Personal life ==
Lea Ahlborn married German-born ornamental sculptor Karl Henrik Fredrik Martin Ahlborn (1819–1895). They were the parents of several children including Carl Gustaf Ahlborn (1857–1932) who served as commander of the Karlskrona Coastal Artillery Regiment. She was a member of the women's association Nya Idun. In 1892, she was awarded the Swedish Royal Medal Illis Quorum by King Oscar II of Sweden. She entered retirement on 28 May 1897.

== Gallery ==
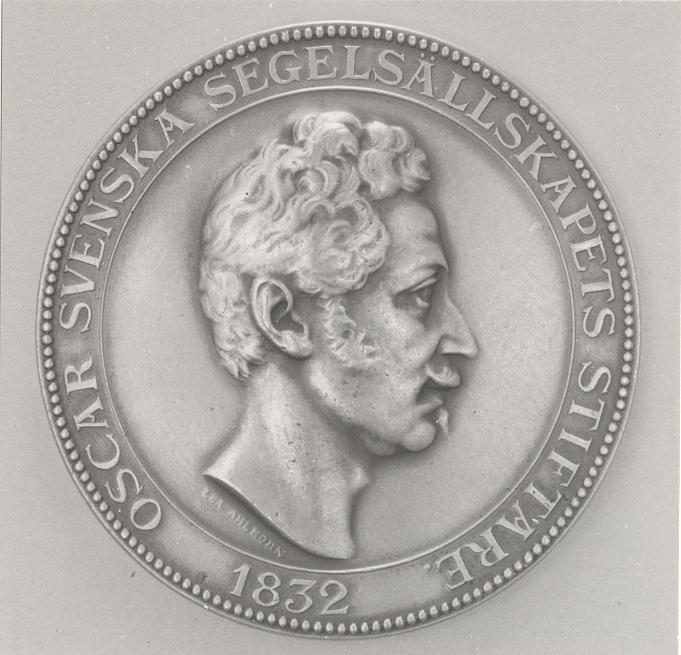
Relief of King Oscar I (obverse)

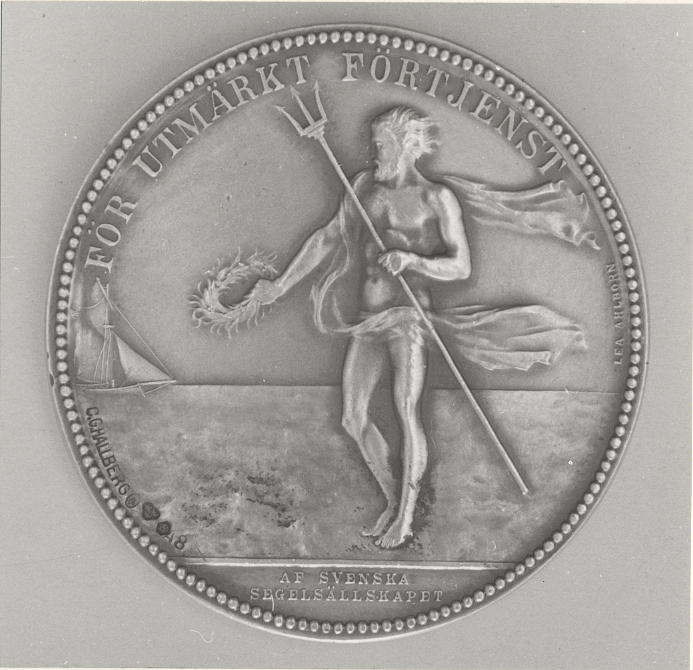
Neptune's wreath for a sailboat (reverse)

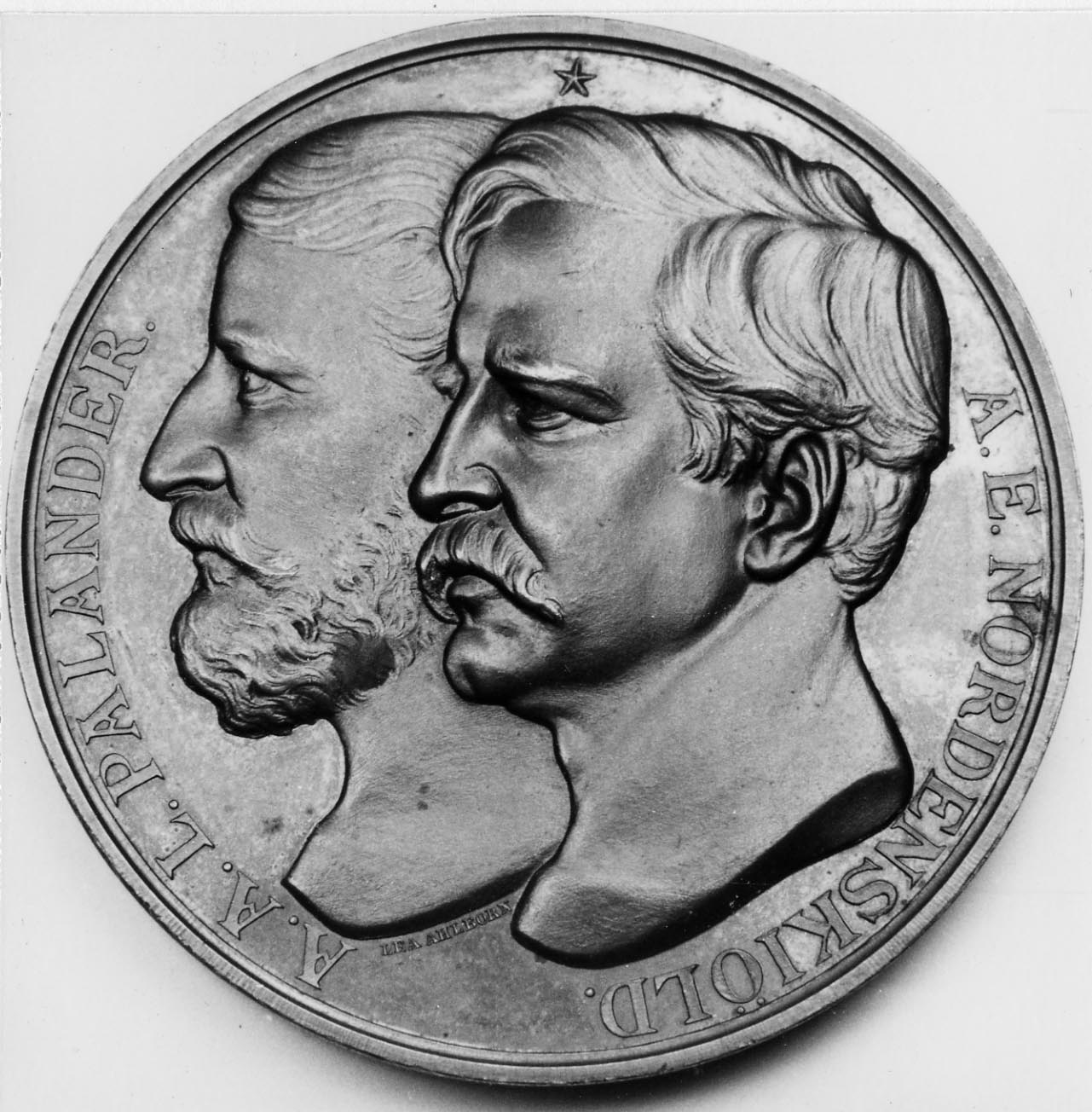
Relief of Adolf Erik Nordenskiöld and Louis Palander (obverse)

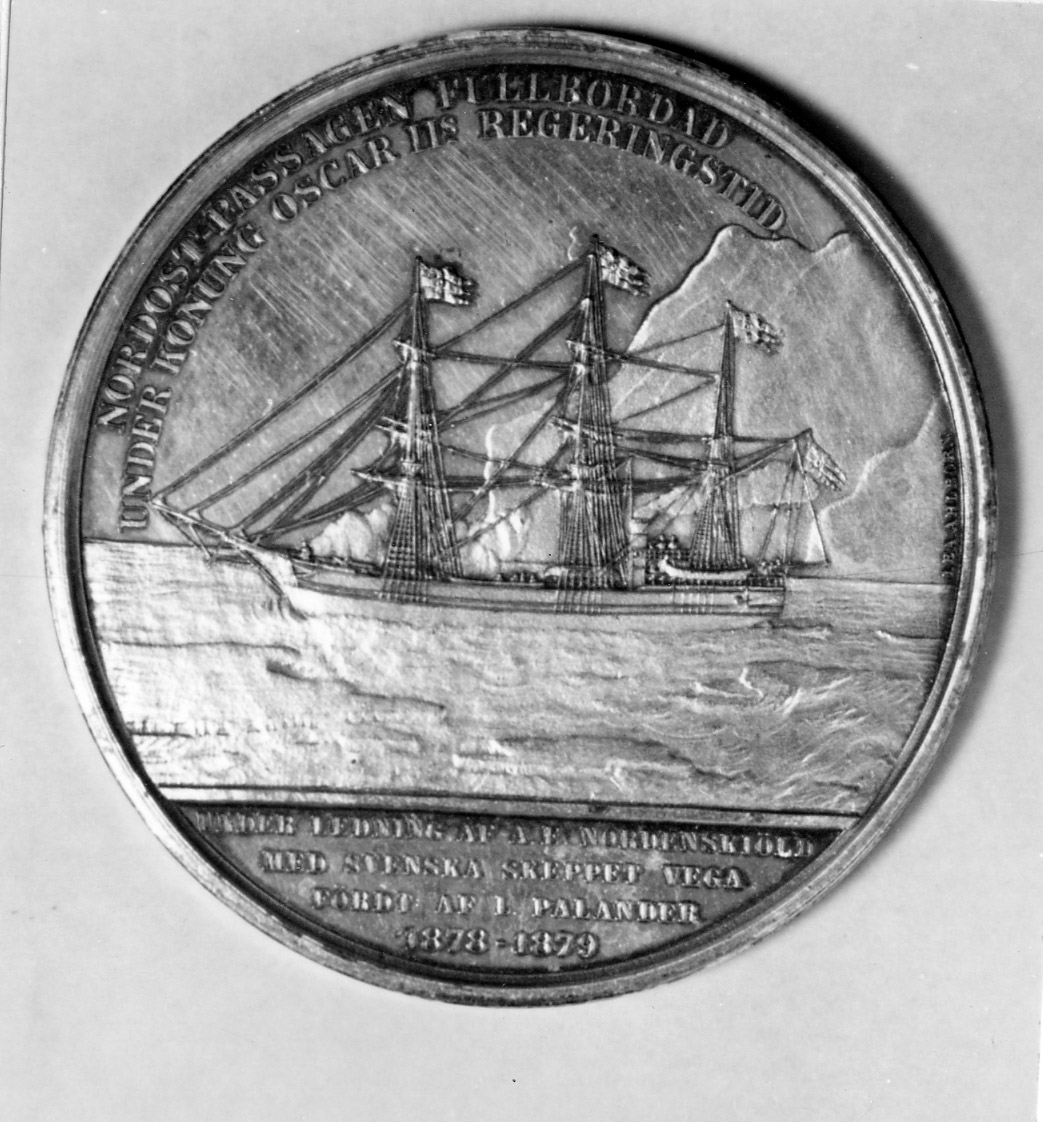
Vega Expedition of 1878–1880 (reverse)

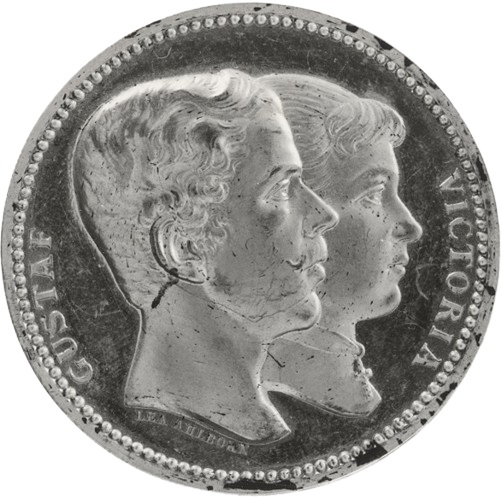
King Gustav V and Queen Victoria wedding (obverse)

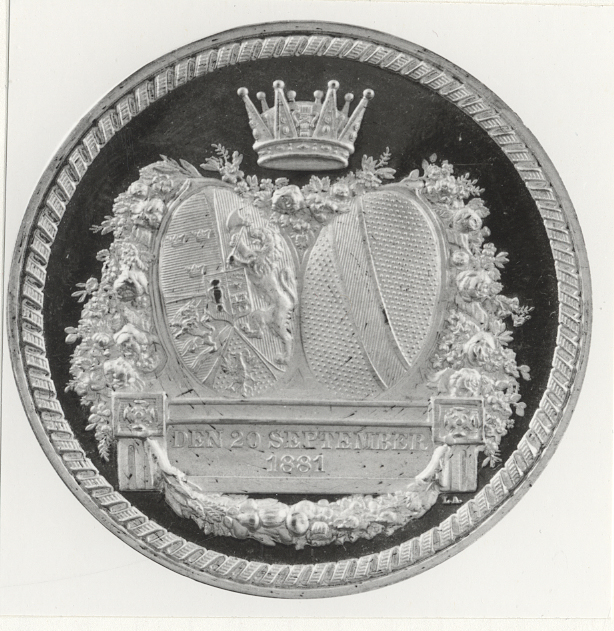
King Gustav V and Queen Victoria wedding (reverse)

== Other sources ==
- Österberg, Carin et al. (1990) Svenska kvinnor: föregångare, nyskapare (Swedish women: Predecessors, pioneers) (Lund: Signum) ISBN 91-87896-03-6 (Swedish)
