= Hvitfeldtska gymnasiet =

High school in Gothenburg, Sweden

Coordinates: 57°41′45.60″N 11°58′26.40″E

- Gothenburg; Sweden

Information
- Type: Public, Day
- Motto: Tradition och förnyelse (Swedish for "tradition and renewal")
- Denomination: Hvitfeldtare
- Established: 1647; 379 years ago
- Founder: Christina, Queen of Sweden
- Sister school: Eutychus Academy- Riruta
- Rector: Johan Gustavsson Haugseth
- Teaching staff: 136
- Grades: 10–12
- Gender: Coeducational
- Enrollment: 2100
- Student to teacher ratio: 14.3
- Language: Swedish (main), English, French, German
- Colour: Maroon White
- Mascot: Rooster
- Newspaper: Hvitbladet
- Alumni: Gamla Hvitfeldtare
- Website: goteborg.se/wps/portal/hvitfeldtska

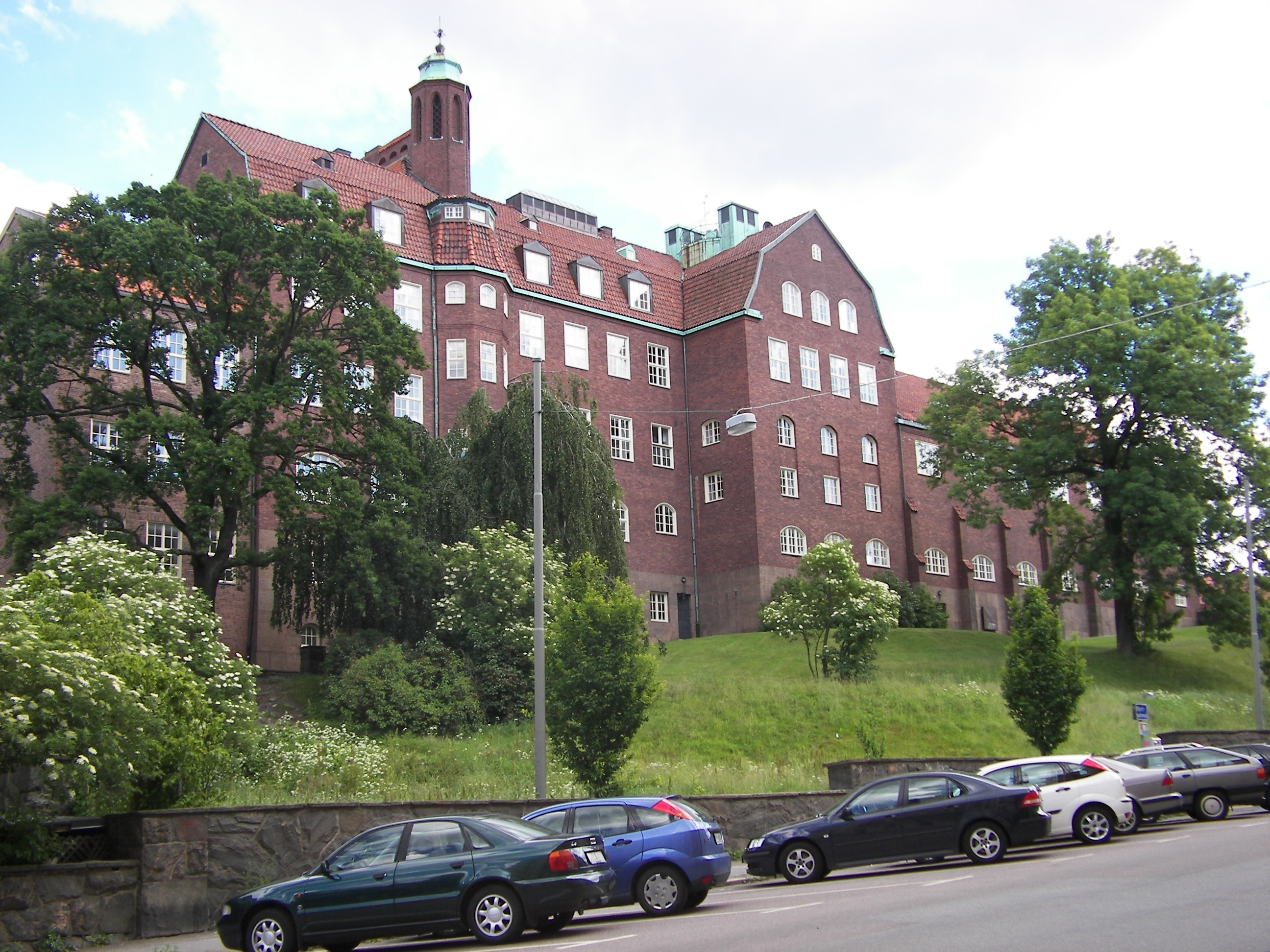
Hvitfeldtska

Hvitfeldtska gymnasiet, the "Hvitfeldtska High School" (gymnasium), is in central Gothenburg, Sweden. The school was founded in 1647 by Queen Christina and is the largest in Gothenburg. It was originally called "Göteborgs gymnasium" and later known as "Göteborgs högre latinläroverk" before being named after its benefactress, the Norwegian-Swedish noblewoman Margareta Hvitfeldt (1608–1683), who left the larger part of her estate to the school.

The school is attended by students aged 15–19 coming from all over Gothenburg, and occasionally from other Swedish regions. International student enrollment is small but significant.

The school runs a variety of student clubs. It serves as one of the limited number of exam centres in Sweden for the SAT, ACT, and Oxbridge admission tests. Annually, some Hvitfeldtska students (also called Hvitfeldtare) get accepted to top summer schools and universities worldwide, and represent Sweden in international competitions.

Hvitfeldtska gymnasiet is known for the events that occurred there during the Gothenburg riots of the EU summit of 2001. This did not involve the staff or the students as such, since, in the summer holidays, the school buildings were used for housing the participants of a youth convent.

The school is divided into two buildings: the northern (the main building), the southern. The school library is in the southern building.

== Education system ==
Hvitfeldtska is divided into four sections: Swedish/national (largest), French, and international (second largest). The school offers many Swedish secondary education programmes including "naturvetenskapsprogrammet" (natural sciences), "samhällsvetenskapsprogrammet" (social sciences), "Hvitfeldtskas affärsprogrammet" (business), "Estetiska programmet" (music), and "handels- och administrationsprogrammet" (management). Students enrolled in the French and German sections travel twice to, and ultimately earn a diploma enabling them to study in France or Germany respectively; they also take the corresponding language courses. In fact, Hvitfeldtska is Sweden's first CertiLingua-certified school. The international section consists of an English-medium International Baccalaureate Diploma Programme (IBDP) and Pre-IB, which each year have only around 100 and 60 places respectively.

Additionally, Hvitfeldtska provides Gothenburg's widest range of language courses, study/travel abroad grants, and Individual Alternatives (IAs). IAs are programmes covering counselling, education, vocational internships etc. for students in the Swedish school system who temporarily require additional support. There are also collaborations with Chalmers University of Technology, University of Gothenburg, and other organisations to improve the educational experience for students. Undertaking international exchange study programs and summer internships are also fairly common in the school.

== Alumni ==
=== Business ===
- Ingvar Kamprad, founder of IKEA
- Roger Holtback, Swedish industrialist, banker, and financier

=== Arts, media, and entertainment ===
- José González (singer), Swedish-Argentinian singer-songwriter
- Thomas Thorild, Swedish poet and critic
- Roy Andersson, Swedish film director
- Rune Andreasson, Swedish comic creator
- Tomas von Brömssen, Swedish actor
- Magnus Carlsson, Swedish singer
- Ulf Dageby, Swedish musician
- Arne Weise, Swedish TV personality
- Sven Wollter, Swedish actor
- Laleh Pourkarim, Swedish singer
- Little Dragon, Swedish music band
- Ebbot Lundberg, Swedish musician
- Anna von Hausswolff, Swedish singer-musician
- Bengt Lidner, Swedish poet
- Ida Redig, Swedish actress and singer/musician
- Sture Hegerfors, Swedish author and journalist
- Bosse Hansson, Swedish journalist, TV host and philatelist
- Kai Martin, Swedish musician and journalist
- Amanda Werne, Swedish musician and songwriter

=== Athletics ===
- Marcus Allbäck, football coach
- Josefin Lillhage, Olympic swimmer

=== Government and politics ===
- Dan-Axel Broström, Swedish shipowner
- Ernst Trygger, Swedish professor and politician
- Carl B Hamilton, Swedish politician
- Susanne Rappmann, Bishop of Gothenburg
- Lars Tobisson, Swedish politician
- Axel Vennersten, Swedish politician
- Jan Eliasson, Swedish diplomat
- Albert Ehrensvärd, Swedish diplomat
