= Wingård family =

Wingård
- Coat of arms of Wingård
- Earlier spellings: Danish: Wingaard; German: Wyngarthener
- Origin: Holy Roman Empire; Denmark; Sweden

The Wingård family (Danish: Wingaard, German: Wyngarthener), is a Danish-Swedish family of German origin from Stuttgart, Duchy of Württemberg, Holy Roman Empire.

== History ==
Hans Wyngarthener (circa 1500–1559) emigrated and settled the first printing press in Denmark in the 16th century. His great-grandson Anders Nielsen Wingaard (circa 1600–1649) relocated to Sweden as the fourth Lutheran Vicar in Krokstad parish, Diocese of Gothenburg, in Bohuslän. His great-great-great-grandson Carl Fredrik was ennobled af Wingård (n:o 2159) in 1799 on the merits of his father during the reign of King Gustav IV Adolf of Sweden.

== Notable members ==
- Johan Wingård (1738-1818), Bishop of the Diocese of Gothenburg and first holder of chair no. 6 of the Swedish Academy
- Johan Didrik af Wingård, (1778-1854), Lieutenant Colonel and Governor of Värmland County
- Carl Fredrik af Wingård (1781-1851), Archbishop of Uppsala, and Professor at Uppsala University
