= Sundsby =

Protected area in Sweden

- Interactive map of the Sundsby area

General information
- Location: Bohuslän, Sweden
- Coordinates: 58°04′13″N 11°41′20″E

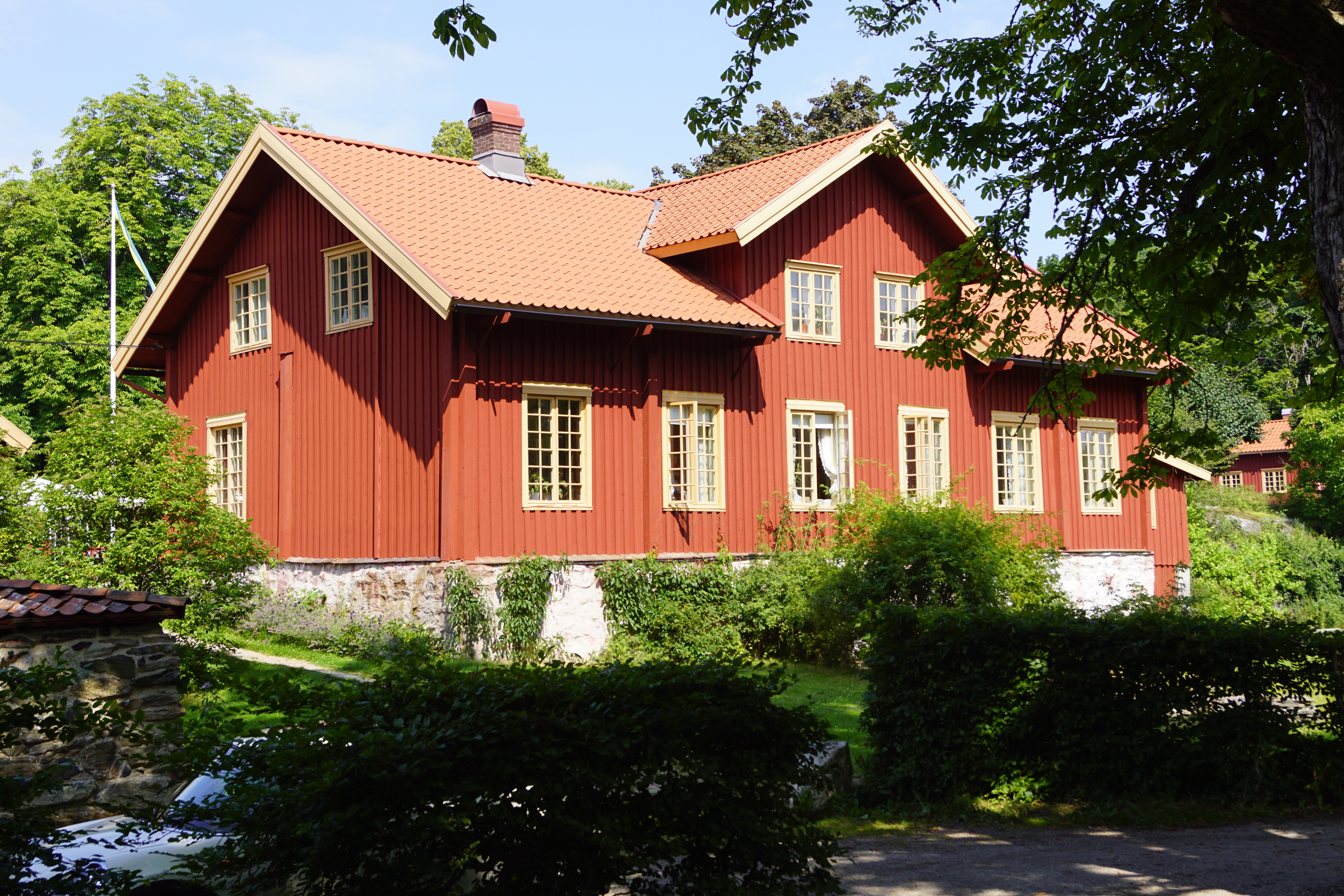
Sundsby säteri

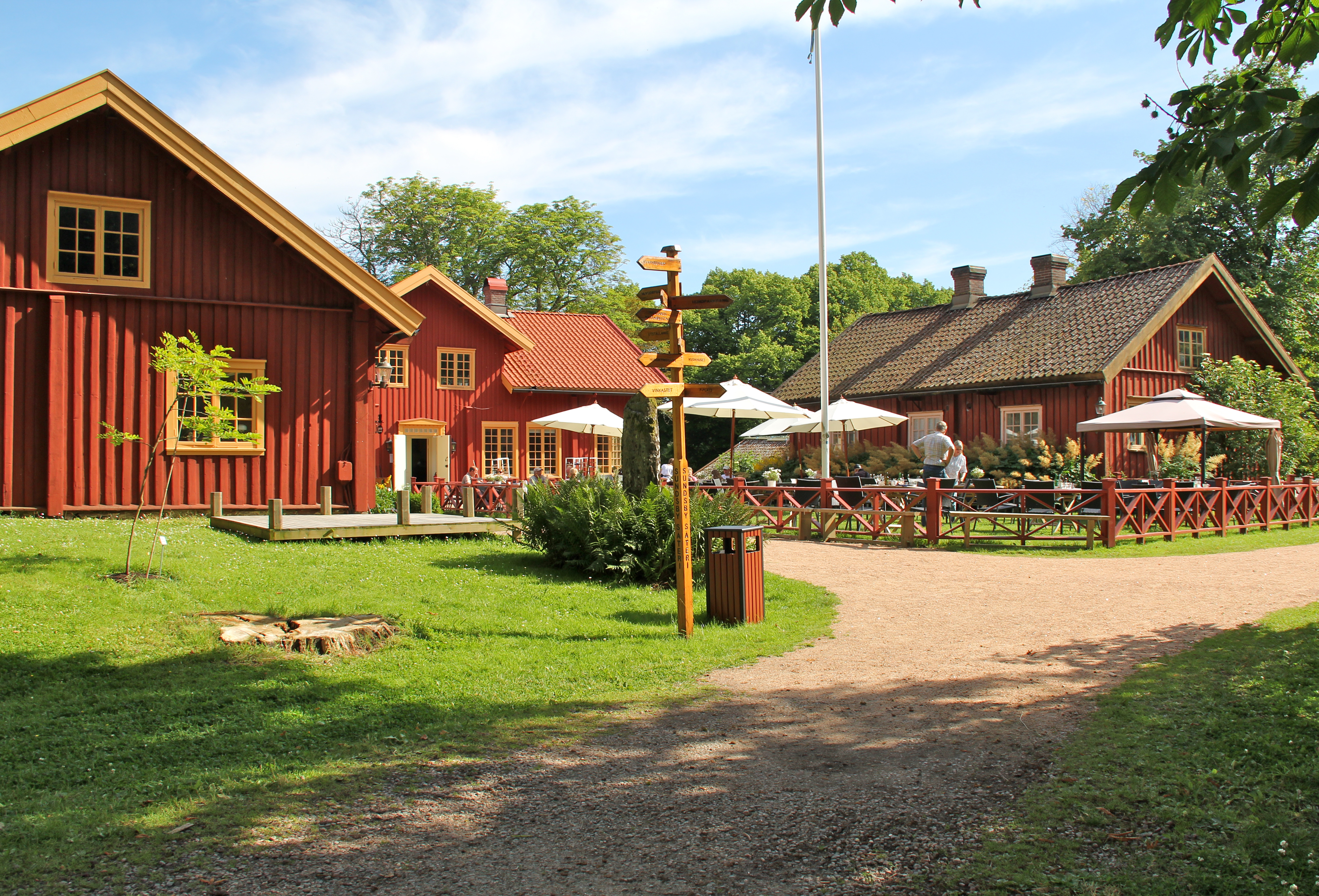
Sundsby säteri

Sundsby is a protected area located on the island of Mjörn at Tjörn Municipality in Bohuslän, Sweden. This is the site of Sundsby Manor (Sundsby säteri).

== Sundsby säteri ==
Sundsby dates to the Middle Ages and was first mentioned in Bishop Eystein's Land Book (Biskop Eysteins jordebok) which was created at the direction of Bishop Eysteinn Erlendsson, Bishop of the Archdiocese of Nidaros during 1388. Eystein's Land Book is an important source of information about land ownership in Eastern Norway during the Middle Ages.

In the second half of the 16th century, it came under the control of Laurits Olofsson Green (ca.1505-1581). His son Anders Lauritsson Green (ca. 1550-1614), who became Norwegian Chancellor, inherited Sundsby and significantly expanded the estate. After he died childless, Sundsby was inherited by his great niece, Margareta Huitfeldt (1608–1683) in 1625. She was the only child of the Danish noble Hartvig Andersen Huitfeldt (1582-1637) and Norwegian noble Bente Jonsdotter Schack (ca.1594-1622). In 1635, she married Danish noble Thomas Iverssön Dyre (1605–1651). She and Thomas Dyre further expanded the estate through purchase of adjacent property. Huitfeldt built an extensive estate complex around the fjords in central Bohuslän.

After Huitfeldt's death in 1683, Sundsby with underlying farms was granted by testament to a scholarship institution, which would be used to support poor gifted youth in Bohuslän. The older buildings burned down in 1720 and new buildings were built circa 1763. An extensive remodel was made in the 1890s. In the 1930s, the barn was refurbished and during the 1940s, the main building's interior was rebuilt.

In 1983, the "Royal and Huitfeldt Scholarship Institution" (Kungliga och Huitfeldtska stipendieinrättningen) sold most of Sundsby to Jesper Rudbäck. Tjörn municipality bought Sundsby in 2003. Since 2006, the area has been accessible to the public. Sundsby Säteri features an exhibition about Margareta Huitfeldt and access to guided tours, together with a cafe, restaurant, shop and bakery. The estate contains a garden surrounded by a hilly, wooded landscape edged by bays. The area is one of the European Union's Special Area of Conservations.
