= Margareta Huitfeldt =

Norwegian-Swedish land owner and philanthropist (1608–1683)

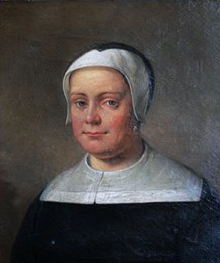
- Portrait of Margareta-Huitfeldt.
- Born: November 5, 1608; Fiskum parish at Eiker Buskerud, Norway
- Died: November 16, 1683 (aged 75); Sundsby in Valla parish in Gothenburg, Sweden
- Occupation: Land owner

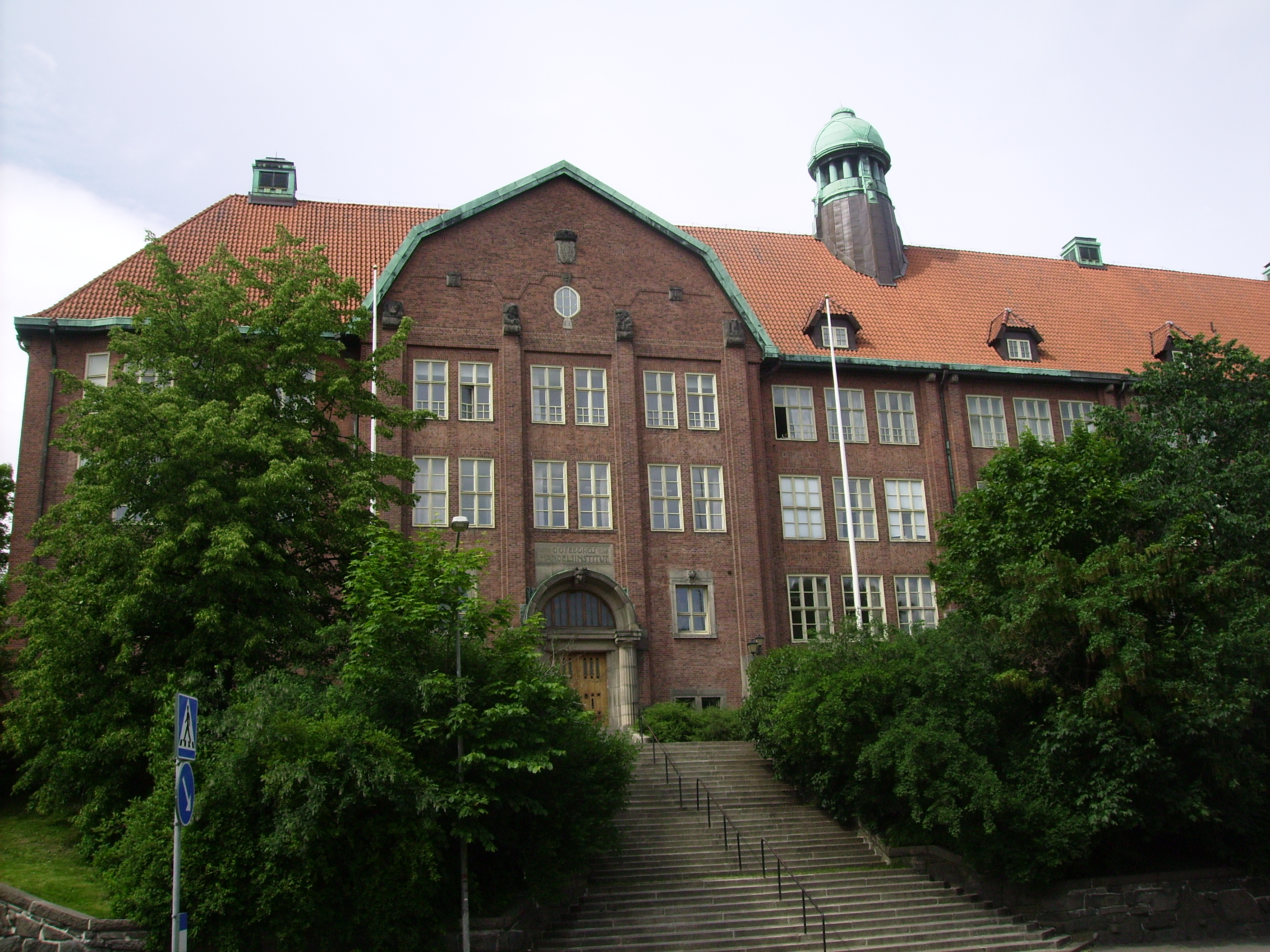
Hvitfeldtska gymnasiet

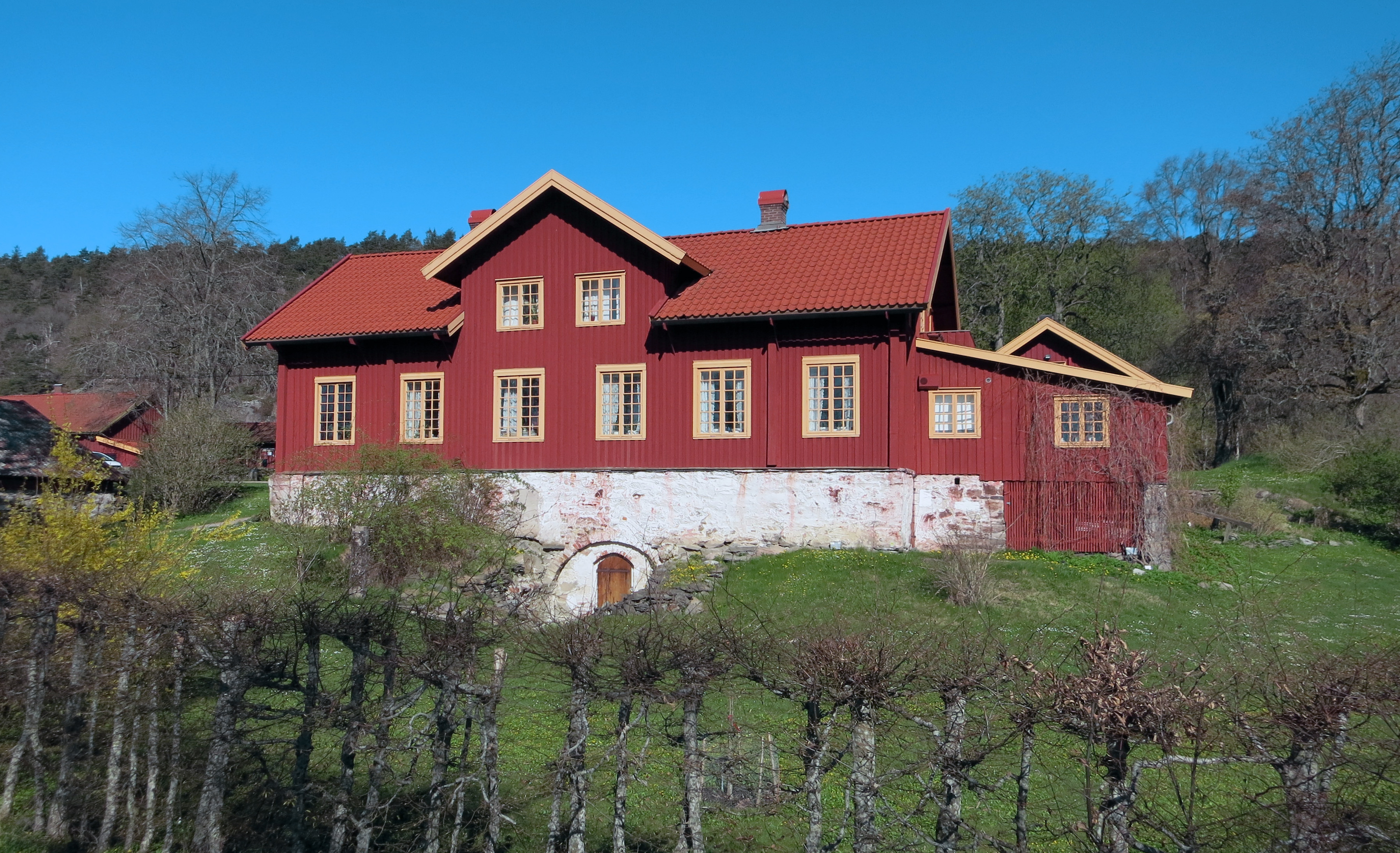
Sundsby Manor

Margareta Huitfeldt (5 November 1608 – 16 November 1683) was a Norwegian-Swedish noblewoman, estate owner and philanthropist. She was the prime benefactor of Hvitfeldtska gymnasiet in Gothenburg, Sweden.

== Biography ==
Margareta Huitfeldt was born at the Skjelbred farm in the parish of Fiskum in the district of Eiker in Buskerud, Norway. She was the only child of the Danish noble Hartvig Andersen Huitfeldt (1582-1637) and Norwegian noble Bente Jonsdotter Schack (ca.1594-1622). In 1635, she married Danish noble Thomas Iverssön Dyre (1605–1651). Of their three children, only their son Iver Dyre (1644-1663) lived past infancy.

She became one of the greatest land owners in Scandinavia as the heir of her parents and her spouse. Most of her properties were situated in Bohuslän, at that time a province of Norway. Her principal holdings included Skjelbred in Eiker and her residence Sundsby Manor (Sundsby säteri) in Bohuslän. Sundsby is located on the island of Mjörn in the parish of Valla in Bohuslän. She had inherited the property in 1625 following the death of her relative, Norwegian Chancellor Anders Lauritsson Green (ca. 1550-1614). She and her husband further expanded the estate through the purchase of adjacent property and built an extensive estate complex. With time, her holdings came to include properties in Skee parish at Fiskebäckskil, at Åby in Tossene parish and on Hisingen as well as sizable portions of Tjörn.

== Legacy ==
Her husband Thomas Dyre died in 1651 and her surviving son Iver Dyre in 1663. Margareta Huitfeldt died in 1683 and was buried at Valla Church. Following the death of her son, she had made a notable donation providing payment for the schooling of students from Bohuslän. Upon her own death, her estate was put under the protection of the Swedish Crown. Her will included a legacy for Valla Church. Her will provided for the larger part of her estate to be donated to Göteborgs gymnasium in Gothenburg which Queen Kristina of Sweden had originally founded in 1647. The school would later be renamed Hvitfeldtska gymnasiet in her honor.

== Other sources ==
- Beata Losman (1984) Margareta Huitfeldt. En biografi (Göteborg: Kungl och Hvitfeldtska Stipendieinrättningen) ISBN 91-970451-1-X
