= Susanne Rappmann =

Swedish theologian (born 1965)

The Right Reverend Susanne Rappmann
- Bishop of Gothenburg
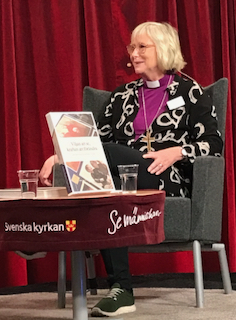
- Church: Church of Sweden
- Diocese: Gothenburg
- Elected: 2018
- Predecessor: Per Eckerdal

Orders
- Ordination: 12 January 1992
- Consecration: 4 March 2018 by Antje Jackelén

Personal details
- Born: 2 February 1965 (age 61) Norra Vram, Skåne, Sweden
- Denomination: Lutheran
- Education: Karlstad University
- Motto: Vår Gud bär sår
- Coat of arms

Susanne Rappmann (née Norrhall; born 2 February 1965 in Norra Vram, Skåne) is a Swedish theologian and current Bishop of Gothenburg.

== Biography ==
Susanne Rappmann was ordained priest for the Diocese of Gothenburg in 1992 and has served as a parish priest of Annedal Church from 1994 till 1999. She later became parish priest of Stensjöns and served between 2007 and 2010. Afterwards she was appointed as the church minister of the parish of Värö-Stråvalla and served between 2010 and 2013. Between 2013 and 2018, she was a curator in Mölndal parish, which was formed in 2014.

In 2005, Rappmann presented her dissertation titled Kristi kropp som kritisk metafor: teologisk reflektion kring funktionshinder (Christ's body as critical metaphor: theological reflection on disability) at Karlstad University.

== Bishop ==
In November 2017, Rappmann was elected bishop during the second and final election gaining around 70% of the votes. Rappmann was consecrated bishop by the Archbishop of Uppsala on 4 March 2018. She became the first female bishop of Gothenburg, replacing Per Eckerdal.
