= List of governors of Värmland County =

Governor of Värmland County
- Landshövding i Värmlands län
- Coat of arms of Värmland County.
- Incumbent; Georg Andrén since 1 January 2019
- Värmland County Administrative Board
- Residence: The residence in Karlstad, Karlstad
- Appointer: Government of Sweden
- Term length: Six years (Note: The governor is often appointed for a six-year mandate. It can be extended if the person has not reached retirement age.)
- Formation: 1779
- First holder: Johan Gustaf Uggla
- Deputy: County Director (Länsrådet)
- Salary: SEK 97,800/month (2017)
- Website: Governor and County Director

This is a list of governors for Värmland County of Sweden. Värmland separated from Närke and Värmland County in 1779, see List of governors of Örebro County before that date.

- Johan Gustaf Uggla (1779–1793)
- Nils Nilsson Silverskjöld (1793–1802)
- Arvid von Nolcken (1802–1807)
- Axel von Rosen (1808–1809)
- Olof af Wibeli (1809–1813)
- Johan Didrik af Wingård (1814–1840)
- Carl Fredrik Hammarhielm (1840–1841)
- Hans Fredrik Oldevig (1842–1864)
- Carl Rudolf Ekström (1864–1870)
- Johan Henrik Rosenswärd (1870–1873)
- Henrik Wilhelm Gyllenram (1873–1885)
- Henrik Adolf Widmark (1885–1889)
- Emil Adolf Malmborg (1889–1901)
- Gerhard Dyrssen (1901–1921)
- Abraham Unger (1921–1936)
- Ivar Wennerström (1936–1945)
- Axel Westling (1945–1957)
- Gustaf Nilsson (1957–1967)
- Rolf Edberg (1967–1977)
- Bengt Norling (1977–1990)
- Ingemar Eliasson (1990–2002)
- Kerstin Wallin (2003–2004)
- Eva Eriksson (2004–2012)
- Kenneth Johansson (2012–2018)
- Johan Blom (2019–2019) (acting)
- Georg Andrén (2019–present)
