= Hans Olof Holmström =

Swedish archbishop (1784-1855)

The Most Reverend Hans Olof Holmström
- Archbishop of Uppsala; Primate of Sweden
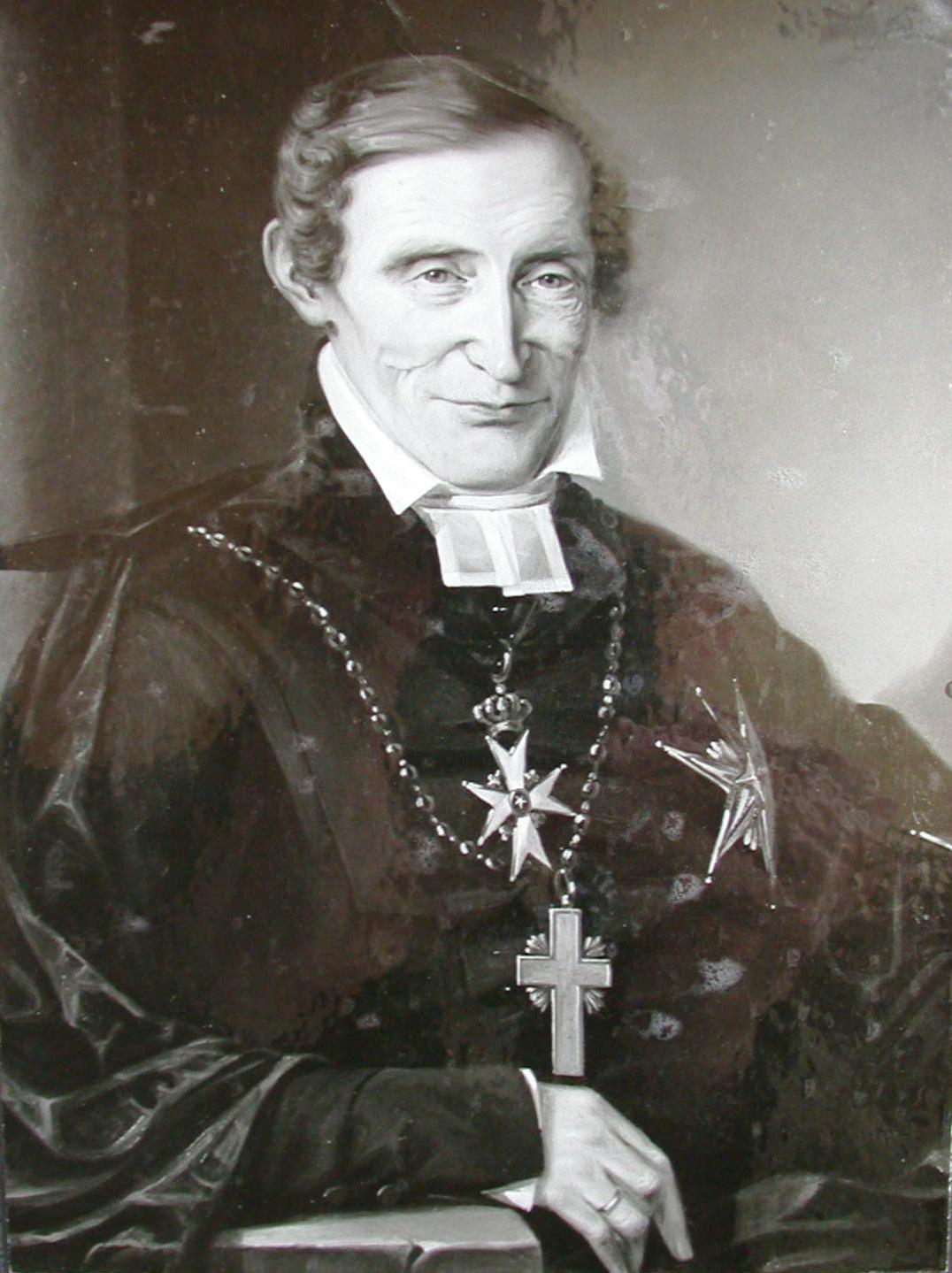
- Church: Church of Sweden
- Archdiocese: Uppsala
- Appointed: 1852
- In office: 1852–1855
- Predecessor: Carl Fredrik af Wingård
- Successor: Henrik Reuterdahl
- Previous posts: Bishop of Strängnäs (1839–1852)

Orders
- Consecration: 19 May 1839 by Johan Olof Wallin
- Rank: Metropolitan Archbishop

Personal details
- Born: 15 October 1784 Ösmo, Sweden
- Died: 27 August 1855 (aged 70) Uppsala, Sweden
- Parents: Rev. Stefan Holmström; Engel Risberg
- Spouse: Sofia Magdalena Göthberg (1st marriage); Kristina Katarina Eckhoff (2nd marriage)

Hans Olof Holmström (15 October 1784 - 27 August 1855) was a Swedish bishop within the Church of Sweden. He was the archbishop of Uppsala between 1852 and 1855.

== Biography ==
He was born in the parish of Ösmo, Sweden, the son of Stefan Holmström and Engel Risberg. Holmström had received a master's degree at Uppsala University in 1806 and three years later was appointed associate professor of Latin in 1811 and in 1816 became an associate professor of the Faculty of Philosophy. He was appointed vicar of Dunker-Lilla Malma parish in 1828. He was appointed bishop of the Diocese of Strängnäs in 1839 and held this office until 1852, when he was called to serve as archbishop of Uppsala and vice chancellor of the University of Uppsala.
