= Carl Block =

Swedish Bishop (1874-1948)

The Right Reverend Carl Block
- Bishop of Gothenburg
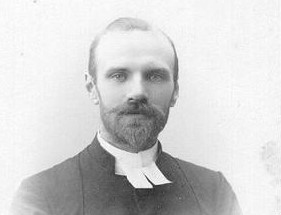
- Church: Church of Sweden
- Diocese: Gothenburg
- Elected: 1929
- In office: 1929–1948
- Predecessor: Edvard Herman Rodhe
- Successor: Bo Giertz

Orders
- Consecration: 5 May 1929 by Nathan Söderblom

Personal details
- Born: 12 February 1874 Öxnevalla, Älvsborgs län, Sweden
- Died: 6 October 1948 (aged 74) Gothenburg, Sweden
- Buried: Örgryte Ol Cemetery
- Denomination: Lutheran
- Parents: Anders Herder Block and Charlotta Elisabet Cullberg
- Spouse: Elisabet Bolin
- Children: 5

Carl Elis Daniel Block (12 February 1874 – 6 October 1948) was Bishop of Gothenburg from 1929 until 1948. He was the half-brother of the mathematician Henrik Block and father of the doctor Erik Block and educator Bertil Block. He was a cousin of John Cullberg.

== Biography ==
Block was born in Öxnevalla in Älvsborg County, Sweden to Anders Herder Block, a contractor in Örby, and Charlotta Elisabet Cullberg. Block graduated from the Gothenburg Higher Latin Language School on 3 June 1891, after which he studied in Lund in the fall of 1891, becoming a candidate of philosophy on 31 January 1895. He did his theoretical exam and practical theological exam on 14 December 1897 and a dissertation trial on 8 September 1910, where he introduced The judgment chapter in his dissertation titled "Kristologien i Hegelsk bearbetning (The Hologram of Hegelian Processing)". He became a doctor of theology on 31 May 1935, and was elected on 11 January 1898. Carl Block became a church councilor in Borås on 3 January 1906. He was also appointed as pastor in Mölndal on 10 July 1915, serving as extraordinary chief predictor between 1919 and 1938. He was elected bishop of Gothenburg on 25 February 1929.

He became a bishop in Gothenburg on 25 February 1929. He remained bishop until his death in Gothenburg on 6 October 1948. Block married Elisabet Bolin (1878-1976) on 4 September 1906. They had 5 children: Kerstin (1907-1908), Märta (born 1908), Erik (born 1910), Bertil (born 1912) and Anna-Lisa (born 1915).
