= Gedda =

Swedish noble family

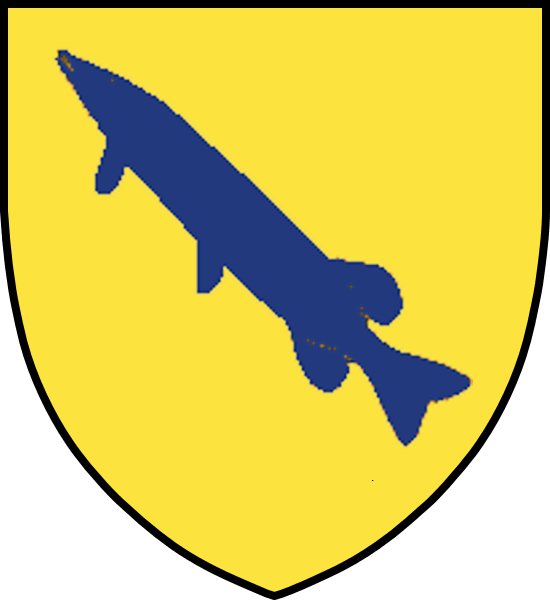
- Coat of arms of the Gedda family
- Parent house: Possibly Gädda
- Current region: Sweden
- Earlier spellings: Giedde
- Origin: Baahuslen, Norway (while by tradition Trondheim, Norway)
- Founder: Gude Axelsen Giedde (1510–1590)
- Distinctions: 1797: Georg Gedda was ennobled (n. 2168) by King Gustav IV Adolf of Sweden

Gedda is a Swedish noble family with Gude Axelsen Giedde (1510–1590) as earliest attested primogenitor. Georg Gedda was ennobled (n. 2168) by King Gustav IV Adolf of Sweden in 1797.

Speculations of whether Gude Axelsen Giedde was the great-grandson of Erengisle Gädda of the Swedish noble Gädda family from Småland remain unattested. In any case, he became the asserted primogenitor of the Gedda family ennobled in 1791.

== Bibliography ==
- Gedda, Torsten: Släkten Gedda från Bohuslän, Strokirks Bokindustri, Skövde (1953)
