= Horace Marryat =

English author

Horace Marryat (1818–1887) was an English traveller, and author.

Horace Marryat was a son of the businessman Joseph Marryat (1757–1824). His father maintained extended holdings in the West Indies, and made a fortune from colonial goods.

After his father died, being the youngest of the children in the family, he left England in the 1840s, setting out on his many travels.

With his wife Mathilda Elisabeth Somerset, daughter of Lord Edward Somerset, Marryat spent time in France, Italy, and Denmark. In 1860, he published A Residence in Jutland, the Danish Isles and Copenhagen. He went on travelling in Sweden, notably spending time at the manse of Johan Börjesson, preparing his subsequent travelogue. In 1862, he published One Year in Sweden (published 1862; Swedish translation 1863), based in his impressions and findings while staying with the family.

In 1863, Marryat's daughter Ida married the Swedish Count Gustaf Fredrik Bonde, after which Horace Marryat and his wife would spend their summers at Hörningsholm Castle in Södermanland.

One of his elder brothers was the renowned novelist, Frederick Marryat.
