= Henrik Reuterdahl =

Swedish Lutheran clergyman

The Most Reverend Henrik Reuterdahl
- Archbishop of Uppsala; Primate of Sweden
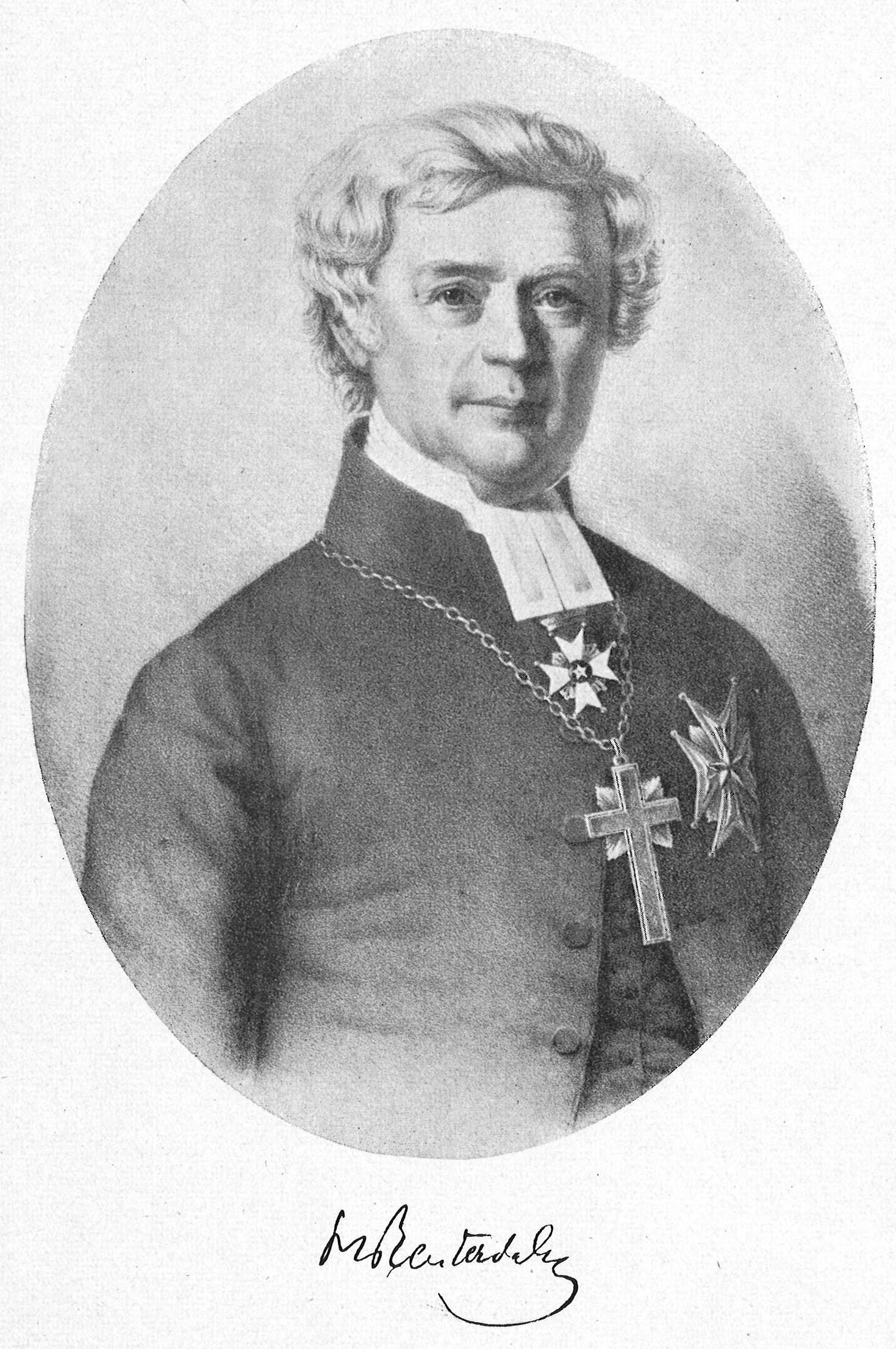
- Church: Church of Sweden
- Archdiocese: Uppsala
- Appointed: 1856
- In office: 1856–1870
- Predecessor: Hans Olof Holmström
- Successor: Anton Niklas Sundberg
- Previous post: Bishop of Lund (1855-1856)

Orders
- Consecration: 20 May 1855 by Hans Olof Holmström

Personal details
- Born: 11 September 1795 Malmö, Sweden
- Died: 28 June 1870 (aged 74) Uppsala, Sweden
- Buried: Uppsala gamla kyrkogård
- Parents: Bengt Fredrik Reuterdahl; Anna Christina Askerlund

Henrik Reuterdahl (11 September 1795 in Malmö – 28 June 1870 in Uppsala) was a Swedish Lutheran clergyman who served as the Church of Sweden archbishop of Uppsala from 1856 to his death.

== Biography ==
Born in Malmö, he was orphaned at an early age and had to rely on others for his education and support. Despite this he managed to get a higher education at the Lund University in theology, philology and Church history, influenced by local academic dignities such as Erik Gustaf Geijer as well as the works of the German Schleiermacher that had just become appreciated in Lund. He later published a thorough history of the Church in Sweden (4 volumes, 1838–1866).

Reuterdahl served as an associate professor at the theological seminary until 1826 and in 1844, he became a professor of dogma. Reuterdahl was a member of the Royal Swedish Academy of Sciences from 1848 and of the Swedish Academy from 1852.

Religious titles
Preceded by Hans Olov Holmström	Archbishop of Uppsala; 1856–1870	Succeeded by Anton Niklas Sundberg
Cultural offices
Preceded by Carl Fredrik af Wingård	Swedish Academy, Seat No.10; 1852-1870	Succeeded by Paul Genberg
