= Gude Axelsen Giedde =

Norwegian military officer and clergy (1510–1590)

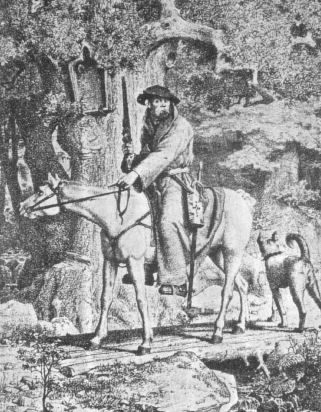
Gude Axelsen Giedde, armed during the Protestant Reformation, depicted in cliché verre by Georg von Rosen (1843–1923).

Gude Axelsen Giedde (Swedish: Gude Axelsson Gedda) (1510-1590) was a Norwegian military officer, Lutheran prelate, and provost in Kville, Bohuslän, then part of Norway.

== Biography ==
Gude Axelsen Giedde was born in 1510 in Trondheim, Norway, as a son of Axel Giedde and Margareta Pedersdotter. His father, who was a lieutenant in Trondheim, is said to have lost his nobility due to marriage with a commoner, a daughter of a merchant.

Gude married Johanna Pedersdotter, with whom he had at least three sons.

It has been speculated that he was the great-grandson of sv:Erengisle Gädda of the Swedish noble family Gädda from Småland, Sweden, but this remains unattested. In any case, his family descendants were ennobled in the name of Gedda (n:o 2168) by King Gustav IV Adolf of Sweden in 1797; he became the asserted primogenitor of this family.

In his youth he studied at the University of Wittenberg in Wittenberg, Holy Roman Empire, and became a follower and friend of Martin Luther with whom he often corresponded. When Giedde returned to Norway he became an officer.

As a devoted adherent of Lutheranism, for his personal security during the tumultuous time of the Protestant Reformation, he is said to ridden his horse equipped with a sword and pistols. His sword was inherited down to his grandson Peder Jenssen, who however lost it in a fire.

The Danish-Norwegian King Christian III was concerned about imposing the Protestant Reformation in his dominions and therefore needed clergy profoundly introduced in the Lutheran teachings. Giedde thus left his military career in order to become a priest.

In 1534 he was appointed vicar in Kville, Bohuslen, then belonging to Norway, becoming the region's first Lutheran priest, succeeding the Catholic monk Gudmund. When Pehr Kalm visited Fjällbacka in 1742, he was told the story about how Gudmund went under and died due to the "Gudmund skerry" in the sea outside the port of Fjällbacka.

Giedde remained vicar there until 1573, when he was appointed religious provost in Viken.

Due to his old age he had become blind when he was visited in Kville by King James VI of Scotland. He died in 1590 in Kville, in today's Tanum Municipality, Bohuslän, Sweden.
