= Diocese of Gothenburg =

Diocese within the Church of Sweden

Diocese of Gothenburg Diocesis Gothoburgensis Göteborgs stift
- Arms of the diocese of Gothenburg

- Flag

Location
- Country: Sweden
- Deaneries: 16 kontrakt
- Coordinates: 57°42′16″N 11°57′55″E

Statistics
- Parishes: 124
- Congregations: 196

Information
- Denomination: Church of Sweden
- Established: 1620
- Cathedral: Gothenburg Cathedral

Current leadership
- Bishop: Susanne Rappmann
- Metropolitan Archbishop: Antje Jackelén

Map

Website
- svenskakyrkan.se/goteborgsstift

The Diocese of Gothenburg (Swedish: Göteborgs stift) is a diocese of the Church of Sweden. Since March 2018, the bishop has been Susanne Rappmann. The diocese includes the provinces of Bohuslän, Halland, and south-west parts of Västergötland. The episcopal see of the diocese is in Gothenburg Cathedral.

== List of superintendents of Gothenburg ==
- Sylvester Johannis Phrygius (1620-1628)
- Andreas Johannis Prytz (1629–1647)
- Ericus Brunnius (1647–1664)

== List of bishops of Gothenburg ==
- Zacharias Klingius (1665–1671)
- Laurentius Thoreri Billichius (1671–1678)
- Daniel Larsson Wallerius (1678–1689)
- Johan Carlberg (1689–1701)
- Georg Wallin the elder (1701–1702)
- Laurentius Norrmannus (1702–1703)
- Olaus Nezelius (1703–1710)
- Johan Poppelman (1711–1725)
- Erik Benzelius the younger (1726–1731)
- Jacob Benzelius (1731–1744)
- Georg Wallin the younger (1745–1760)
- Erik Lamberg (1760–1780)
- Johan Wingård (1781–1819)
- Carl Fredrik af Wingård (1818–1839)
- Anders Bruhn (1840–1856)
- Gustaf Daniel Björck (1856–1888)
- Edvard Herman Rodhe (1888–1929)
- Carl Block (1929–1948)
- Bo Giertz (1949–1970)
- Bertil Gärtner (1970–1991)
- Lars Eckerdal (1991–2003)
- Carl Axel Aurelius (2003–2011)
- Per Eckerdal (2011–2018)
- Susanne Rappmann (2018–present)
