= Per Eckerdal =

Bishop of Gothenburg, Sweden

The Right Reverend Per Eckerdal
- Bishop Emeritus of Gothenburg
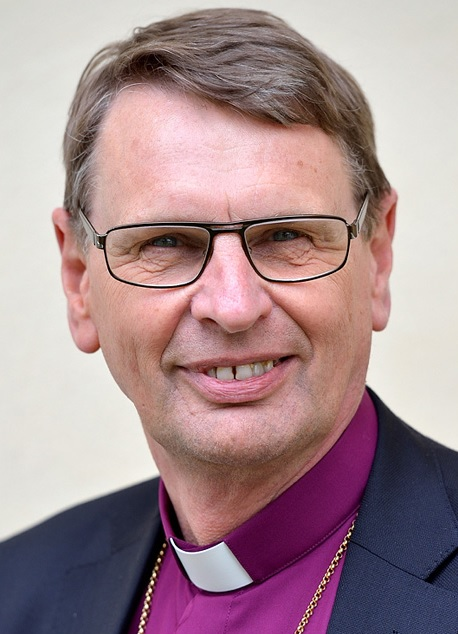
- Church: Church of Sweden
- Diocese: Gothenburg
- Elected: 2011
- In office: 2011–2018
- Predecessor: Carl Axel Aurelius
- Successor: Susanne Rappmann

Orders
- Ordination: 1975
- Consecration: 4 September 2011

Personal details
- Born: March 31, 1951 (age 75) Östad, Sweden
- Denomination: Lutheran
- Parents: Hugo Eckerdal and Vera Andersson
- Spouse: Lena Harrysson (1973-2000); Monica Eckerdal (2000-present)
- Children: 4
- Motto: Mitt ibland er
- Coat of arms

Per Eckerdal (born March 31, 1951, in Östad in Västergötland), is a Swedish theologian and former bishop of Gothenburg.

== Biography ==
Per Eckerdal is the son of Hugo Eckerdal (1907–1987), curator in the Västra Frölunda parish in Gothenburg, and his wife Vera, born Andersson (1912–2007). He is the brother of the emeritus Bishop of Gothenburg, Lars Eckerdal. From his first marriage (1973–2000) with Lena Eckerdal, born Harrysson, he has four children. Since 2000, he has been married to Monica Eckerdal, the national coordinator of the apostate priest and granddaughter of Archbishop Bertil Werkström.

Per Eckerdal was ordained priest in 1975 and was appointed to Kortedala Parish in Gothenburg from 1975–1977, diocesan assistant professor 1977–1982, as well as curate in Älvsåkers Assembly (Tölö parish) in Halland 1982–1990. He was director of Bräcke diakoni between 1990–2008 and as working chairman of the board 2008–2011. In 2011 he was elected bishop of Gothenburg and became the 23rd bishop.

In the election for the Archbishopric of Uppsala in 2013, Per Eckerdal came in fifth place with three percent of the votes and thus became one of the candidates in the election itself. In 2018, Eckerdal retired as bishop of Gothenburg and was succeeded by Susanne Rappmann.
