= Af Darelli =

Swedish noble family

Af Darelli was a Swedish noble family ennobled (1770) through the physician and assessor Johan Anders Darelius (1718–1780).
