= Carl Fredrik af Wingård =

Swedish Lutheran archbishop (1781–1851)

The Most Reverend Carl Fredrik af Wingård RoKKMO, KNO
- Archbishop of Uppsala; Primate of Sweden
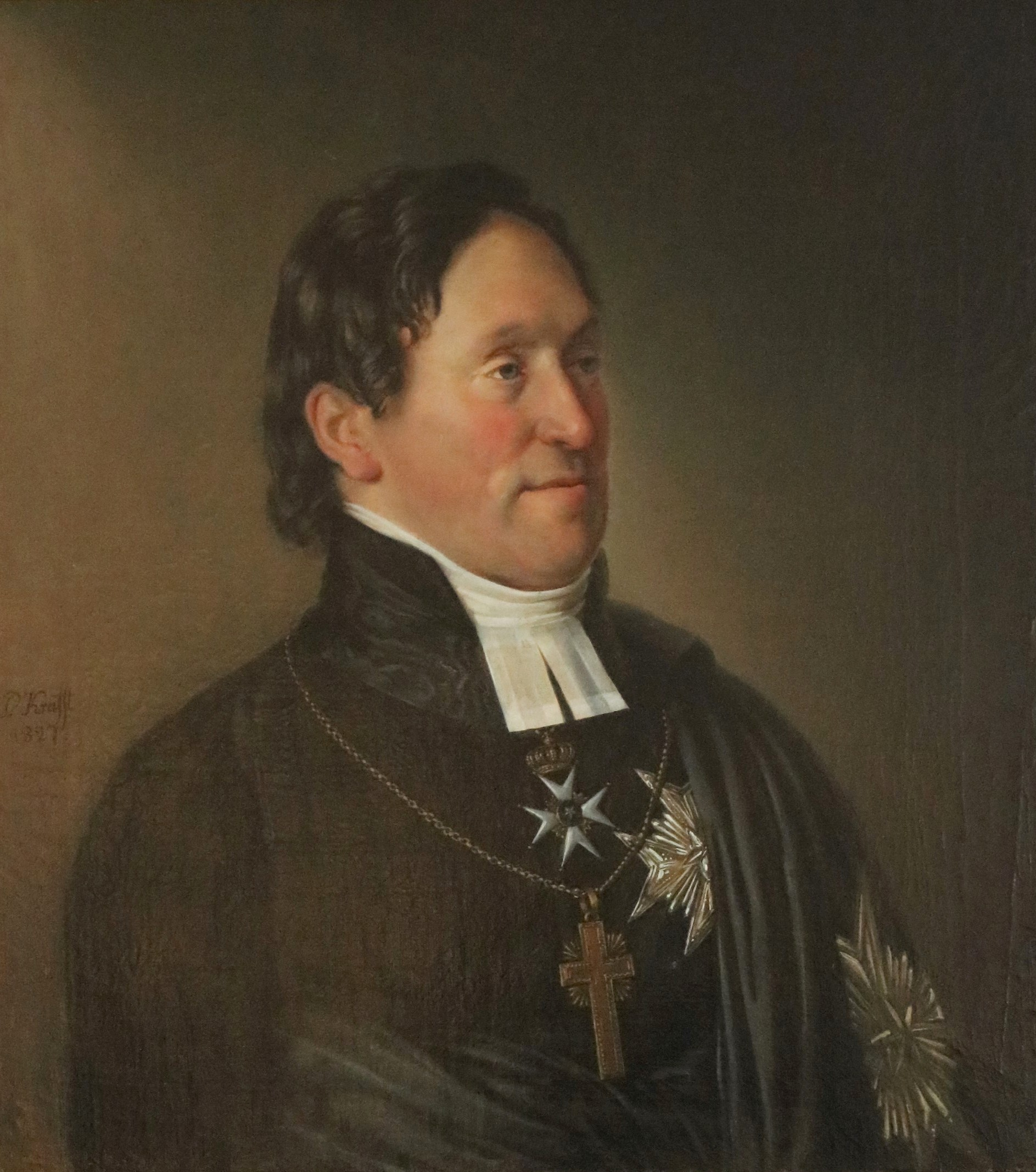
- Carl Fredrik af Wingård as Archbishop of the Church of Sweden
- Church: Church of Sweden
- Archdiocese: Uppsala
- Appointed: 1839
- In office: 1839–1851
- Predecessor: Johan Olof Wallin
- Successor: Hans Olof Holmström
- Previous post: Bishop of Gothenburg (1818–1839)

Orders
- Ordination: 18 November 1817
- Consecration: 8 July 1818 by Jacob Axelsson Lindblom

Personal details
- Born: 26 September 1781 Stockholm, Sweden
- Died: 19 September 1851 (aged 69) Sunnersta, Sweden
- Parents: Johan Wingård; Fredrika af Darelli
- Spouse: Anna Fredrika Åkerman (1807–1851)
- Education: Uppsala University

Carl Fredrik af Wingård (born 26 September 1781 in Stockholm, died 19 September 1851) was a Swedish Lutheran archbishop of the Church of Sweden, a professor at Uppsala University, and a politician. He served as Archbishop of Uppsala 1839–1851. He was also holder of seat 10 in the Swedish Academy.

== Biography ==
His noble title (af) was added to his family name Wingård already in 1799, as he was the son of a bishop, Johan Wingård, who became his predecessor in the Diocese of Gothenburg. He was a cousin to the poet Johan Börjesson.

Af Wingård studied at the Uppsala University and eventually became professor there in 1810. In 1818 he was ordained priest and 8 July 1818 he became bishop of Gothenburg.

From all reports, af Wingård seems to have been a humanistic teacher and professor, gentle and caring, especially towards students.

Af Wingård was active against alcoholism among priests, and was one of the founders of the Temperance Society (Nykterhetssällskapet) of Gothenburg, established in 1830. He also founded the Swedish Mission Society (Svenska Missionssällskapet) in 1835, an organization for mission work among the Sámi people, together with Methodist missionary George Scott, industrialist Samuel Owen, priest Johan Olof Wallin, Count Mathias Rosenblad, and others. He served as president of Pro Fide et Christianismo, a Christian education society.

He was elected a member of the Royal Swedish Academy of Sciences in 1838.

== Distinctions ==
- (Sweden) Order of the Seraphim
- (Sweden) Commander of the Order of the Polar Star

== Sources ==
- Nordisk familjebok, article Wingård In Swedish

Religious titles
Preceded by Johan Olof Wallin	Archbishop of Uppsala; 1839–1851	Succeeded by Hans Olof Holmström
Cultural offices
Preceded by Gustaf Lagerbielke	Swedish Academy, Seat No.10; 1837-1851	Succeeded by Henrik Reuterdahl
