= Agnes Börjesson =

Swedish artist (1827–1900)

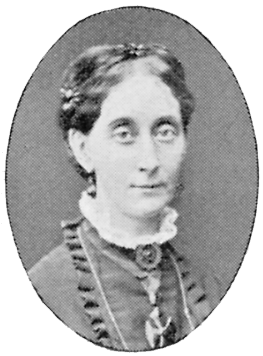
Agnes Börjesson, from the Svenskt Porträttgalleri XX

Agnes Fredrika Börjesson, sometimes called Agneta (1 May 1827, Uppsala – 26 January 1900, Alassio, Italy), was a Swedish painter who specialized in genre and historical scenes.

== Biography ==
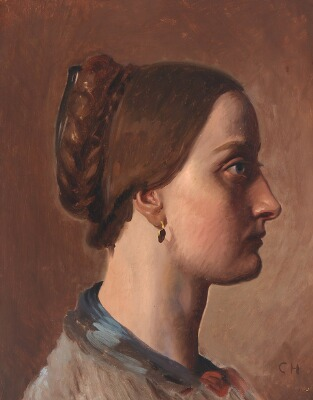
Börjesson, painted by Constantin Hansen

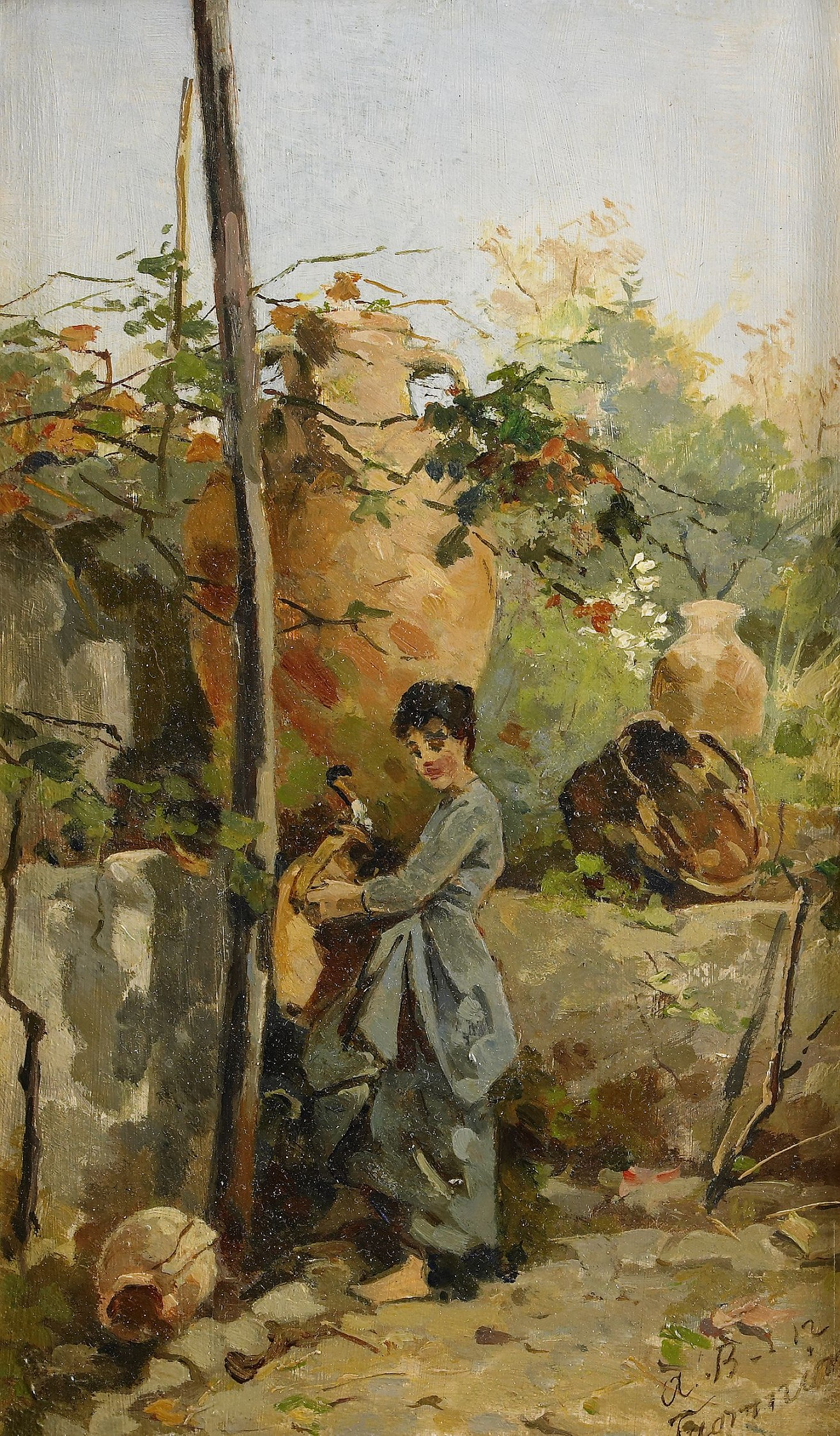
Italian Woman at the Well (Taormina)

Her father, Johan Börjesson, was a pastor and playwright. Her mother was a member of the noble Fock family. In 1849, she became one of the first four women admitted to the Royal Swedish Academy of Fine Arts and, from 1852 to 1853, studied with Constantin Hansen, who had recently spent a decade working in Italy.

From 1854 to 1856, she studied with the portrait and history painter, Johan Christoffer Boklund. In 1857, she completed her studies with Benjamin Vautier, an exponent of the Düsseldorf School. After spending some time in Paris, she went to Italy in 1865, inspired by her time with Hansen. She returned to Düsseldorf, briefly, for some private lessons with Wilhelm Sohn.

She settled in Rome, and for a time lived with her friend, the painter Sofie Ribbing. Eventually she decided to stay in Italy, although she continued to send her works to Sweden, and, until 1880, participated in exhibitions at the Royal Academy, of which she became a member in 1872. She also had a showing at the 1873 Vienna World's Fair.

Many of her paintings were created en plein aire. In the latter part of her career, she adopted the Divisionist style. She spent long periods in Venice and on Sicily, as well as making short visits to Spain and Morocco. During her last three years, she lived in Liguria.

Her works may be seen at the Göteborgs konstmuseum and the Nationalmuseum.

== Sources ==
- Carin Österberg, et al., Svenska kvinnor: föregångare, nyskapare. Lund: Signum 1990 ISBN 91-87896-03-6
- Svenskt konstnärslexikon Part I, pg. 264, Allhems Förlag, Malmö
- Flensburg, Birgitta. Agneta Fredrika (Agnes) Börjesson at Svenskt kvinnobiografiskt lexikon
