= Fock family =

Swedish noble family

Fock is a Swedish noble family (the Focks) originally from Westphalia, Holy Roman Empire, from where members relocated to the Baltics. In 1651 four brothers were naturalised as Swedish nobility, from which three freiherr (baron) cadet branches were issued.

== See also ==
- Fox
