= Benzelius family =

Benzelius is the surname of a Swedish family of pastors and theologians, which originated in Bensbyn in the municipality of Luleå, from which the surname was formed in Latin.

The founders of the Benzelius family were Henrik Jacobsson, farmer and juror, and his wife Margareta Jönsdotter. Henrik Jacobsson was from, according to contemporary records, in Kalix, and the wife from Luleå. Henrik Jacobsson was born on the island of Hindersön in the archipelago of Luleå, where he was until 1629 a farmer before he moved to Bensbyn, through either marriage or inheritance. His father Jacob Henriksson died early. His widow Barbro Eriksdotter later married a farmer from Nederkalix but her son Olof Persson was the product of her third marriage. Henrik Jacobsson's paternal grandfather of the same name was the landköpman [ "country merchant" ] and farmer at the farm in Hindersön, and his great-grandfather Jakob Jönsson had also been a farmer at the same farm. Margareta Jönsdotter was probably the one that had the right of inheritance of the estate in Bensbyn, and she was in that case the daughter of the farmer Jöns Larsson, who was a member of the Birkarls, a Finnish group that controlled commerce and taxes.

Henrik Jacobsson and Margareta Jönsdotter had several children. Their son Jacob became an indelta soldater [ "tenement soldier" ] for his father and got his own farm. The couple also had at least two daughters, daughter Anna, who with her husband took over the farm in Bensbyn, and Mariet or Margareta who married a knekt [ "foot soldier" ] in Luleå. Margaret was called Benzelia in the records of the town hall of Luleå. A possible third sister married in Uppsala the alderman Peder Pedersson, who was said to be Margaret Benzelias's son-in-law .

The second son of Henrik Jacobsson and Margareta Jönsdotter was Erik who adopted the name of Benzelius. He was raised by his wealthy and childless half - uncle Olof Persson in Uppsala, cited above, and adopted the Latin name Benzelius in honor of his birthplace when he enrolled at Uppsala University. Erik Benzelius later became the 46th Archbishop of Uppsala. He married Margareta Odhelia, the daughter of Professor Erik Odhelius ( 1620–1666 ) and Margaretha Kenicia, the granddaughter of the 40th Archbishop of Uppsala Petrus Kenicius ( 1555–1636 ) from the Bure dynasty and, according to Gabriel Anrep, through the Archbishop's father, the descendant of the old nobility of Västergötland. The couple had ten children. Three sons became the 50th, 51st and 52nd Archbishops of Uppsala, namely Erik Benzelius the Younger ( 1743–1744 ), Jakob Benzelius ( 1744–1747 ), and Henrik Benzelius ( 1747–1758 ).

The children who had not entered the Church were ennobled as knights with the name of Benzelstierna. The other sons and their descendants continued to use the name of Benzelius. Erik Benzelius the younger was, through his marriage with Bishop Jesper Svedberg's daughter Anna Swedenborg, the brother-in-law of Emanuel Swedenborg. Their son Carl Jesper Benzelius became the Bishop of Strängnäs, the daughter Ulrika married the 22nd Lutheran Bishop of Linköping, Petrus Filenius ( 1704–1780 ), and all of their sons took the name of Benzelstierna in Riddarhuset [ "House of Nobility" ]. Jakob Benzelius was, with his marriage with Katarina Edenberg, the father of Margareta Benzelstjerna, the ancestress of the noble family of von Engeström, and of the Secretary of State Mathias Benzelstierna ( 1713–1791 ). Henrik Benzelius married Emerentia Rudenschöld, daughter of Torsten Rudeen ( 1661–1729 ), the 18th Lutheran Bishop of Linköping.

Of the daughters of Erik Benzelius the elder, Margaret married professor Olaus Nezelius ( 1638–1710 ), the Bishop of Gothenburg, and Kristina became the ancestress of the noble family of Bergenskjöld.

== Notable Members ==
- Erik Benzelius the Elder
- Erik Benzelius the Younger
- Jakob Benzelius
- Henrik Benzelius
- Carl Jesper Benzelius
- Mathias Benzelstierna
- Olaus Nezelius, the son-in-law of Erik Benzelius the Elder
- Emanuel Swedenborg, the brother-in-law of Erik Benzelius the Younger
- Petrus Filenius, the son-in-law of Erik Benzelius the Younger

== Bibliography ==
- (in Swedish) Svenskt biografiskt lexikon [ Swedish Biographical Dictionary ]
- (in Swedish) [Johan] Gabriel Anrep, "Adel ätten [ Noble family of ] Benzelstjerna, N:o 1628, B.", Svenska adelns Ättar-taflor [ Pedigree Tables of the Swedish Nobility ], Volume 1 (Stockholm: P. A. Norstedt & Söner, 1858), pages 148-152
- (in Swedish) Leif Boström, "Några bensbysläkter [ A Few Families of Bensbyn ]", Lulebygdens forskareförenings medlemstidning [ Magazine of the Lulebygden Association of Scholars ], Issue No. 68, November 2009
- (in Swedish) Björn Ryman, "Släkten Benzelius [ Benzalius Family ]". In: Harry Lenhammar, editor, Sveriges kyrkohistoria, Band 5: Individualismens och upplysningens tid [ Church History of Sweden, Volume 5: Individualism and Enlightenment ] (Stockholm: Verbum, 2000), ISBN 978-91-526246-0-9, pages 264-271
- (in Swedish) Bo Johnson Theutenberg, "Mellan liljan och sjöbladet" [ Between the Lily and the Lotus ], Part 1:1 (Skara: Skara stiftshistoriska sällskap [ Historical Society of the Diocese of Skara ], 2008), ISBN 978-91-977365-2-7, pages 232-234
