= Liturgical struggle =

Religious conflict in Sweden

The Liturgical Struggle (Swedish: Liturgiska striden) was the name for the period from 1574 until 1593 in Sweden, when there was a struggle about the confession of faith and liturgy of the Church of Sweden, brought about by the attempts of King John III of Sweden to make the Swedish church take a mediating position between Catholicism and Protestantism by holding only certain doctrines and practices which could be established immediately in either the Word of God or patristic writings, similar to what had once been imposed on the Lutheran areas in Germany during the Augsburg Interim. The struggle began in 1574, when the king introduced some new rules in the liturgy which were not by Lutheran doctrine and practice, followed by his publication of the Liturgia Svecanae Ecclesiae catholicae & orthodoxae conformia commonly called the "Red Book", which re-introduced a number of Catholic customs. The Liturgical Struggle ended with the Lutheran confession of faith at the Uppsala Synod in 1593.

== Background ==
A similar idea had already appeared abroad and had its most prominent advocate in the Dutch theologian George Cassander (d. 1566). John III had, through his theological studies during his incarceration at Gripsholm (1563–1567), become acquainted with the same line of thinking, and in his secretary Petrus Fecht he had a good assistant in the endeavor to restore "the apostolic and Catholic faith of the early church."

It began with the fact that, at a Riksdag in 1574, despite objections, the king established a number of minor rules of conduct concerning the service. In 1575 he got the church's chief men to adopt the "new ordinance" (Nova Ordinantia), which in several points contradicted pure Lutheranism. The theologians from Uppsala were given a special statement on this ordinance: they considered that it contained the Church's approved doctrine, "only the right was understood," and that the ceremonies prescribed therein could well be accepted, "unless it aroused opposition." The same year, the Charter was also conditionally approved by the priests who met and the bishops of Linköping and Västerås were consecrated to their offices.

In 1576 the schism broke out completely, since the King had in the beginning of the same year, printed and distributed a new worship order, It was called the Liturgia Suecanæ Ecclesiæ catholicæ & orthodoxæ conformis. Because of the color of the printed copies, it was called the Red Book. He had written it together with Fecht. (The book's title and enterprise, as well as the regulations for the priest, annotations and notes were written in Latin, but the liturgy itself was written in both Latin and Swedish.) This order of service was different from the other, less ceremonial Swedish order already in use and adopted some of the content of the Tridentine Mass, including the use of the sign of the cross. However certain aspects which were considered offensive to Protestant eyes were removed. The struggle was mainly conducted over this order of service; hence even the very name of the struggle. The struggle was especially significant from 1576–1580 due to John III's negotiations on how to approach the Roman Catholic Church.

== Resistance ==
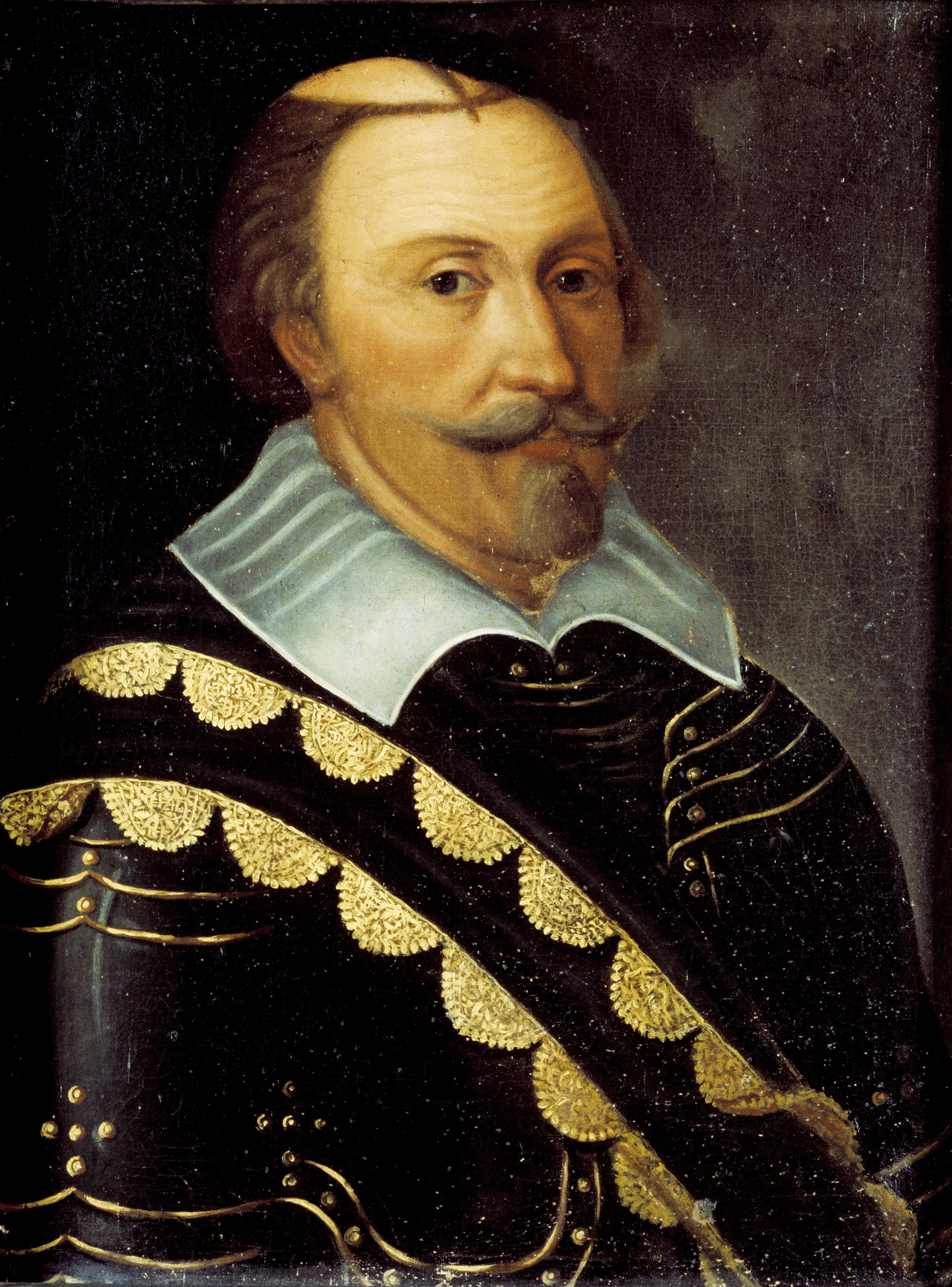
Duke Karl, later Karl IX, pictured by unknown contemporary artist.

The first resistance to "new ordinance" and the liturgy came from the brother of Duke Charles IX. He stated from the outset that he was determined to maintain the church use introduced during Gustav Vasa's time. Later, in September 1576, the Duchy's residents also declared themselves wanting to stick to the old Lutheran liturgy. At the same time, anxiety began to be felt in the capital. Stockholm's vicar, Olaus Petri Medelpadius, the principal of the city's school, Abrahamus Andreae Angermannus, and two chaplains were required to observe the new order on September 7. When they not only failed to do so, but also gave a written objection to the liturgy, Olaus Petri was transferred to a position as preacher in Uppsala and Abrahamus as preacher in Öregrund, both under the archbishop's special supervision. Chaplain Peter Eriksson fled to Duke Charles for protection, but the other chaplain had to stay in Stockholm because of his old age.

== The battle hardens ==
At Christmas 1576, the battle flared up in Uppsala, where Archbishop Laurentius banned the new preacher and professor Petrus Jonae (who was known for his fiery sermons) to practice the priesthood. In January 1577, Peter Jonae and his brother Olaus Luth were called by the king to Stockholm. Religious talks took place, with the Jesuit Laurentius Norvegus ("Klosterlasse") arguing the case for the new liturgy. But the two maintained their protests, and the judge in Västerås, Salomon Birgeri, was led to support the liturgy. He was appointed to serve in Stockholm and joined the resistance. However, the king was negotiating in the villages about the liturgy's recognition.

When a parliament was announced in Stockholm to discuss the issue, the Uppsala professors were taken away in custody to Svartsjö. Salomo Birgeri, Olaus Petri, and Abrahamus Angermannus, (who later turned out to be indifferent) were sent to the farm in Häringe, Södertörn. At the meeting of the stations, the worldly positions immediately left their approval for the new order of service on February 11. The clergy, on the other hand, signed their consent only five days later, after a persistent resistance by the Linköping bishop Martinus Olai Gestricius. He assented, but included a reference to a declaration demanded by the conflict over the disputed book. Afterwards, the prisoners were recovered, but could not now be induced to remission. The two professors then had to return to Uppsala; Abrahamus Angermannus was sent as a vicar to Saltvik in Åland, and Olaus Petri had to settle on a farm in Roslagen. Salomo Birgeri was still held for some time longer, but then returned to his position in Västerås.

Despite the enforced decision, however, no significant enthusiasm for the actual introduction of the liturgy was noticed in Västergötland. Additionally, the new order of service came into question in Bishop Martin's Linköping's diocese of and in Strängnäs diocese, where Duke Karl's will was decisive. The fact that the Jesuits arrived in Sweden and publicly supported the liturgy led many who were previously supportive to oppose the new program. It seemed ominous, and even Archbishop Laurentius Petri (died February 12, 1579) turned during his last year of life against the new order of service.

== The fight continues ==
Since the last hope of an agreement with the pope was lost by 1580, King John became more violent in the attempt to enforce his will, while again Duke Karl began to openly defy it. The king commanded his bailiffs to withhold the income of the priests who refused to follow the new liturgy. Bishop Martinus in Linköping was dismissed, but he was appointed vicar in Nyköping by Duke Karl, who at the same time also appointed the deposed clergyman in Vadstena. Jesper Marci he appointed as superintendent over Värmland, Vadsbo, and Valla. Petrus Jonae was thrown into prison in 1581 and Abraham Angermannus, who for some time had already been held prisoner at Turku Castle, again was threatened by imprisonment, but both managed to escape to the Duke. In the Riksdag in Stockholm in 1582, the priests pleased John III by upholding the new order of service and declared their voluntary consent to the liturgy's introduction into all the parishes of the kingdom. In 1583, all the bishops of the kingdom, except the one in Strängnäs, gathered at Archbishop Andreas Laurentii Björnram's ordinance and then committed themselves to the complete implementation of the new order of service.

== The end of the battle ==
Duke Karl, after Martinus Olai died in 1585, chose Petrus Jonæ Helsingus (1586) to be bishop of Strängnäs diocese. In May of the same year, he issued the Örebro articles, in which it stressed that only the ceremonies that had been approved by the priesthood in Uppsala in 1572 would be required. At the conciliation between the king and the Duke, as confirmed in Vadstena in 1587, the religious issue was referred to a prospective church meeting; But already in that year, Karl Strängnäs diocese's clergy declared the new liturgy both unnecessary and harmful. This declaration was assisted by the other clergy in the Duchy. With the help of Abrahamus Angermannus, the Duke's rejection proved stronger than the king's beloved works from four German theological faculties.

John raged and issued a proclamation in an open-ended, hostile letter directed at the Duchy's priesthood in 1588. The King also succeeded in persuading the priests in some other parts of the country to denounce all fellowship with the Duchy's bishopric; but on the other hand reminders of the intended church meeting were made from several quarters, and the Council also requested in 1589 that such a meeting be convened. In the same year, the three teachers at the dormitory in Stockholm were arrested by Ericus Jacobi Skinnerus: Nicolaus Olai Bothniensis, Petrus Kenicius, Ericus Olai Schepperus, and others. But during the illness that preceded the king's death in 1592, his mind was alleviated, and when the clergy asked for liberty from following the new liturgy for the Duke's diocese, John III did not want to be dominate over them. In 1593 the whole battle ended during the Uppsala Synod, where the Lutheran confession of faith was adopted and the red book was rejected with the confirmation of the Church Order of 1571.

The Church of Sweden was not like the Church of England where the monarch was superior. Rather, the decision of the synod of bishops had to be respected by any new king as a prerequisite to coronation.

== See also ==
- 1576 Plot
