= Benzelius =

Benzelius is a surname. Notable people with the surname include:

- Erik Benzelius the Elder, Swedish theologian and bishop
- Erik Benzelius the Younger
- Henric Benzelius (1689–1758), Swedish bishop
- Jacob Benzelius (1683–1747), Swedish bishop
