= List of archbishops of Uppsala =

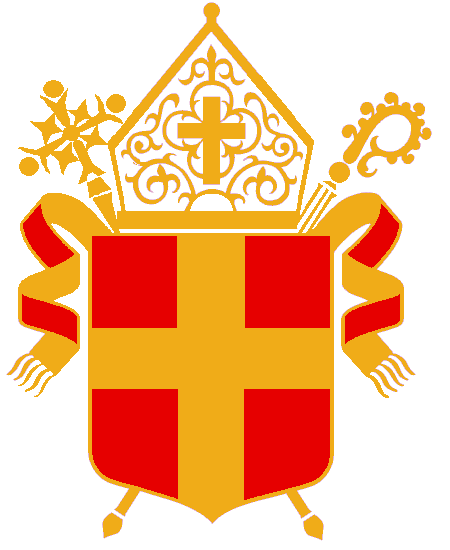
Coat of arms of the Archbishop of Uppsala.

This article lists the archbishops of Uppsala.

== Before the Reformation ==
- 1164–1185: Stefan
- 1185–1187: Johannes
- 1187–1197: Petrus
- 1198–1206: Olov Lambatunga
- 1207–1219: Valerius
- 1219 (1224)–1234: Olov Basatömer
- 1236–1255: Jarler
- 1255–1267: Lars
- 1274–1277: Folke Johansson Ängel
- 1278–1281: Jakob Israelsson
- 1281–1284: Johan Odulfsson (not ordained)
- 1285–1289: Magnus Bosson
- 1289–1291: Johan
- 1292–1305: Nils Allesson
- 1308–1314: Nils Kettilsson
- 1315–1332: Olov Björnsson
- 1332–1341: Petrus Filipsson
- 1341–1351: Heming Nilsson
- 1351–1366: Petrus Torkilsson
- 1366–1383: Birger Gregersson
- 1383–1408: Henrik Karlsson
- 1408–1421: Jöns Gerekesson (Johannes Gerechini)
- 1421–1432: Johan Håkansson
- 1432–1438: Olov Larsson (Olaus Laurentii)
- 1433–1434: Arnold of Bergen (not ordained)
- 1438–1448: Nicolaus Ragvaldi
- 1448–1467: Jöns Bengtsson Oxenstierna
- 1468–1469: Tord Pedersson (Bonde) (not ordained)
- 1469–1515: Jakob Ulvsson
- 1515–1517: Gustav Trolle
- 1520–1521: Gustav Trolle (under Danish government)
- 1523–1544: Johannes Magnus (in exile after 1526)
- 1544–1557: Olaus Magnus (in exile)

== During and after the Reformation ==
- 1531–1573: Laurentius Petri (Nericius)
- 1575–1579: Laurentius Petri Gothus
- 1583–1591: Andreas Laurentii Björnram
- 1593–1599: Abraham Angermannus
- 1599–1600: Nicolaus Olai Bothniensis (not ordained)
- 1601–1609: Olaus Martini (Olof Mårtensson)
- 1609–1636: Petrus Kenicius
- 1637–1646: Laurentius Paulinus Gothus
- 1647–1669: Johannes Canuti Lenaeus
- 1670–1676: Lars Stigzelius
- 1677–1681: Johan Baazius the younger
- 1681–1700: Olov Svebilius (Olaus Svebilius)
- 1700–1709: Erik Benzelius the elder
- 1711–1714: Haquin Spegel
- 1714–1730: Mathias Steuchius
- 1730–1742: Johannes Steuchius (Johannes Steuch)
- 1742–1743: Erik Benzelius the younger
- 1744–1747: Jakob Benzelius
- 1747–1758: Henric Benzelius
- 1758–1764: Samuel Troilius
- 1764–1775: Magnus Beronius
- 1775–1786: Carl Fredrik Mennander
- 1786–1803: Uno von Troil
- 1805–1819: Jacob Axelsson Lindblom
- 1819–1836: Carl von Rosenstein
- 1837–1839: Johan Olof Wallin
- 1839–1851: Carl Fredrik af Wingård
- 1852–1855: Hans Olov Holmström
- 1856–1870: Henrik Reuterdahl
- 1870–1900: Anton Niklas Sundberg
- 1900–1913: Johan August Ekman
- 1914–1931: Nathan Söderblom
- 1931–1950: Erling Eidem
- 1950–1958: Yngve Brilioth
- 1958–1967: Gunnar Hultgren
- 1967–1972: Ruben Josefson
- 1972–1983: Olof Sundby
- 1983–1993: Bertil Werkström
- 1993–1997: Gunnar Weman
- 1997–2006: Karl Gustav Hammar
- 2006–2014: Anders Wejryd
- 2014–2022: Antje Jackelén
- 2022–present: Martin Modéus

== See also ==
- Archbishop of Uppsala
- Church of Sweden
