= Andreas Laurentii Björnram =

Swedish religious leader

The Most Reverend Andreas Laurentii Björnram
- Archbishop of Uppsala; Primate of Sweden
- Church: Church of Sweden
- Archdiocese: Uppsala
- Appointed: 1583
- In office: 1583–1591
- Predecessor: Laurentius Petri Gothus
- Successor: Abraham Angermannus
- Previous post: Bishop of Växjö (1576-1583)

Orders
- Consecration: 2 June 1577 by Laurentius Petri Gothus
- Rank: Metropolitan Archbishop

Personal details
- Born: 1520
- Died: 1 January 1591 (aged 70–71)
- Buried: Uppsala Cathedral

Andreas Laurentii Björnram (1520 – 1 January 1591), also known as Bothniensis, Bureus which he called himself in honor of his mother's family, was Archbishop of Uppsala in the Church of Sweden from 1583 to his death. He was born in 1520, being the last Archbishop of Uppsala to have been born before King Gustav Vasa decreed Lutheranism to be the official state religion of the Kingdom of Sweden in 1531 during the Lutheran Reformation.

Was one of the strongest supporters of King John III of Sweden's liturgy. Eventually he changed his mind, and as archbishop advocated the reading of Martin Luther's catechism.

He was married to Margareta, the daughter of Laurentius Petri, a main character in the Swedish reformation of 1531.

== See also ==
- List of Archbishops of Uppsala
- Archbishop of Uppsala
