= Petrus Filipsson =

Archbishop of Uppsala from 1332 to 1341

Peter Filipsson
- Archbishop of Uppsala; Primate of Sweden
- Church: Roman Catholic
- Archdiocese: Uppsala
- Appointed: 1332
- In office: 1332-1341
- Predecessor: Olov Björnsson
- Successor: Heming Nilsson

Orders
- Rank: Metropolitan Archbishop

Personal details
- Born: Sweden
- Died: 12 August 1341
- Parents: Filip Finvidsson

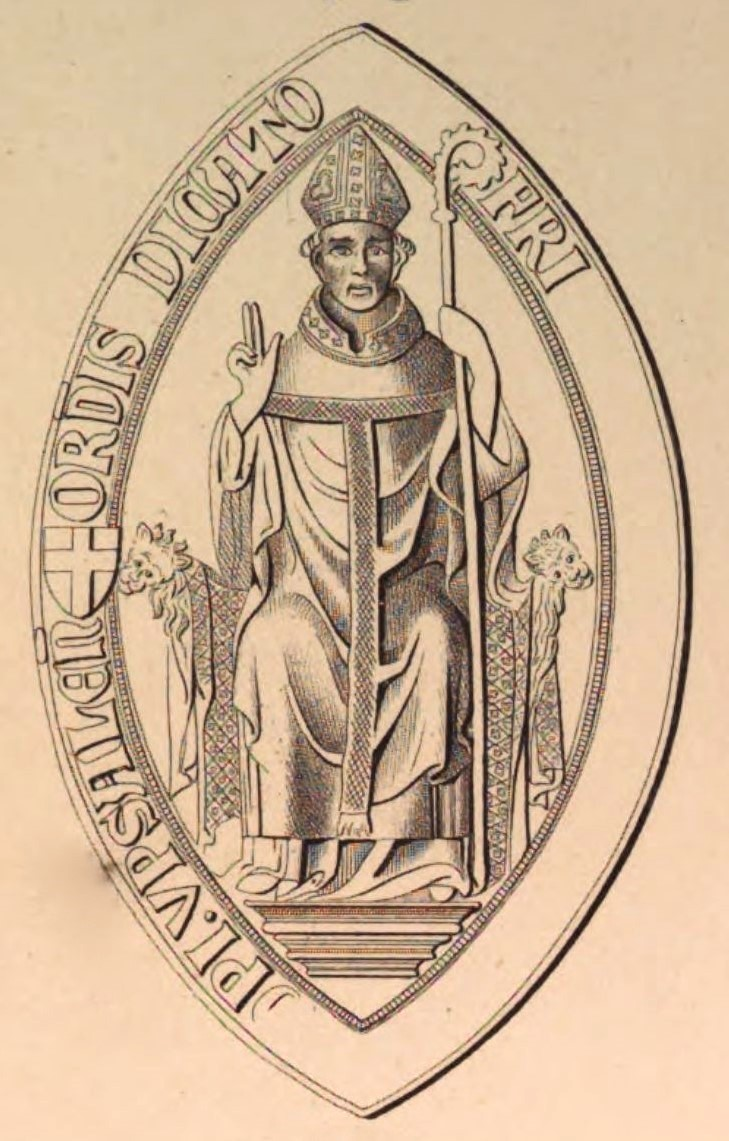
Peter Filipsson, Archbishop of Uppsala

Petrus Filipsson (Latin: Petrus Philippi), also known as Peder Filipsson Röde, was a Swedish Dominican friar and Archbishop of Uppsala from 1332 to 1341.

== Biography ==
He came from Uppland and was a son of the important noble family being son of Filip Finvidsson of Rumbyätten, also called Filip Röde. His mother was the daughter of Karl Tjelveson of Fånö in Löts parish in Uppland. His forefathers were important magnates in Uppland who were said to have descended from royal stock. According to folk legend, they were related to several early medieval kings.

During the previous century, his close forefathers and relatives had apparently been associated with the Folkunge Party (Folkungaätten) which several times were in rebellion against the power of the central government. His uncle, John of Fånö, had been executed in 1280 and his father, Filip Finvidson, only just spared his life, by paying immense monetary penalties. The family had then allied with central government. One of his sisters (Ingegerd Filipsdotter) married an illegitimate nephew of King Magnus III of Sweden (Magnus Birgersson).

Petrus had only a brief-period ecclesiastical career before he was elected Archbishop. Following his election, he travelled to Avignon, where the Pope John XXII was residing, to get ordained into the episcopal office. In 1336 he crowned the King Magnus IV of Sweden in Stockholm. In 1337, he belonged to a monastic order and was ineligible to inherit secular property. Swedish law of that time distinguishing between monks and priests (the latter were eligible to inherit). He had a disagreement with the Franciscan order. On behalf of the pope, Archbishop of Nidaros Pål Bårdsson made a judgment on the matter. It led to a settlement between the two parties in 1339.

In 1341, Archbishop Petrus died and was buried at the Dominican Church in Sigtuna, today known as St. Mary's Church, Sigtuna (Mariakyrkan).

== See also ==
- List of archbishops of Uppsala

== Other sources ==
- Nordisk Familjebok (Uggelupplagan, page 741)
- Fånöätten (Äldere Svenska Frälsesläkter)
