= Carl Jesper Benzelius =

Swedish theologian, professor, and bishop

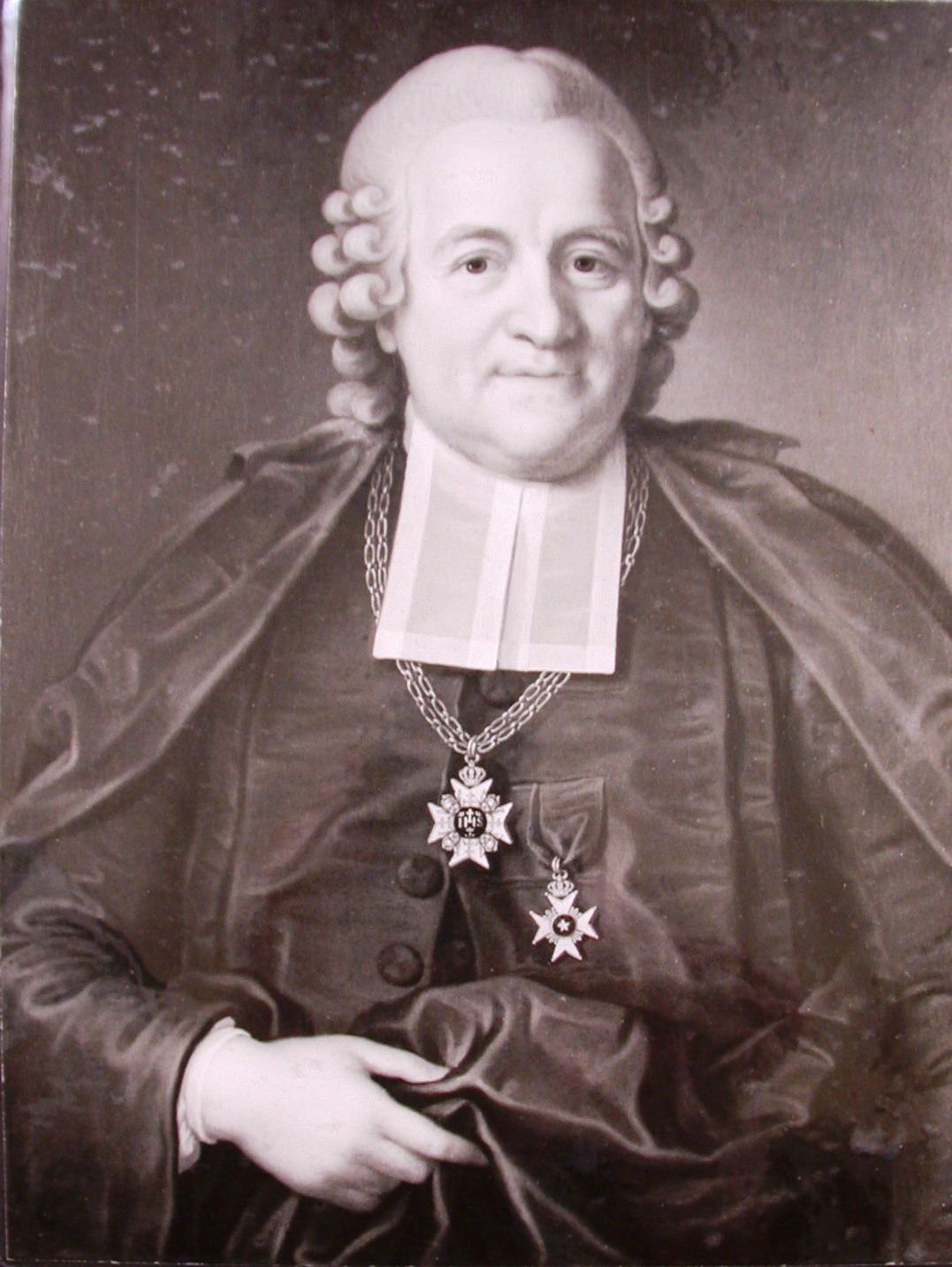
- Church: Church of Sweden
- Diocese: Diocese of Strängnäs
- In office: 1776–1793
- Predecessor: Jacob Serenius
- Successor: Stefan Insulin

Personal details
- Born: 16 January 1714; Uppsala, Sweden
- Died: 2 January 1793 (aged 78); Strängäs, Sweden

Carl Jesper Benzelius (16 January 1714 – 2 January 1793) was a Swedish theologian, professor, and bishop of the Diocese of Strängnäs from 1776 to 1793.

== Biography ==
Born in Uppsala to archbishop Erik Benzelius the younger, Benzelius was brought up at the home of his grandfather, Bishop Jesper Swedberg. He was then guided by his uncle Henric Benzelius at Lund University and graduated with his Master of Arts degree in 1738, after which he spent a few years in England, France and Holland. In 1741 he became a temporary priest of the royal court, receiving a permanent position in 1742.

Between 1743 and 1744, he again traveled abroad, and stayed particularly in Helmstedt, where he defended his dissertation under the famous Johann Lorenz von Mosheim, and became an honorary doctor of theology. In Berlin he presided over the marriage of Adolf Frederick of Sweden and Louisa Ulrika of Prussia and was and was accepted as Louisa Ulrika's teacher of the Swedish language. In 1748, Benzelius married Johanna Helena Arnell, daughter of vicar Lars Arnell and Johanna Kolthoff. In 1750 he was called to Lund as professor of theology. His siblings were ennobled with the name Benzelstierna; however, Benzelius kept his name.

Benzelius was quiet and meek. He is portrayed as a more capable learned professor and being more appreciated as a friend and family man than being an apt head of a diocese. This, however, became his lot when he was appointed bishop of Strängnäs in 1776. The following year he was called, with a plurality vote, to become the bishop of Lund, and though he himself wished to remain in Lund, he was subject to the wishes of Gustaf III, and had to cede his position to Olof Celsius the Younger. He was a member of the Riksdag of the Estates in 1778 and 1786. In 1778 he became a member of Pro Fide et Christianismo, a Christian education society. Benzelius died in Strängnäs 2 January 1793.
