= Laurentius Petri Gothus =

Swedish religious leader

The Most Reverend Laurentius Petri Gothus
- Archbishop of Uppsala; Primate of Sweden
- Church: Church of Sweden
- Archdiocese: Uppsala
- Appointed: 1574
- In office: 1574–1579
- Predecessor: Laurentius Petri
- Successor: Andreas Laurentii Björnram

Orders
- Consecration: 14 July 1575 by Jacob Johannis
- Rank: Metropolitan Archbishop

Personal details
- Born: 1529 or 1530 Söderköping, Sweden
- Died: 12 February 1579 Uppsala, Sweden
- Spouse: Margareta Larsdotter
- Children: 2

Laurentius Petri Gothus (died 12 February 1579) was the second Swedish Lutheran Archbishop of Uppsala, Sweden. He served from 1575 to 1579.

== Biography ==
He was born Lars Petersson in either 1529 or 1530 in the province of Östergötland, from which his name Gothus was derived as a means of distinguishing him from his predecessor, Laurentius Petri Nericius.

Nericius recommended Gothus' appointment as court chaplain to King Erik XIV in 1560. When Erik's successor, John III, was crowned, John preferred Gothus to Nericius because Gothus was more in agreement with the king's own view on Lutheranism. They advocated a middle way between Catholicism and Lutheranism in Sweden, unlike Nericius, who was more inclined to Luther's teachings.

He was consecrated bishop on 14 July 1575 by Jacob Johannis of Skara and co-consecrated by Paulus Juusten of Turku, in a ceremony with Catholic elements, including a Mitre and typical Catholic rituals.

In the 1570s, the Jesuits were allowed to spread their messages. As a reaction, Gothus wrote several texts against papism and liturgy. At times his writing showed his support of liturgy yet he still supported Luther's ideas.

== See also ==
- List of Archbishops of Uppsala
