= Erik Benzelius =

Erik Benzelius may refer to:

- Erik Benzelius the Elder (1632–1709), bishop of Strängnäs, later archbishop of Uppsala
- Erik Benzelius the Younger (1675–1743), bishop of Gothenburg, later of Linköping, finally appointed archbishop of Uppsala
