= Fecht =

Fecht may refer to:

People

- Hans-Jörg Fecht (born 1957), German scientist
- Özay Fecht (born 1953), Turkish-German actress and jazz singer
- Petrus Michaelis Fecht (died 1576), Swedish theologian

Places

- Fecht (river), a tributary of the Ill in northeastern France
