= Uppsala Synod =

1593 synod of the Church of Sweden

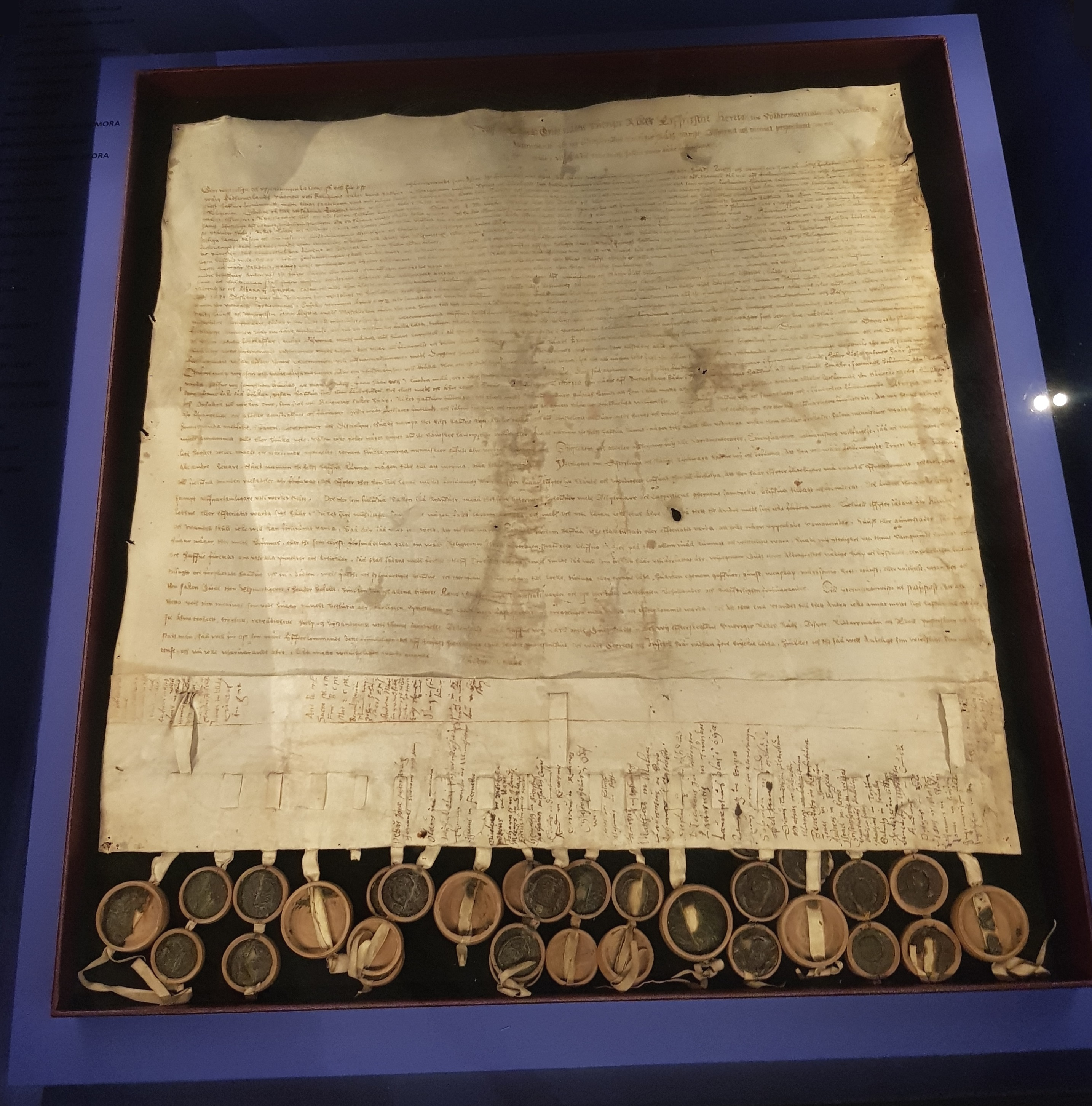
A document from the Synod

The Uppsala Synod in 1593 was the most important synod of the Lutheran Church of Sweden. Sweden had gone through its Protestant Reformation and broken with Roman Catholicism in the 1520s, but an official confession of faith had never been declared. King Sigismund, who had Catholic faith, inherited the Swedish throne in November 1592, which raised a need to formalise Lutheran faith.

== History ==
The synod was summoned to Uppsala by Duke Charles, heir to the Swedish throne. Four bishops and over 300 priests were also present. The synod was opened on March 1, by Nils Göransson Gyllenstierna, and on the following day Nicolaus Olai Bothniensis, a professor of theology at the Uppsala University, was elected chairman.

By March 5, the synod had decided to declare the Holy Scripture the sole guideline for religion. The three creeds—the Apostles', the Nicene, and the Athanasian—were officially recognized, and the unaltered Lutheran Augsburg Confession (1530) was adopted.

After the unanimous acceptance of the unaltered Augsburg Confession, Nicolaus Olai Bothniensis, who was presiding, exclaimed, "Now Sweden is one man, and we all have one Lord and God."

Another important decision was that only the Lutheran doctrine was to be allowed; Calvinism, Roman Catholicism, and Zwinglianism were all officially banned. The Catholic-inclined liturgy of King John III of Sweden (1537–1592) was also rejected.

On March 15, Abraham Angermannus was elected Archbishop of Uppsala.

The meeting closed on March 20, after its decrees were signed—first by Duke Charles, members of the council, and bishops, and then by representatives from all over the country.

In the international book series Corpus Christianorum, a critical edition of the synod's decision is published together with a detailed commentary in English.

== Signatories of the Uppsala Synod ==
Signatories of the Uppsala Synod were, among others:

- Christopherus Stephani Bellinus
- Johannes Stephani Bellinus
- Nicolaus Olai Bothniensis
- Laurentius Paulinus Gothus
- Olaus Canuti Helsingius
- Petrus Kenicius
- Olaus Martini
- Erik Sparre
- Ericus Erici Sorolainen
