= Olov Lambatunga =

Archbishop of Uppsala from 1198 to 1206

Olov Lambatunga was Archbishop of Uppsala from 1198 to 1206.

== Biography ==
Little is known about Archbishop Olov. He was archbishop during the Papacy of Pope Innocent III (1198–1216). A couple of papal letters exist: In 1200, Pope Innocent III declared that Roman Catholic Church estates were free from government taxes and that clerics should not be subjected to the courts and judges of the government, but by bishops and prelates, as a step to separate the worldly and spiritual matters.

In the second letter, the Pope demands Olov dismiss two bishops that Olov's predecessor Archbishop Petrus had appointed because they lacked proper heredity. Absalon, Archbishop of Lund, requested the Pope to interact since the bishops which Petrus had elected in 1196 were the sons of other priests which was not allowed according to the Canon law of the Catholic Church. There is also a letter from Olov to the Pope sent after Uppsala burnt in 1204. Olov asked for a new pallium, because his old had burnt. The request was granted.

== See also ==
- List of archbishops of Uppsala

== Sources ==
- Åsbrink, Gustav & Westman, Knut B. Svea rikes ärkebiskopar från 1164 till nuvarande tid (Stockholm: Bokförlaget Natur och Kultur, 1935)
- Paulsson, Göte Annales Suecici medii aevi (Stockholm: Gleerup, 1974)
