= Johannes Stephani Bellinus =

Swedish Prelate

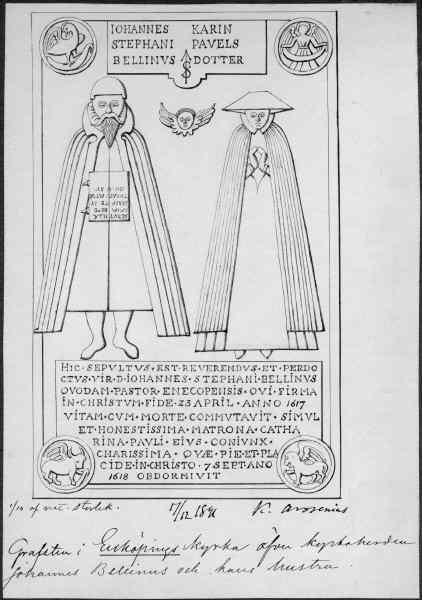
Johannes Stephani Bellinus with spouse on tombstone with Latin inscription inside Church of Our Lady in Enköping, Sweden. Illustration (1891) by Karl Arosenius.

Johannes Stephani Bellinus (died 1617) was a Swedish prelate and vicar in Enköping, Sweden.

Johannes Stephani Bellinus was son to Stephanus Andreae and brother to Olaus Stephani Bellinus and Christopherus Stephani Bellinus.

He served as pastor in Bälinge, Archdiocese of Uppsala 1572 and in Enköping. He participated at the Uppsala synod in 1593. Bellinus was in good standing to the kings John III och Sigismund but not the Duke Charles, who opposed his appointment altogether despite vocal advocacy by the local community.

Johannes Stephani Bellinus was discharged from his office at the time that the same thing happened to his brother, bishop Olaus Stephani Bellinus. Despite attributions to high age, unapproval of Duke Charles seems to have been a major factor. Bellinus was succeeded by Ericus Olai Skepperus.

Bellinus retreated to the estate that he had been given by King Sigismund, where he ended his days. He died in 1617 and was buried in the Church of Our Lady in Enköping, Sweden, with the inscription:

Hic Sepultus Est Reverendus Et Perdoctus Vir D. Johannes Stephani Bellinus Quondom Pastor Enecopensis Qui Firma In Christum Fide 23 April Anno 1617 Vitam cum Morte Commutavit
