= Jonas Magni Wexionensis =

Swedish bishop

The Right Reverend Jonas Magni Wexionensis
- Bishop of Skara
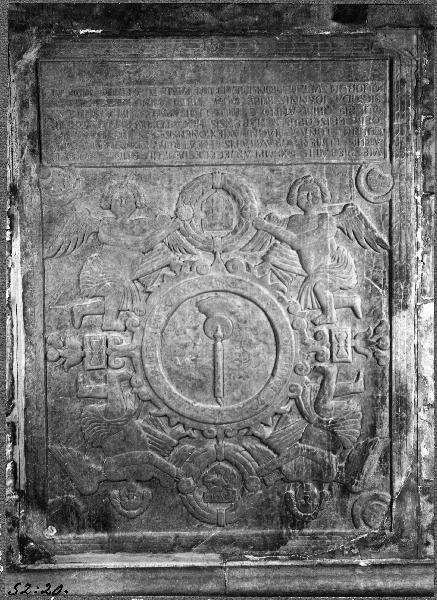
- Church: Church of Sweden
- Diocese: Skara
- In office: 1640–1651
- Predecessor: Sveno Svenonis
- Successor: Olof Fristadius

Orders
- Consecration: 13 January 1631 by Laurentius Paulinus Gothus

Personal details
- Born: 11 March 1583 Växjö, Sweden
- Died: 3 April 1651 (aged 68) Skara, Sweden
- Buried: Skara Cathedral
- Denomination: Lutheran
- Parents: Magnus Petri & Ingerd Jönsdotter
- Spouse: Sigrid Johansdotter Bubb
- Children: 7

Jonas Magni Wexionensis (11 March 1583 - 3 April 1651) was a Swedish prelate who was a professor and head of Uppsala University and served as Bishop of Skara from 1640 till 1651.

== Early life ==
Jonas Magni was born on 11 March 1583 in Växjö, Sweden. He added the name Wexionensis in honor of his birthplace. His father was Magnus Petri who was vicar in Växjö. His mother was Ingerd Jönsdotter and had a total of eleven children, all males who became church leaders. He was educated in Växjö and Linköping and later studied at Uppsala University. After the death of his father from the plague, he left for Germany where he remained for ten years. He studied for a master's degree in Wittenberg in 1610, which studied where partly financed through a royal scholarship. Upon his return to Sweden in 1614, Wexionensis was appointed ethics professor in Uppsala University.

== Professor in Uppsala ==
As a professor of ethics, Jonas Magni Wexionensis was in conflict with those who defended Ramism, including Laurentius Paulinus Gothus who was backed by the chancellor of the university Johan Skytte. In 1620, Jonas Magni's ethics professorship was changed into the professorship in history, a consequence of the importance he gave to Aristotle, above that of Petrus Ramus. However, in the 1620s, Johan Skytte's philosophical views concerning Aristotle shifted and consequently, he appointed Jonas Magni as the professor of theology in 1624, a post he undertook two years after the appointment.

== Bishop ==
During his time at the university, he served as head for three times. He was nominated as Archbishop of Uppsala in 1636 but Axel Oxenstierna, the Lord High Chancellor of Sweden, did not view him as having the necessary authority to be Archbishop. Nevertheless, in 1640 he was appointed Bishop of Skara. He was consecrated in Stockholm on 13 January 1641 by Archbishop Laurentius Paulinus Gothus and was commissioned to commence his episcopacy in Skara on 3 March. In 1641 he founded the Katedralskolan, Skara, which was also approved by Queen Christina on 31 August that year. In 1647 he was once more nominated for the Archbishopric of Uppsala, however he received 39 votes and was defeated by Johannes Canuti Lenaeus whom he then consecrated.

== Family ==
Jonas Magni Wexionensis was married to Sigrid Johansdotter Bubb and had seven children.
