= Stephanus Andreae =

Swedish vicar

Stephanus Andreae, floruit 1571, was a Swedish vicar in Bälinge, Archdiocese of Uppsala, and Member of the Clergy of the Riksdag of the Estates of Sweden.

Stephanus Andreae was the father of Olaus Stephani Bellinus, Christopherus Stephani Bellinus and Johannes Stephani Bellinus.

He participated as Member of the Clergy of the Riksdag of the Estates of Sweden in 1571.
