= St. Mary's Church, Sigtuna =

Coordinates: 59°37′06″N 17°43′22″E

Saint Mary's Church
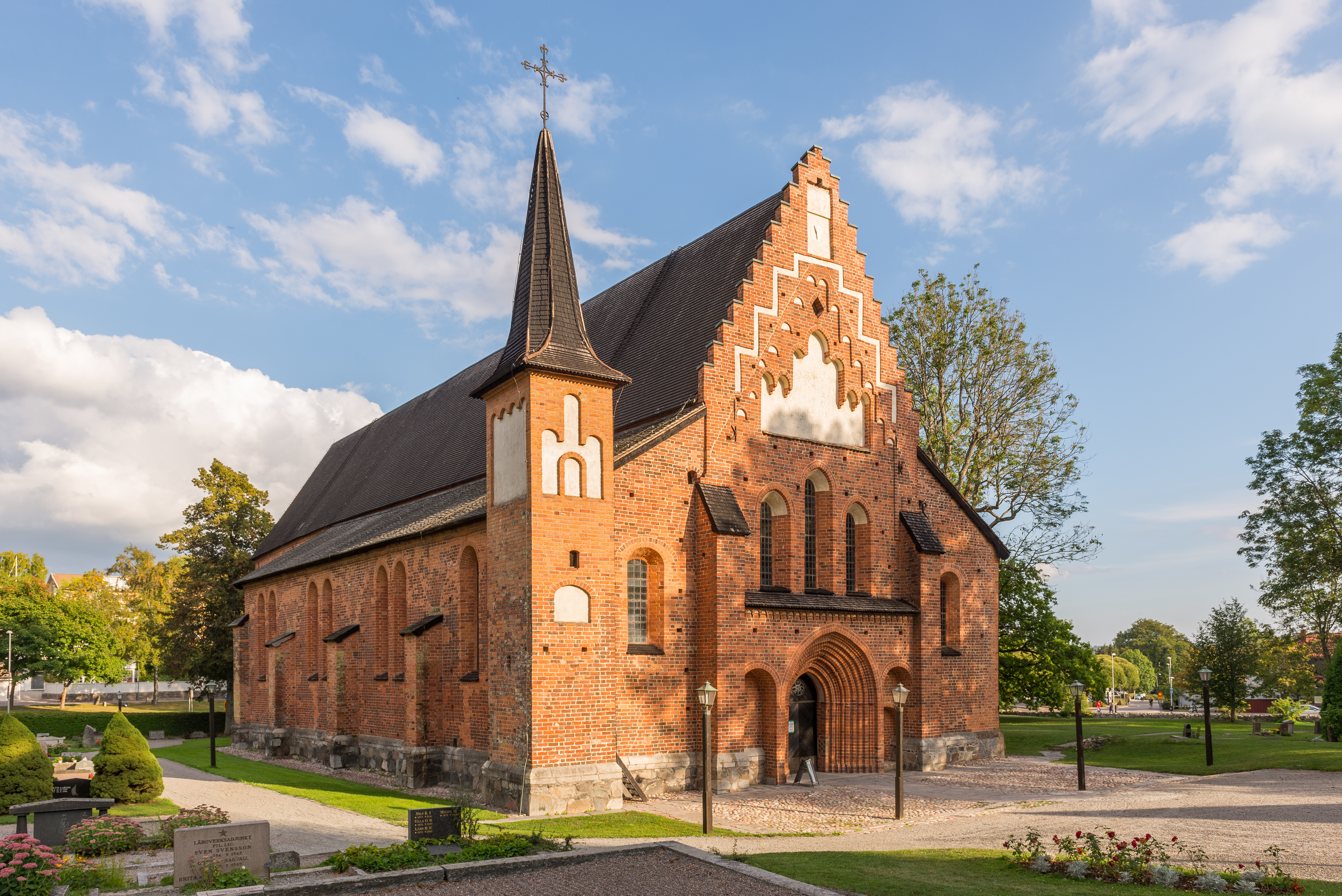
- Saint Mary's Church
- Location: Stockholm County
- Country: Sweden
- Denomination: Church of Sweden

History
- Dedication: Blessed Virgin Mary

Architecture
- Functional status: Active

Administration
- Archdiocese: Archdiocese of Uppsala
- Parish: Sigtuna Parish

St. Mary's Church (Swedish: Mariakyrkan) is a Lutheran church in Sigtuna, not far from Stockholm, Sweden. It belongs to the Archdiocese of Uppsala.

== History ==
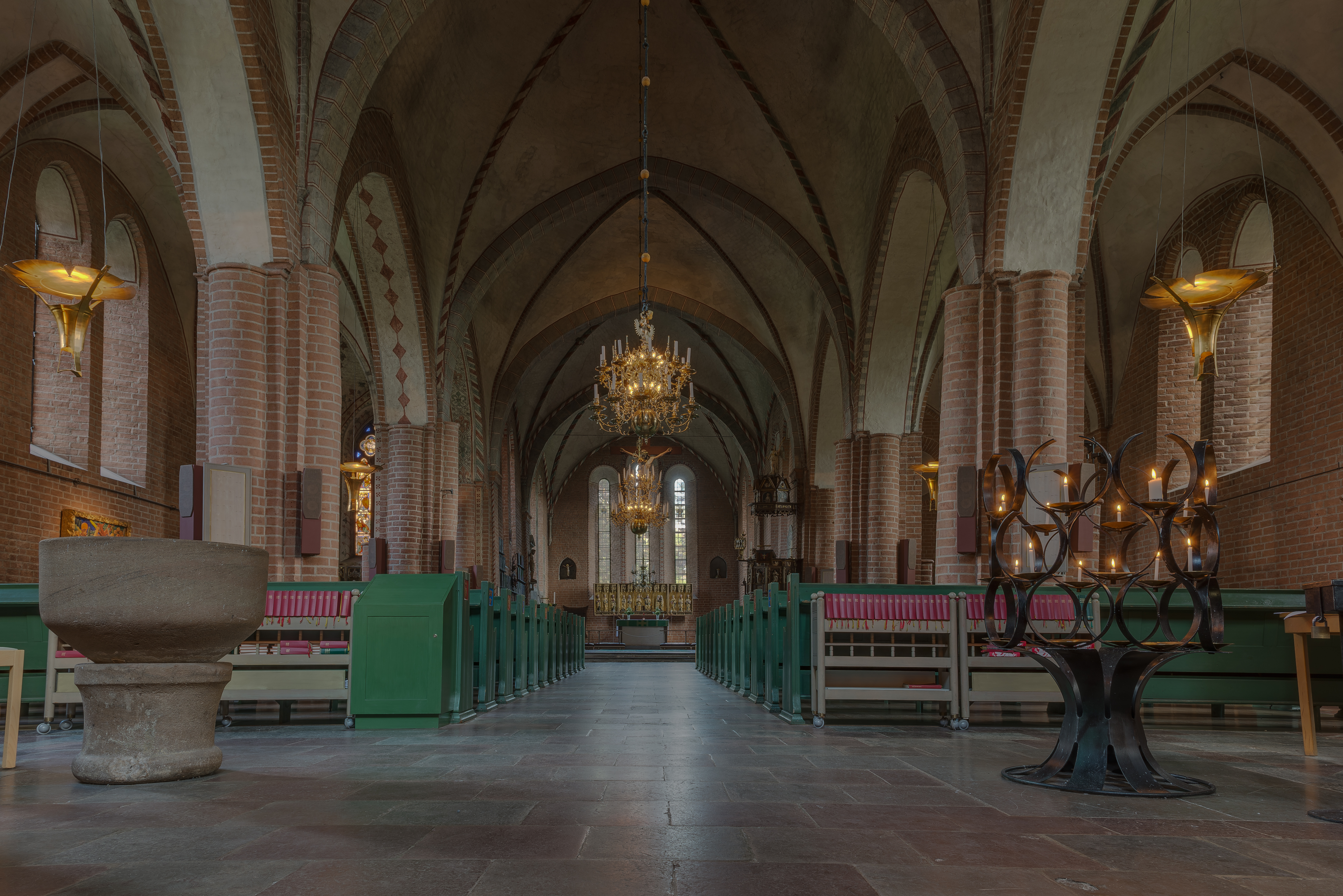
View of the interior towards the altar

The church was built by the Dominican order as their convent church, and construction began in the 1230s. The church was inaugurated in 1247, but was probably not finished until 1255, when Jarler, Archbishop of Uppsala, was entombed in the church.

The Dominicans had tried to establish a presence in the city earlier, but had not succeeded. The church was built as part of a larger monastic complex. Of this convent nothing remains today; it was closed during the Reformation and the bricks used as building materials, e.g. at Svartsjö Palace and Venngarn Castle. The church is the only medieval church in Sigtuna to have survived the Reformation; the city has an additional three medieval church ruins.

During the 1280s, the church was expanded and partly remade. No major alterations were then made of the church until a renovation in 1904–05. The church was again renovated and upgrade between 1966 and 1971 under the direction of architects Bengt Romare (1902–1968) and Jerk Alton.

== Architecture ==
The church is built of brick in a transitional style, between Romanesque and Gothic. It is the earliest known brick church in the area around Lake Mälaren. The church is built as a hall church with two aisles and a central nave. The church lacks an apse and to the east finishes in a straight wall. Internally, it was decorated with frescos, some of which are medieval and some of which are reproductions from the 1904-05 renovation. Externally, the façade is decorated with blind arches. One of the church bells is of Russian origin, taken as loot during the Ingrian War. It was made in Pskov.

== See also ==
- List of Brick Gothic buildings
