= Petrus Torkilsson =

Archbishop of Uppsala from 1351 to 1366

- Archbishop of Uppsala; Primate of Sweden
- Church: Roman Catholic
- Archdiocese: Uppsala
- Appointed: 1351
- In office: 1351–1366
- Predecessor: Heming Nilsson
- Successor: Birger Gregersson
- Previous post: Bishop of Linköping (1342–1351)

Orders
- Consecration: by Pope Clement VI
- Rank: Metropolitan Archbishop

Personal details
- Born: Skänninge, Sweden
- Died: 18 October 1366

Petrus Torkilsson (Latin: Petrus Tyrgilli) was Bishop of Linköping, 1342–1351 and Archbishop of Uppsala, Sweden, 1351–1366.

It is unknown when he was born, but the first mentioning of him is from 1320, when he was vicar in Färentuna. He was chancellor of the King Magnus Eriksson in 1340 and continued to support him during the civil wars in the 1360s.

== See also ==
- List of archbishops of Uppsala
