= Valerius (archbishop of Uppsala) =

Archbishop of Uppsala from 1207 to 1219

Valerius was the Swedish Archbishop 1207–1219 (or as late as 1224). He was the fifth archbishop after the establishment of the see in 1164.

== Appointment ==
At the establishment of the archiepiscopal see at Uppsala in 1164, the Pope did not have enough faith in Swedish Christianity and therefore made the Archbishop of Lund in Denmark the primate over Uppsala. When Valerius was elected in Uppsala in 1207, the Danish archbishop objected on the grounds that he had a clerical ancestry, and priests and other clergymen were not allowed to marry. In Sweden, the practice of priests marrying continued far into the Middle Ages because of the low population numbers.

The Pope allowed a dispensation for Valerius on the grounds that there was no other suitable candidate and because Valierus was known as a learned man with good customs and virtues.

== Civil war ==
Valerius joined side with the King Sverker II of Sweden, who belonged to the House of Sverker. The House of Sverker was one of the antagonists in a civil war that had been going on and off since 1130. In 1208 the opposing side, the House of Eric, seized the power, and the king fled the country, taking Valerius with him. They exiled in Denmark.

Sverker gathered a small army and tried to conquer Sweden, but was killed. Valerius bowed down and accepted the opposing King Eric Knutsson. As a result, he was allowed to return to Uppsala, where he crowned Eric in 1210. The Pope Innocent III sent a letter to Valerius where he proclaimed the procedure to be unauthorized and unlawful, but it seems to have had little impact.

== Establishment of the church in Finland ==
Valerius seems to have been involved in the earliest phases of the Diocese of Finland. In 1209, when he was exiled in Denmark, Anders Sunesen, Archbishop of Lund, contacted Pope Innocent III in order to have a new bishop appointed for Finland. Similar to Valerius, the unnamed bishop hopeful had adequacy issues that were however omitted on Anders' recommendation in the lack of suitable candidates, the same excuse that had made Valerius the Archbishop. The church in Finland was said to have been established "newly" as the work of "a few noble men".

Years later, Valerius is said to have been in touch with the Pope directly, worried about the "barbarian" attacks to Finland. The Pope mentions this in 1221 in his letter to the unnamed Bishop of Finland who was now authorized to establish a trade embargo against the hostiles. In the letter, the church in Finland was again said to have been of recent origin.

== Later years ==
King Eric Knutsson died in 1216. Valerius lived on to crown the succeeding King John in 1219, when he came of age.

According to medieval Chronicon rerum Sveogothicarum and Chronologia vetus, Valerius died later that year on April 7, 1219, and was buried in the church in Old Uppsala. However, some historians regard that the chroniclers had the year of his death wrong, assuming that he died closer to the appointment of his predecessor Olov Basatömer in 1224.

== See also ==
- List of archbishops of Uppsala

== Sources ==
- Svea Rikes Ärkebiskopar, 1935, Uppsala
