= Jacob Johannis =

Swedish bishop

The Right Reverend Jacob Johannis
- Bishop of Skara
- Church: Church of Sweden
- Diocese: Skara
- In office: 1569–1595
- Predecessor: Erik Nicolai Swart
- Successor: Henrik Gadolenus

Orders
- Consecration: 1569 by Laurentius Petri

Personal details
- Denomination: Lutheran

Jacob Johannis was a Swedish prelate who was Bishop of Skara from 1569 till 1595. In 1593 he was formally deposed from his role as bishop of Skara however he retained the title till 1595.
