= Johannes Canuti Lenaeus =

Swedish professor and religious leader

The Most Reverend Johannes Canuti Lenaeus
- Archbishop of Uppsala; Primate of Sweden
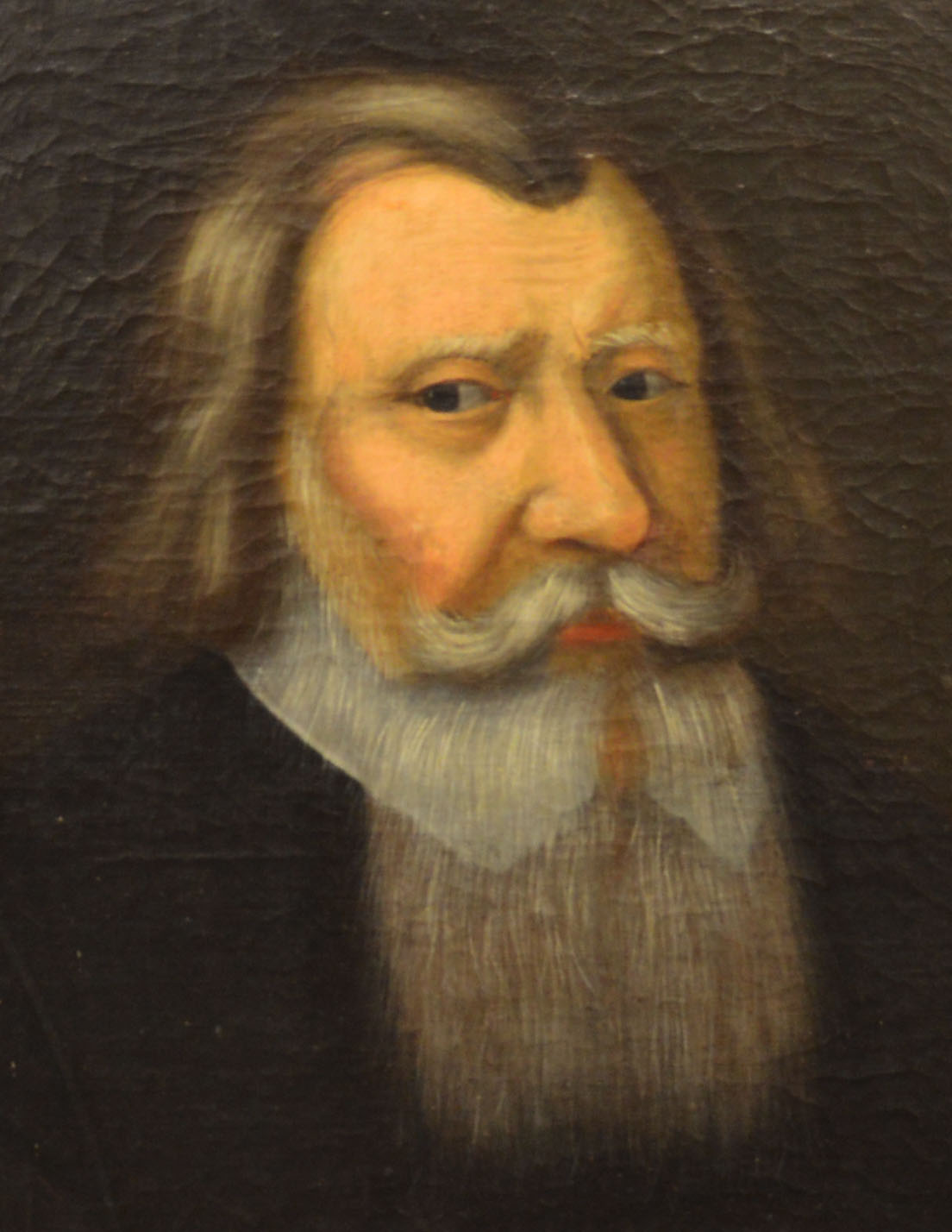
- Church: Church of Sweden
- Archdiocese: Uppsala
- Appointed: 1647
- In office: 1647–1669
- Predecessor: Laurentius Paulinus Gothus
- Successor: Lars Stigzelius

Orders
- Consecration: 14 March 1647 by Jonas Magni Wexionensis
- Rank: Metropolitan Archbishop

Personal details
- Born: 29 November 1573 Lena, Uppland, Sweden
- Died: 23 April 1669 (aged 95) Uppsala, Sweden
- Parents: Canutus Petri Gestricius; Margareta Persdotter
- Spouse: Catharina Kenicia
- Education: Uppsala University

Johannes Canuti Lenaeus (29 November 1573 – 23 April 1669) was a professor at Uppsala University and Archbishop of Uppsala in the Church of Sweden.

== Biography ==
Lenaeus was born at Länna parish in Uppland, Sweden where his father was parish priest. After several years of studies, mainly in Germany at universities in Rostock and Wittenberg, he was appointed professor of logic at Uppsala University in 1604. After being ordained priest, he was in 1613 also appointed deputy vice-rector and professor of theology. After more studies in Germany, he was also appointed professor in Greek and Hebrew. In 1638, he was named the first theology professor and clergyman at Uppsala. Lenaeus was appointed Archbishop in 1647.

He text he wrote, Logica peripatetica (1633), gave a revival to the philosophy of peripatetics (Aristotelian philosophy).

Lenaeus was married in 1612 with Catharina Kenicia, daughter of Petrus Kenicius who was Archbishop of Uppsala from 1609 to his death in 1636.

== Other sources ==
- Nordisk Familjebok (1912), article Lenaeus
