= Laurentius Paulinus Gothus =

Swedish theologian

The Most Reverend Laurentius Paulinus Gothus
- Archbishop of Uppsala; Primate of Sweden
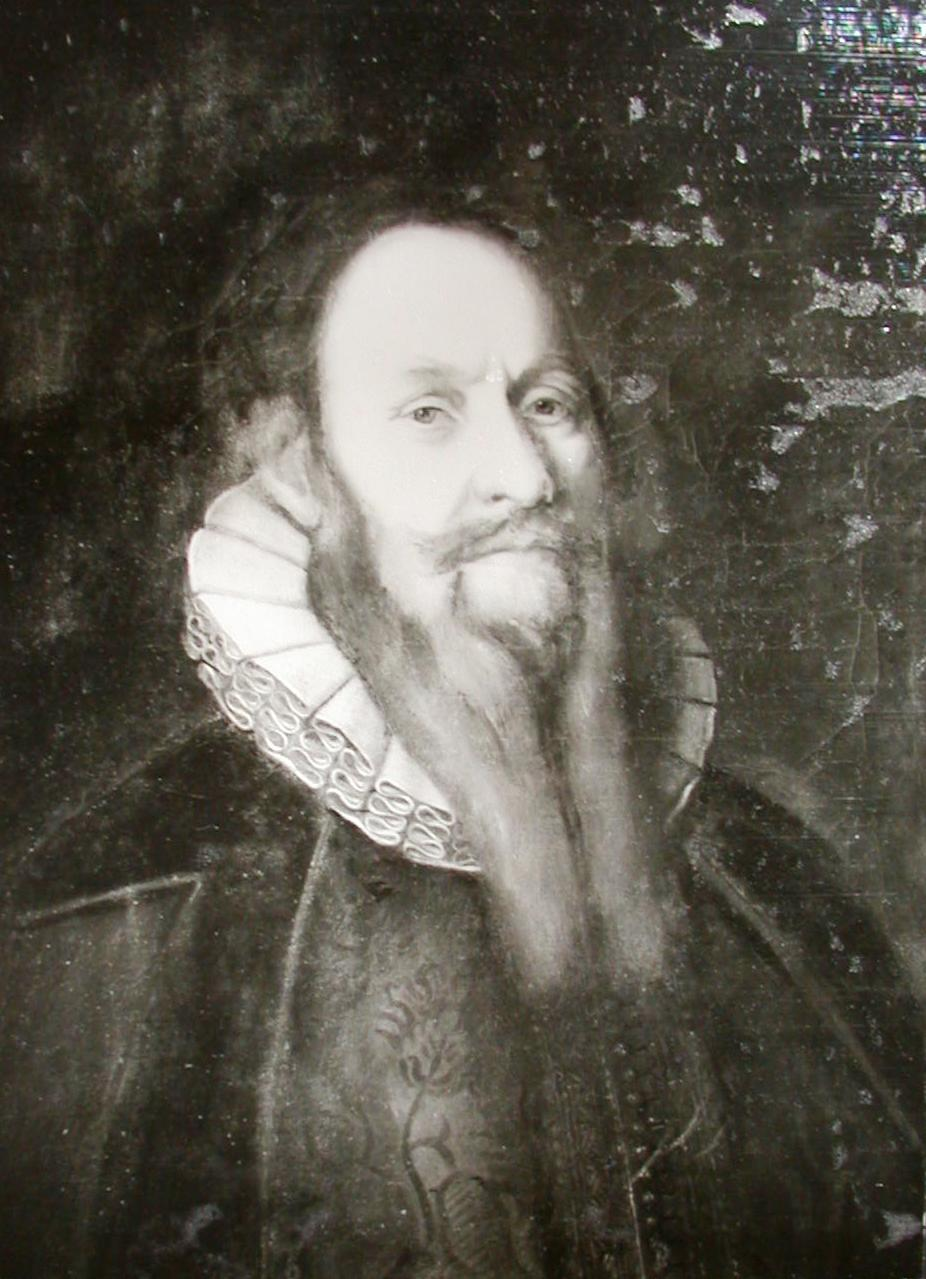
- Church: Church of Sweden
- Archdiocese: Uppsala
- Appointed: 1637
- Installed: 1637
- Term ended: 29 November 1646
- Predecessor: Petrus Kenicius
- Successor: Johannes Canuti Lenaeus
- Previous posts: Bishop of Skara (1608–1609); Bishop of Strängnäs (1609–1637)

Orders
- Consecration: 3 August 1608 by Olaus Martini
- Rank: Metropolitan Archbishop

Personal details
- Born: 10 November 1565 Söderköping, Sweden
- Died: 29 November 1646 (aged 81) Uppsala, Sweden
- Buried: Strängnäs Cathedral
- Parents: Påvel Pedersson; Karin Pedersdotter
- Spouse: Catharina Olofsdotter (Till 1623); Brita Eriksdotter
- Education: Uppsala University

Laurentius Paulinus Gothus (10 November 1565 – 29 November 1646) was a Swedish theologian, astronomer and Archbishop of Uppsala.

== Biography ==
Gothus was born Lars Paulsson at Söderköping in Östergötland County, Sweden. In 1588, Gothus travelled to Germany and studied in the Rostock University for three years. He was influenced by Pierre de la Ramée (1515–1572) and his philosophy.

After receiving a Master's degree, he returned to Uppsala in time for the Uppsala Synod in 1593 where the founding dogmas of the Church of Sweden were made final. He was appointed professor of logic at the recently reopened, and now Lutheran focused, Uppsala University. In 1598 he re-transferred himself to the professorship in astronomy.

He was, along with some other professors, suspended from his duty, because of demands that professors to sign a petition supporting Sigismund III Vasa as king of Sweden. However, in 1604, his Protestant uncle Duke Charles was crowned as King Charles IX of Sweden. When a comet appeared on the sky in 1607, Laurentius declared he could interpret what this signified. The belief in astrology and the significance of heavenly signs were still strong. His interpretations made an impression on King Charles and he was re-instated him at the university.

Laurentius had acquired a belief in Ramism from the writings French educational reformer Petrus Ramus and defended his views rigorously. Later he was also involved in philosophical disputes with Jonas Magni Wexionensis (1583–1651) who was a professor and head of Uppsala University and who was an adherent of Aristotle.

Gothus served as Bishop of the Diocese of Skara (1608–1609) and Bishop of the Diocese of Strängnäs (1609–1637). In 1628, he was tasked with the investigation of the visionary Margareta i Kumla. Her visions and alleged meetings with demons and angels were described by Bishop Gothus in a meeting of the Swedish clergy in 1629. During the reign of Christina, Queen of Sweden, Gothus served as Archbishop of Uppsala and Primate of Sweden from 1637 to 1646.

== Works ==
Laurentius wrote many theological and astronomical works and also published calendars. He furthermore published a thorough Ethica Christiana 1615–30, a work in six parts in Swedish about Lutheranism. Following this, he in 1631 wrote a summary of this work which has been called the prime catechetical work from 17th century Sweden. He also wrote some historical works about Swedish history.

Ethicae christianae:

- Ethicae christianæ pars prima, de ratione bene vivendi; Thet är: Catechismi förste deel, om Gudz lagh (Stockholm, 1617),
- Ethicae christianae partis secundae … tomus prior de evangelio; Thet är: Catechismi andra dels förre tractat, om then ewangeliske lärona (Stockholm, 1624),
- Ethicae christianae, partis secundae … tomus posterior, De ratione beate vivendi; Thet är: Catechismi andra deels efterfolgende tractat (Stockholm, 1625),
- Ethicae christianae praxis generalis, de poenitentia: Thet är: Catechismi almennelighe brwk och öffning (Stockholm, 1625),
- Praxeos specialis ethicae christianae partis secundæ, tomus primus, de monarchia pacata; Thet är: Hwstaflans andra deels första stycke om politisch öfwerhetz enskilte fridz regemente (Stockholm, 1628),
- Praxeos specialis ethicae christianae partis secundae, tomus secundus de monarchia turbata; Thet är: Hwstaflans andra deels andra stycke, om politisch öffwerhetz stridz regemente (Stockholm, 1629),
- Praxeos specialis ethicæ christianae partis secundæ, tomus tertius, de archomenoscopia; Thet är: Hwstaflans andra deels tridje stycke om vnderdåners stand och plichtighet (Stockholm, 1630).
