= Petrus (archbishop of Uppsala) =

Archbishop of Uppsala from 1187 to 1197

Petrus was the third archbishop of Uppsala, Sweden, between 1187 and 1197.

He was ordained by the mighty Danish archbishop Absalon in Lund, the primate of Sweden at that time. When Sweden got a new king, Sverker, who was related to the Danish Royal Court, Absalon extended his authority over Sweden. When Petrus in 1196 elected three bishops, Absalon requested the Pope to interact since the bishops were the sons of other priests, and this was not allowed according to Canon law. He also mentioned that several Swedish bishops refused to travel to Absalon's synods. Absalon was an authoritative person whom the Pope entrusted and gave him right, but by this time Petrus had already died.

== See also ==
- List of archbishops of Uppsala
