= Minuscule 400 =

- New Testament manuscript
- Name: Cod. Berolinensis
- Text: Matthew, Acts, Cath., Paul
- Date: 12th century
- Script: Greek
- Now at: Vatican Library
- Size: 12.4 cm by 9.4 cm
- Category: none

Minuscule 400 is a Greek minuscule manuscript of the New Testament, made of parchment. It is designated by the siglum 400 in the Gregory-Aland numbering of New Testament manuscripts, and δ 50 in the von Soden numbering of New Testament manuscripts. Using the study of comparative writing styles (palaeography), it has been assigned to the 12th century.

== Description ==
The manuscript is a codex (precursor to the modern book format), containing the text of the Gospel of Matthew 12:29-13:2, Acts of the Apostles, Catholic epistles, and Pauline epistles on 249 parchment leaves (sized 12.4 cm by 9.4 cm) with some missing portions. The text is written in one column per page, in 14-15 lines per page. It contains the Euthalian Apparatus.

Missing sections

- Matthew 1:1-23:27
- Acts, 1:11-2:11
- Romans 1:1-27
- 1 Corinthians 14:12-15:46
- 2 Corinthians 1:1-8; 5:4-19
- 1 Timothy 4:1-Hebrews 1:9

== Text ==
The Greek text of the manuscript is considered to be a representative of the Byzantine text-type. Biblical scholar Kurt Aland did not place it in any Category of his New Testament manuscript classification system.

== History ==
The earliest history of the manuscript is unknown. It was damaged by fire and water at an unknown date. It once belonged to Henry Benzil, Archbishop of Uppsala († 1758), then to Laurence Benzelstierna, Bishop of Arosen. It was described by C. Aurivill (1802), and collated by G. T. Pappelbaum (1815). The manuscript was added to the list of New Testament manuscripts by textual critic Johann M. A. Scholz (1794–1852).

Biblical scholar Caspar René Gregory saw it in 1887. The manuscript is currently housed at the Vatican Library (shelf number Chis. R IV 6 (gr. 6) in Rome.

== See also ==
- Minuscule 401
- Minuscule 399
- List of New Testament minuscules
- Biblical manuscript
- Textual criticism
