= Jarler =

Archbishop of Uppsala from 1236 to 1255

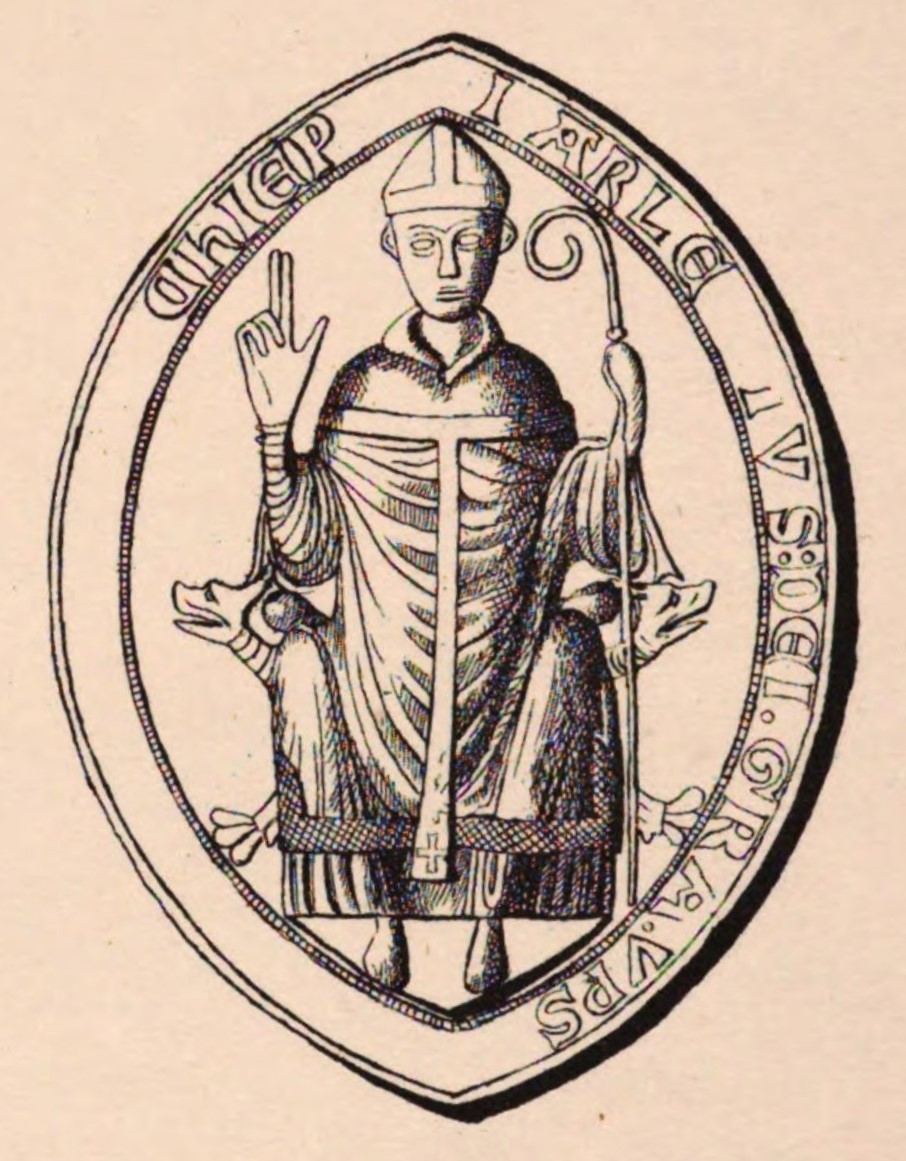
Seal

Jarler (Latin Jarlerius) (died August 22, 1255) was a Swedish Dominican friar and Archbishop of Uppsala from 1236 to 1255.

== Biography ==
Jarler was one of the two earliest known Swedish students at the University of Paris. During his time as archbishop, the Dominican and Franciscan friars settled in Sweden. These orders benefited the Christian awareness among the common populations through their preaching. Cistercians, the previously order in Sweden, did not preach.

In Sweden, the political climate was shaky. In 1247, the house of Folkung (Folkungaätten) revolted against King Eric XI of Sweden, resulting in the Battle of Sparrsätra.

In 1247-48, papal delegate Vilhelm av Sabina was sent to Sweden to investigate the recurring accusations of marriage among priests. Clerical celibacy was a long-standing Church doctrine. Jarler participated at a church meeting at Skänninge in 1248, where it was decided to consecrate the rule of celibacy, the Church's independence of the King, and finally that the archbishop should be elected through a cathedral chapter and not as previously by the King personally. The rules established an important foundation, even though they were not always followed.

In 1254 Jarler sent a letter to Pope Innocent IV applied for dismissal from his office. He was one of the few Swedish archbishops to have made this request. The reasons he gave were that he was old and crippled. The Pope granted his resignation, but before the message had arrived in 1255, Jarler had already died. He was buried in the Dominican convent church in Sigtuna.

== See also ==
- List of archbishops of Uppsala

== Other sources ==
- Åsbrink, Gustav & Westman, Knut B. Svea rikes ärkebiskopar från 1164 till nuvarande tid (Bokförlaget Natur och Kultur, Stockholm 1935)
