= Edenberg family =

Edenberg was once the surname of a Swedish noble family formerly known as Eden. Today, it is a surname used also by Swedish commoners.

The founder of the noble family was Matthias or Theis Eden (1568–1636), a citizen and brewer of Bremen, whose wife was also called Eden. Their son Claus Eden belonged to the cavalry in Lüneburg. He then moved to Stockholm, and later to Uppsala, where he became a merchant (handlande), a citizen of Sweden and a city councilor.

In that capacity, Claus Eden was knighted with the name of Edenberg in 1654 and enrolled in Riddarhuset ("House of Nobility"), with the registration number 617. He thereafter bought the manors of Kiplingeberg and Kättslinge in Uppland and Brunnby in Skåne. He was married twice. His first wife was Gertrude Sulchen, a daughter of a German citizen in Stockholm.

In 1652, Claus Edenberg married Anna Schrodera, daughter of a "castle secretary" (slottssekreterar) Ericus Benedicti Schroderus (Erik Benedict Schroder), a brother of Lars Bengtsson Skytte and Johan Skytte. His new wife had previously been married to Sveno Jonae Westrogothus, a professor at Uppsala University. All the children of the second marriage died in infancy but the first marriage bore fifteen children, including daughters married to the Leijel, Gyldenbring and Silfverström families.

A son, Jacob, was smothered to death by his nurse. Three other sons were married. The son Claes Edenberg was a shipyard master (holmmajor), who married to Ms. Rosenfelt, with whom he had two daughters, who married to the Mentzer and Stålhandske families. Mathias Edenberg (1640–1709) was a legation secretary in England and the Netherlands. His first marriage was with Ms. Lilljemarck, but his only children came from his second marriage with Ms. Clo, whose mother's family was Björnklou.

Mathias Edenberg's only son died in infancy, but he also had two daughters. The daughter Catharina was married to Mathias' relative on the mother's side, Jakob Benzelius, the Archbishop of Uppsala. Catharina's younger sister was engaged to marry the archbishop's brother Gustaf Benzelstierna, but – according to Gabriel Anrep – "allowed herself to be laid by a rider" (lät under tiden lägra sig af en Ryttare) for which she was however pardoned by the King of Sweden, Frederick I.

Claes and Mathias Edenberg's brother Herman Edenberg was a district judge who died childless. The dynasty, therefore, ended in 1715 with the death of Herman Edenberg, without any male heirs left. In modern times, the surname has resurfaced, however, by 50 persons in Sweden as of 2014, with no known connection to the afore-described noble family.
