= Birger Gregersson =

Archbishop of Uppsala from 1366 to 1383

- Archbishop of Uppsala; Primate of Sweden
- Church: Roman Catholic
- Archdiocese: Uppsala
- Appointed: 1366
- In office: 1366–1383
- Predecessor: Petrus Torkilsson
- Successor: Henrik Karlsson

Orders
- Rank: Metropolitan Archbishop

Personal details
- Born: c. 1327 Uppland, Sweden
- Died: 10 March 1383 Mälaren, Sweden
- Parents: Greger Johansson av Malstaätten

Birger Gregersson (Latin: Birgerus Gregorii; c. 1327 – 11 March 1383) was Archbishop of Uppsala from 1366 until his death 1383.

== Biography ==
Birger Gregersson was probably born the son of Greger Jonsson av Malstaätten of Norrtälje-Malsta parish in Uppland.

He was vicar of Österhaninge and then priest in Uppsala. He was canon of Strängnäs Cathedral from 1342 and dean of Uppsala Cathedral from 1356. He was a supporter of King Albrekt (c. 1338 – 1412) who appointed him chancellor. In 1365, Birger Gregersson is mentioned in the Diplomatarium Fennicum. In 1366, Birger Gregersson was elected archbishop of Uppsala diocese. He is considered one of the most important Swedish writers in the Middle Ages.

He wrote a biography of Saint Birgitta (c. 1303 – 1373) and hymns to her and in honor of 12th-century missionary Saint Botvid (died ca 1120).

== See also ==
- List of archbishops of Uppsala

== Other sources ==
- Birger Gregersson Nordisk familjebok
