= Irsta =

- Location within Västmanland Location within Sweden
- Coordinates: 59°36′N 16°42′E
- Country: Sweden
- Province: Västmanland
- County: Västmanland County
- Municipality: Västerås Municipality

Area
  - Total: 1.62 km^{2} (0.63 sq mi)

Population (31 December 2010)
  - Total: 2,717
  - Density: 1,679/km^{2} (4,350/sq mi)
- Time zone: UTC+1 (CET)
  - Summer (DST): UTC+2 (CEST)

Irsta is a locality situated in Västerås Municipality, Västmanland County, Sweden with 2,717 inhabitants in 2010.
