= Jacob Benzelius =

Swedish bishop and archbishop

The Most Reverend Jakob Benzelius
- Archbishop of Uppsala; Primate of Sweden
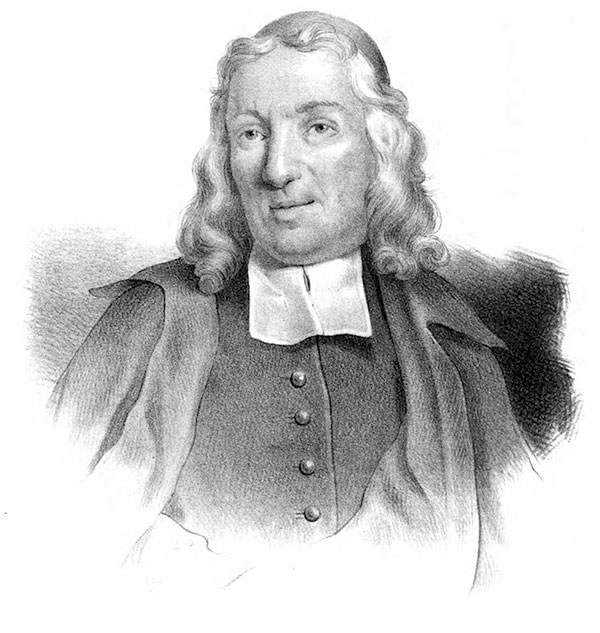
- Church: Church of Sweden
- Archdiocese: Uppsala
- Appointed: 1744
- In office: 1744–1747
- Predecessor: Erik Benzelius the younger
- Successor: Henric Benzelius
- Previous post: Bishop of Gothenburg (1731–1744)

Orders
- Consecration: 1731
- Rank: Metropolitan Archbishop

Personal details
- Born: 25 February 1683 Uppsala, Sweden
- Died: 19 June 1747 (aged 64) Stockholm, Sweden
- Buried: Uppsala Cathedral
- Parents: Erik Benzelius the elder Margaretha Odhelia
- Spouse: Catharina Edenberg
- Education: Uppsala University

Jakob Benzelius (25 February 1683 in Uppsala – 29 June 1747) was Archbishop of Uppsala in the Church of Sweden from 1744 to his death.

== Biography ==
Jakob Benzelius was the son of Archbishop Erik Benzelius the Elder (1632–1714) and Margaretha Odhelia (1653–1693). He studied at Uppsala University, graduated as filosofie magister (M.A.) in 1703. He became a lecturer of philosophy and theologically at Uppsala. He became church pastor in the parish of Näs in Västergötland followed by several years visiting foreign universities. He was professor of theology at Lund University 1718–1731. He was appointed Doctor of Theology in 1725, Bishop of Gothenburg 1731–1744 and succeeded his elder brother Erik Benzelius the Younger (1675–1743) as Archbishop of Uppsala in 1744. He was succeeded as Archbishop by his younger brother Henric Benzelius (1689–1758).

Jacob Benzelius wrote several influential books on theology. He was married to Catharina Edenberg, daughter of diplomat Mattias Edenberg (1640–1709).

== See also ==
- List of Archbishops of Uppsala

== Other sources ==
- Nordisk Familjebok (1878), article Jakob Benzelius In Swedish

Preceded by --	Bishop of Gothenburg; 1731–1744	Succeeded by --
Preceded by Erik Benzelius	Archbishop of Uppsala; 1744–1747	Succeeded by Henrik Benzelius
