= Petrus Kenicius =

Swedish Archbishop

The Most Reverend Petrus Kenicius
- Archbishop of Uppsala; Primate of Sweden
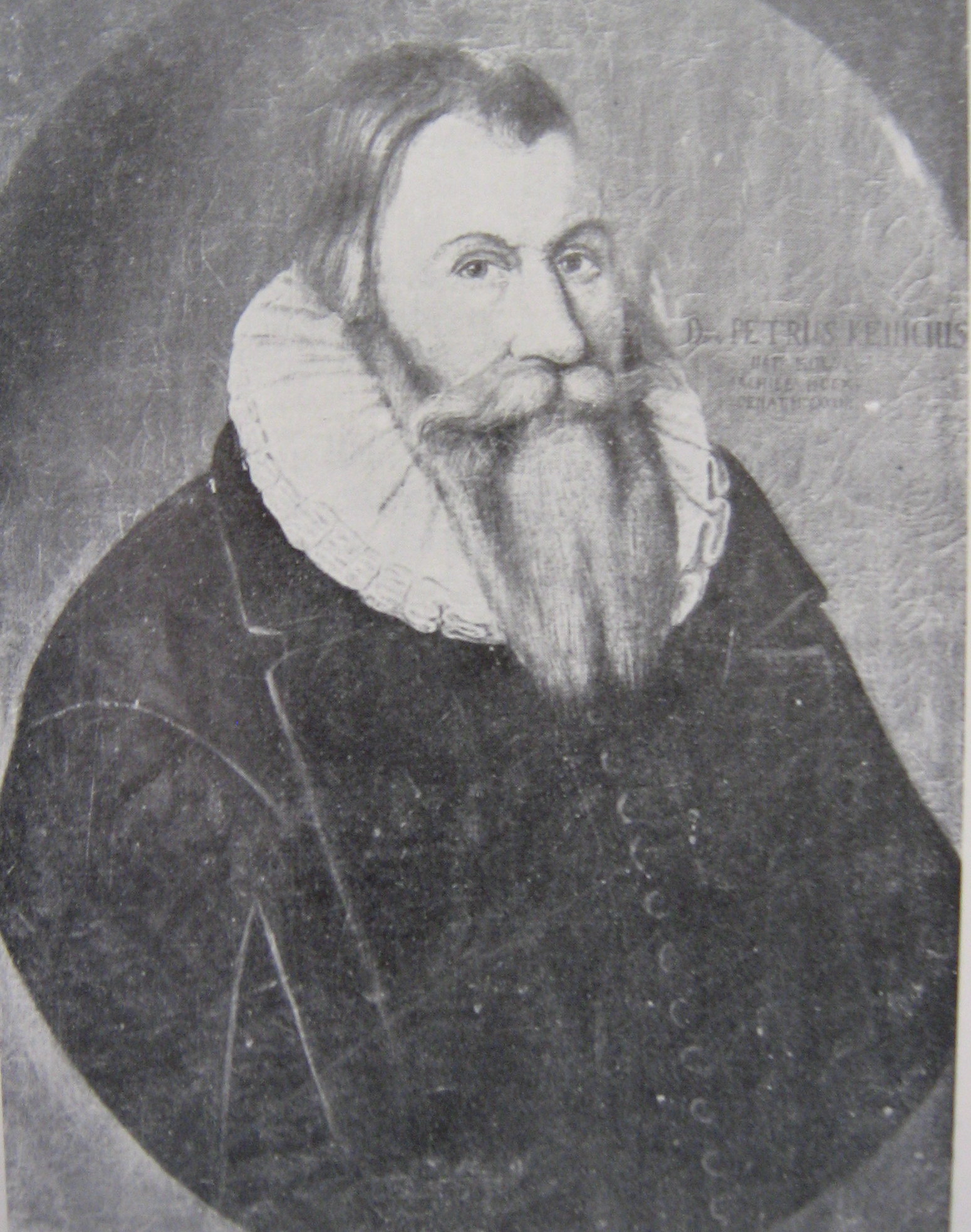
- Church: Church of Sweden
- Archdiocese: Uppsala
- Appointed: 1609
- In office: 1609–1636
- Predecessor: Olaus Martini
- Successor: Laurentius Paulinus Gothus
- Previous posts: Bishop of Skara (1595–1608); Bishop of Strängnäs (1608)

Orders
- Consecration: 26 October 1595 by Abraham Angermannus
- Rank: Metropolitan Archbishop

Personal details
- Born: 1555 Baggböle, Sweden
- Died: 3 February 1636 (aged 80–81) Uppsala, Sweden
- Buried: Strängnäs Cathedral
- Parents: König Olofsson; Anna Olofsdotter
- Spouse: Margareta Hansdotter
- Children: Katarina Kenicia; Margareta Kenicia; Anna Kenicia; Johan Kenicius; König Kenicius; König Kenicius; Barbro Kenicia; Elisabeth Kenicia

Petrus Kenicius (1555 – 3 February 1636) was Archbishop of Uppsala in the Church of Sweden from 1609 to his death.

He got his education from the Universities of Wittenberg and Rostock.

In 1589 he was put in prison by King John III of Sweden, together with, among others, Nicolaus Olai Bothniensis who would become archbishop in 1599–1600. The reason were disagreements with the King's non-Lutheran liturgy.

After being released, he was at the Uppsala Synod in 1593 as one of the twelve assessors. And in 1595 he was ordained Bishop of Skara.

He was considered a fine and hardworking person who dedicated much time and care to the University in Uppsala and the Church. In his old age, he was weakened by age and sickness and the archdiocese was said to have been neglected.

== See also ==
- List of Archbishops of Uppsala
