= Hans-Jörg Fecht =

German scientist

Hans-Jörg Fecht is Chaired Professor at the University of Ulm, Germany in the departments of Engineering and Computer Science. He is also an Office Director of the EUREKA Cluster Metallurgy Europe in the Same university, and a member of the European Academy of Sciences and Arts.

== Education ==
Fecht was born on 8 March 1957 in Germany. He Graduated in Materials Science at the University of Saarbrucken in 1981, followed by his Ph.D. in Materials Science at the same university supervised by Prof. H. Gleiter.

== Research and career ==
Fecht's research interests include non-crystalline and Nanocrystalline materials, non-conventional semiconductors, interface engineering, nanoengineering, electrical engineering materials characterization Optimization of functional materials and layer architectures & micro-structural, electrical, chemical, mechanical, and tri-bological properties.

Fecht is presently a Chaired Professor of Engineering and Computer Science at the University of Ulm, Germany. Before obtaining his current role, he was a Post-Doctoral Research Associate in the University of Wisconsin–Madison, USA in the Department of Materials Science and Engineering and Senior Research Associate at the California Institute of Technology, Pasadena, USA in the Same Department.

== Publications ==
- Nanocrystalline metals prepared by high-energy ball milling.
- Structural and thermodynamic properties of heavily mechanically deformed Ru and AlRu.
- The mechanism of formation of nanostructure and dissolution of cementite in a pearlitic steel during high pressure torsion.
- Containerless processing in the study of metallic melts and their solidification.
- Entropy and enthalpy catastrophe as a stability limit for crystalline material.
