= Christopherus Stephani Bellinus =

Swedish priest (died 1607)

Christopherus Stephani Bellinus (died 1607 in Irsta, Västmanland County) was a Swedish priest, and Member of the Clergy of the Riksdag of the Estates of Sweden.

== Biography ==
Christopherus Stephani Bellinus was a brother of Bishop Olaus Stephani Bellinus, among others. A daughter of Christopherus Bellinus was married to Samuel Olai Normontanus.

Christopherus Bellinus was appointed Chaplain at the Royal Court of Sweden in 1579, and vicar in Irsta in 1586.

Bellinus participated in the Uppsala Synod in 1593, and signed its documentation. He served as Member of the Clergy of the Riksdag of the Estates of Sweden in 1594, as one of the signing participants in support of the throne pretendence of King Sigismund.

== Sources ==
- Ihrsta
