= Henric Benzelius =

Swedish bishop and archbishop

The Most Reverend Henric Benzelius
- Archbishop of Uppsala; Primate of Sweden
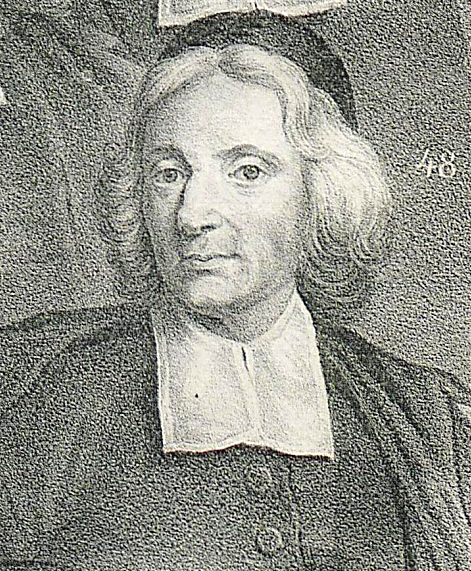
- Church: Church of Sweden
- Archdiocese: Uppsala
- Appointed: 1747
- In office: 1747–1758
- Predecessor: Jakob Benzelius
- Successor: Samuel Troilius
- Previous post: Bishop of Lund (1740-1747)

Orders
- Consecration: 1740 by Johannes Steuchius
- Rank: Metropolitan Archbishop

Personal details
- Born: 7 August 1689 Strängnäs, Sweden
- Died: 20 May 1758 (aged 68) Uppsala, Sweden
- Buried: Uppland
- Parents: Erik Benzelius the elder Margaretha Odhelia
- Spouse: Emerentia Rudenschöld
- Education: Uppsala University

Henrik Benzelius (7 August 1689 in Strängnäs – 20 May 1758) was Bishop of Lund from 1744 to 1747, and Archbishop of Uppsala in the Church of Sweden from 1747 to his death.

== Biography ==
He was predeceased as Archbishop of Uppsala by his father Erik Benzelius the Elder as well as by his elder brothers Erik Benzelius the younger and Jacob Benzelius. Benzelius was one of the people sent by Charles XII of Sweden to the Middle East, travelling to Egypt and Syria. After returning for a time he took up a post in Lund University. He was elected a member of the Royal Swedish Academy of Sciences in 1746.

== See also ==
- List of Archbishops of Uppsala
- Minuscule 400 – one of his manuscripts

== Other sources ==
- Nordisk Familjebok, article Henrik Benzelius In Swedish
- "The Swedish Connection". Saudi Aramco World. January–February 1987. pp. 24–27.

Preceded by Carl Papke	Bishop of Lund; 1744–1747	Succeeded by Johan Engeström
Preceded by Jakob Benzelius	Archbishop of Uppsala; 1747–1758	Succeeded by Samuel Troilius
