= Olaus Martini =

Swedish Archbishop

The Most Reverend Olaus Martini
- Archbishop of Uppsala; Primate of Sweden
- Church: Church of Sweden
- Archdiocese: Uppsala
- Appointed: 1601
- In office: 1601–1609
- Predecessor: Nicolaus Olai Bothniensis
- Successor: Petrus Kenicius

Orders
- Consecration: 16 August 1601 by Petrus Kenicius
- Rank: Metropolitan Archbishop

Personal details
- Born: 1557 Uppsala, Sweden
- Died: 17 March 1609 (aged 51–52) Uppsala, Sweden
- Parents: Martinus Olai Gestricius; Kristina Månsdotter

Olof Mårtensson (1557 – 17 March 1609), also known by the Latin form Olaus Martini, was Archbishop of Uppsala from 1601 to his death.

Born in Uppsala, Sweden, he first enrolled in the University of Uppsala, but when it was temporarily closed in 1578, he travelled abroad. In 1583, he received his master's degree at the University of Rostock and then travelled home again.

On returning, he made a reputation for himself when he criticized the liturgy of Swedish King John III, who held somewhat Catholic beliefs despite Sweden having been Lutheran since 1531.

The king's brother, Duke Charles, who later became King Charles IX, promoted Olaus to Archbishop of Uppsala in 1601. Despite his support, Martini was fundamentally in opposition to the beliefs of Duke Charles, a conflict which eventually led to disputes between the two. Martini was an orthodox Lutheran, while Duke Charles is believed to have been inclined towards Calvinistic tenets—which he himself denied (see: crypto-Calvinism).

In 1606, Martini had a text published which was sharply polemising against Catholic and Calvinistic tenets.

Although he was in opposition to the king and the duke, he was considered a hard-working and trustworthy man by the University of Uppsala and by his community.

== See also ==
- List of Archbishops of Uppsala
