= Nicolaus Olai Bothniensis =

Swedish archbishop (1550–1600)

The Most Reverend Nicolaus Olai Bothniensis
- Archbishop of Uppsala; Primate of Sweden
- Church: Church of Sweden
- Archdiocese: Uppsala
- Appointed: 1599
- In office: 1599–1600
- Predecessor: Abraham Angermannus
- Successor: Olaus Martini

Orders
- Consecration: Not Consecrated
- Rank: Metropolitan Archbishop

Personal details
- Born: c. 1550 Piteå, Sweden
- Died: 18 May 1600 (aged 49–50) Stockholm, Sweden
- Parents: Olai Bothniensis
- Spouse: Elisabet Grubb

Nicolaus Olai Bothniensis (c. 1550 – 18 May 1600) was Archbishop of Uppsala in the Church of Sweden 1599–1600. He was appointed in place of Abraham Angermannus who had been put in prison, but before getting inducted he died of a sickness, about 50 years old.

In his younger days he had been a student at the University of Rostock and had made extensive travels through Europe.

Like Angermannus, Bothniensis had for a while been imprisoned because of his resistance to King John III of Sweden's non-Lutheran liturgy, but he had been finally released in the fall of 1592 after a total time of 1,5 years.

He became dean in Uppsala and the first professor of theology at the university there in 1593. Bothiensis was described as a fine man of high moral standards.

== See also ==
- List of Archbishops of Uppsala
