= Erik Benzelius the Elder =

Swedish bishop and archbishop

The Most Reverend Erik Benzelius den äldre
- Archbishop of Uppsala; Primate of Sweden
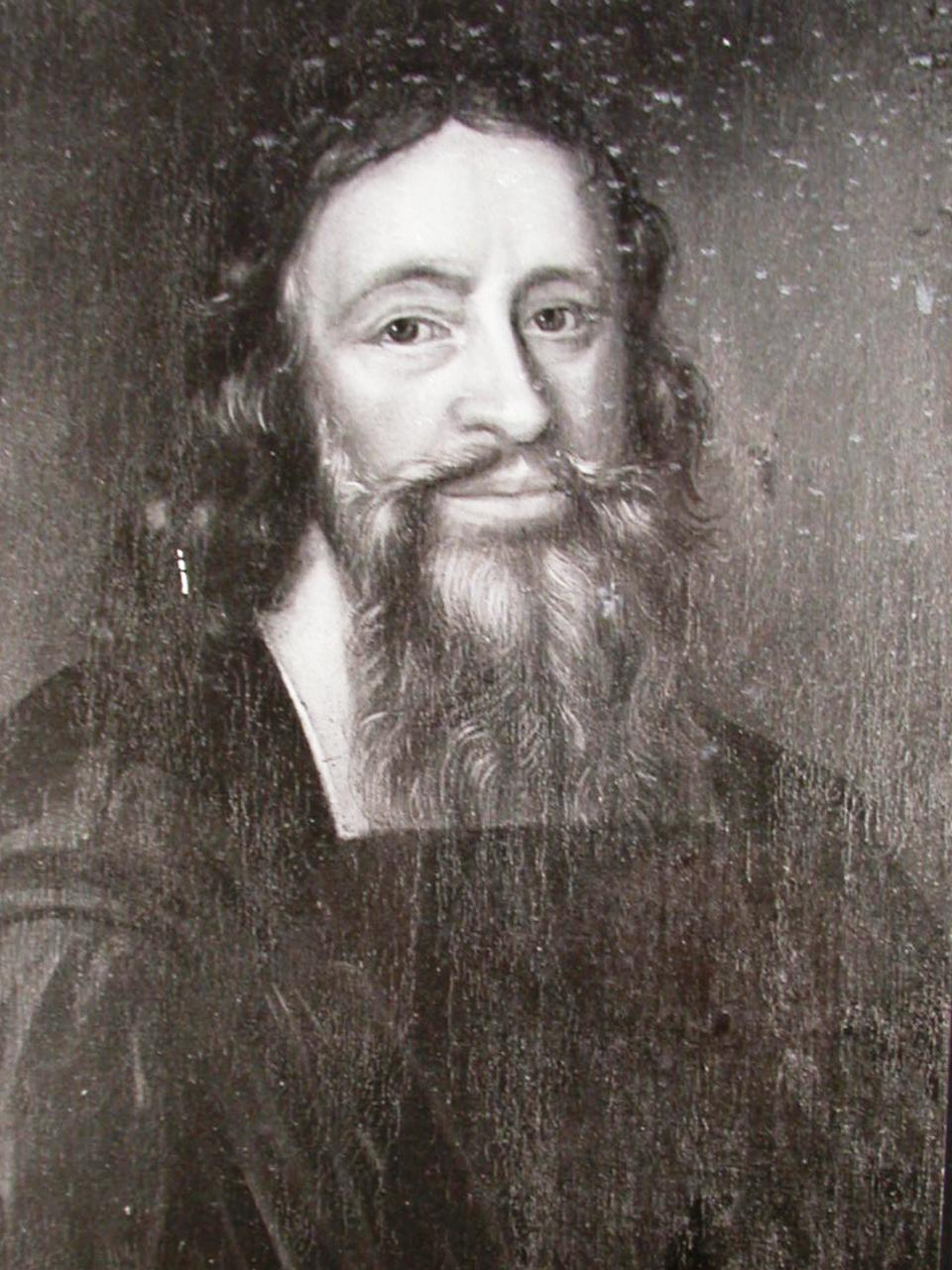
- Church: Church of Sweden
- Archdiocese: Uppsala
- Appointed: 29 September 1700
- In office: 1700–1709
- Predecessor: Olov Svebilius
- Successor: Haquin Spegel
- Previous post: Bishop of Strängnäs (1687–1700)

Orders
- Consecration: 7 January 1687
- Rank: Metropolitan Archbishop

Personal details
- Born: 16 December 1632 Luleå, Sweden
- Died: 17 February 1709 (aged 76) Uppsala, Sweden
- Buried: Uppsala Cathedral
- Denomination: Lutheran
- Parents: Henrik Jakobsson; Margareta Jonsdotter
- Spouse: Margaretha Odhelia (1668–1693); Anna Mackeij (1695–1709)
- Children: Margareta Benzelia; Christina Benzelia; Erik Benzelius the younger Olof Benzelstierna; Lars Benzelstierna; Jakob Benzelius; Nils Benzelstierna; Gustaf Benzelstierna; Henric Benzelius
- Education: Uppsala University

Erik Benzelius the Elder (16 December 1632 – 17 February 1709) was a Swedish theologian and Archbishop of Uppsala.

Benzelius was born at the Bentseby farm in the parish of Luleå in northern Sweden, son of the farmer and lay assessor (nämndeman) Henrik Jakobsson. He took a family name derived from his birthplace, rather than using the patronymic as was common in the Swedish peasantry. He was raised by a relative who was a merchant in Uppsala, and studied at Uppsala University, where he completed his filosofie magister degree in 1661.

He was hired by Magnus Gabriel De la Gardie as a tutor for his sons in 1660 and accompanied one of them on a foreign journey stretching from 1663 to 1665, visiting Copenhagen, the most important universities of Germany, and continuing to Paris, London, Oxford, and Leiden.

Returning to Uppsala, he was appointed professor extraordinary of history and moral philosophy in 1665, of theology in 1666, and 1670 ordinary professor of theology. He became bishop of Strängnäs in 1687, and succeeded Olov Svebilius in 1700 as Archbishop of Uppsala.

He took an important part in the various ecclesiastical committees active during the reigns of Charles XI and Charles XII, such as that concerning the new Church Law of 1686, the new Psalm Book of 1695 and the new Bible translation. In the Bible translation committee, created on the initiative of Jesper Swedberg, Benzelius was a conservative force, and is largely responsible for the fact that the so-called Charles XII's Bible ended up as nothing more than a revision of the Swedish Reformation Bible.

Benzelius was a typical representative of 17th-century Swedish Lutheran orthodoxy, was careful not to deviate from established theological principles, and lacked originality in his writing. Nevertheless, he was a productive author of works in theology, and his work on church history was used as a textbook for the following century.

Of the seven sons of Benzelius, three later were appointed archbishops of Uppsala, one after the other: Erik (1675–1743, appointed 1742, but died before taking office), Jakob (1683–1747, archbishop from 1744), and Henrik (1689–1758, archbishop from 1747).

== See also ==
- List of Archbishops of Uppsala
