= Petrus Michaelis Fecht =

Swedish theologian (died 1576)

Peter Michaelis Fecht (died 1576) was a Swedish theologian.

After studies at Wittenberg had Fecht service with the Swedish king Johan III. He shared the king's view that a balance between Catholicism and Lutheranism should be done.

During a trip to Rome Fecht drowned in a shipwreck off the island of Bornholm.
