= Erik Benzelius the Younger =

Swedish bishop and archbishop

The Most Reverend Erik Benzelius den yngre
- Archbishop of Uppsala; Primate of Sweden
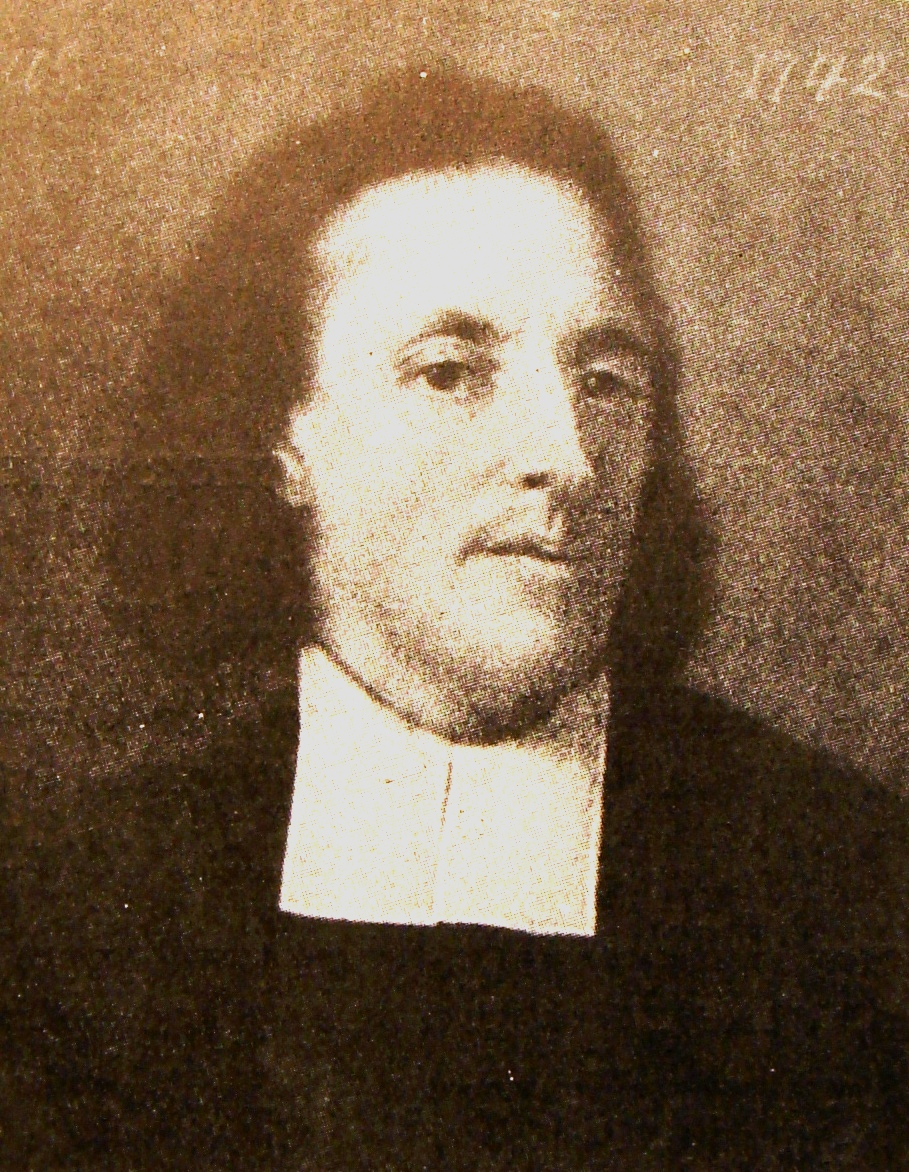
- Church: Church of Sweden
- Archdiocese: Uppsala
- Appointed: 1742
- In office: 1742–1743
- Predecessor: Johannes Steuchius
- Successor: Jakob Benzelius
- Previous posts: Bishop of Gothenburg (1726–1731); Bishop of Linköping (1731–1742)

Orders
- Ordination: 4 June 1709 by Jesper Swedberg
- Consecration: 5 June 1726 by Mathias Steuchius
- Rank: Metropolitan Archbishop

Personal details
- Born: 27 January 1675 Uppsala, Sweden
- Died: 23 September 1743 (aged 68) Linköping, Sweden
- Buried: Linköping Cathedral
- Parents: Erik Benzelius the elder Margaretha Odhelia
- Spouse: Anna Svedenborg
- Children: 10

Erik Benzelius the Younger (27 January 1675 – 23 September 1743) was a priest, theologian, librarian, Bishop of Linköping, 1731–1742 and Archbishop of Uppsala, Sweden, 1742–1743. He was a highly learned man and one of Sweden's important Enlightenment figures.

== Biography ==
He was the son of Erik Benzelius the elder. The elder Erik also held the office of archbishop, he was a most learned man who had studied in universities around Europe and he was also a professor of theology at the University of Uppsala.

Like his father, the young Erik first studied at Uppsala and in 1697 with a Royal scholarship undertook a three year long educational journey through Europe. The academic world had grown in importance as had the sciences, and many notable people were found at the universities in Europe. Erik met among others Leibniz and Malebranche. He also spent a great deal of time studying books and scripts from large, old libraries. He bought or copied several of them.

Returning to Uppsala in 1700, he was appointed librarian at the University of Uppsala. He was fond of books and worked to expand the library's collection. Then he studied to be a priest and was ordained in 1709. He also constantly kept in contact with learned men from Europe and in Uppsala. These included botanists, mathematicians, historians and scientists of other faculties. The correspondence have been kept and were published after his death.

Benzelius married Anna Svedberg in 1703. She was daughter of the Swedish clergyman Jesper Swedberg and sister of the scientist (and later mystic) Emanuel Swedenborg. Erik was a benefactor of Emanuel, and perhaps the only person to pay due respect to his scientific discoveries. Erik was a supporter of all kinds of knowledge and discoveries. There is also evidence to suggest that he had contact with Johan Kemper a Kabbalist and Jewish convert to Christianity who also worked at the University of Uppsala. Some scholars see Kemper as a possible source for apparent Kabbalistic influences on Swedenborg's thought.

Benzelius' theology was marked by his father's orthodox beliefs and he wrote and published several books in theology, as well as in different sciences. For instance, he was the founder of the first scientific magazine in Sweden, Acta literaria Suecia, which existed from 1720 to 1739.

He was also an active member of the Swedish parliament, the Riksdag of the Estates, from 1723 to his death. And he was generally described as being interested in anything that might benefit his country.

In the Riksdag of 1738, he handed a letter of protest from the delegation from the Clergy Estate to Frederick I of Sweden, protesting of the monarch's adultery with Hedvig Taube: he was involved when the matter was raised again during the Riksdag of 1741.

He was elected a member of the Royal Swedish Academy of Sciences in 1740, and was its president in 1743.

== See also ==
- List of Archbishops of Uppsala
