= Laurentius Petri =

Swedish clergyman (1499–1573)

The Most Reverend Laurentius Petri Nericius
- Archbishop of Uppsala; Primate of Sweden
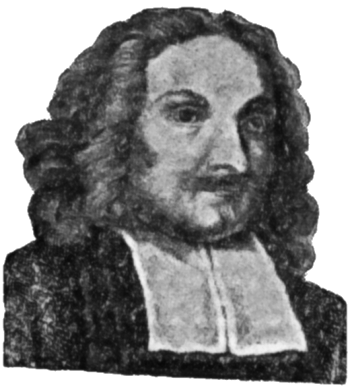
- Svenskt Biografiskt Handlexikon, 1905
- Native name: Lars Petersson från Närke
- Church: Church of Sweden
- Archdiocese: Uppsala
- Province: Sweden
- Elected: August 1531
- In office: 1531–1573
- Predecessor: Olaus Magnus
- Successor: Laurentius Petri Gothus

Orders
- Ordination: by Synod in 1531
- Consecration: 22 September 1531 by Peder Månsson
- Rank: Metropolitan Archbishop

Personal details
- Born: Lars; 1499 Örebro, Sweden
- Died: 26 October 1573 (aged 73–74) Uppsala, Sweden
- Buried: Uppsala Cathedral
- Denomination: Church of Sweden
- Residence: Uppsala
- Parents: Peter Olofsson; Kristina Larsdotter
- Spouse: Elizabeth Didriksdotter
- Children: Margaret, Magdalene
- Occupation: Archbishop
- Profession: Schoolmaster
- Education: theological
- Alma mater: Martin Luther University of Halle-Wittenberg

Laurentius Petri Nericius or Lars Petersson från Närke (1499 – 27 October 1573) was a Swedish clergyman and the first Evangelical Lutheran Archbishop of Sweden. He and his brother Olaus Petri are, together with King Gustav Vasa, regarded as the main Lutheran reformers of Sweden. They are commemorated by the Evangelical Lutheran Church in America on 19 April.

== Early life ==
Laurentius was born Lars Persson in Örebro, Närke. Laurentius studied in Germany in 1520, possibly together with his brother. There they were influenced by the church reform movement, meeting Martin Luther himself. On returning home to Stockholm, they became stranded and nearly lost their lives as their boat went ashore on the island of Gotland. However, they both survived and settled on the island, Laurentius becoming a schoolmaster and Olaus assistant to a priest. Not long after, Olaus travelled with the priest to Stockholm and attended the coronation of the Swedish King Gustav Vasa. Subsequently, he entered into friendly terms with the King, and soon moved permanently to Stockholm, where he worked in the vicinity of the King.

== Archbishop ==
At the Uppsala Council of 1531, King Gustav Vasa took the final step of breaking with the Roman Catholic Church by personally appointing Laurentius as the new archbishop. On 22 September that year, Laurentius was consecrated archbishop by Peder Månsson, Bishop of Västerås. Since Månsson had been consecrated as bishop in Rome by Bishop Paris de Grassis, by Månsson's consecrating Laurentius the apostolic succession was retained in the Church of Sweden, which was traditionally considered important. However, though the consecration took place according to Catholic ritual, those who officiated at the consecration made a secret declaration that they were acting under duress.

Later that same year, Laurentius married Elisabeth Didriksdotter, a daughter of the King's cousin becoming the first Swedish archbishop to be married. His brother Olaus had already become the first priest to marry in 1525.

The king forbade Laurentius to interfere with the reformation plans. However, Laurentius defended the autonomy of the Church against various ideas espoused by the king, such as his wish to abolish all bishops, while still steadily advancing and promoting the ideas of the Reformation texts within Sweden. Laurentius' main contribution consisted in his abundant writings, which laid the foundations for the Swedish Church Ordinance established at the Uppsala Council 1571.

He was archbishop for 42 years, a fact unparalleled in Swedish history, and during that period was often in conflict with the monarch. In 1539 his brother Olaus was sentenced to death by the King over some arguments, and Laurentius was among those forced to sign the death sentence. It has been disputed whether Laurentius did this because of a weak character or because he thought it better to formally obey so that he could continue to spread the ideas of the Reformation. As it happened, Olaus was eventually pardoned in 1542, largely owing to his influential friends. However, he was forced to keep a low profile, thus leaving the role of main reformer to Laurentius alone.

== Diplomat ==
Gustav I of Sweden entrusted Laurentius Petri to head the delegation that negotiated the Treaty of Novgorod (1557), which ended the Russo-Swedish War (1554–1557).

== Works ==
The first complete Swedish translation of the Bible was published in 1541, nicknamed the Vasa Bible after the King. Laurentius was one of the main proponents supervising the project, together with his brother Olaus and the clergyman Laurentius Andreae.

In the 1560s, when the ideas of Calvin gained influence, Laurentius published several texts where he spoke for Lutheranism. It has been suggested that it was the first time the Swedish Church defined its Lutheran character.

== Family ==
His wife was Elizabeth Didriksdotter, daughter of Didrik the Master of the Mint and Birgitta Kristiernsdotter Vasa (paternal cousin of Gustav I of Sweden). They were betrothed on 23 September 1531, after Laurentius Petri had officiated at the marriage of Gustav I of Sweden to Catherine of Saxe-Lauenburg. The marriage produced two daughters: Margaret, who married Laurentius Petri Gothus (they had two daughters) and Magdalene, who married Abraham Angermannus.

== Notes and references ==
The standard reference works in English remain:

- Yelverton, Eric E., An Archbishop of the Reformation: Laurentius Petri Nericus, Archbishop of Uppsala, 1531-73 (Augsburg Publishing House, Minneapolis, MN, 1959),

- Bergendoff, Conrad, Olavus Petri and the Ecclesiastical Transformation in Sweden, 1521-1552 (Fortress Press, Philadelphia, PA, 1965),

- Grell, Ole Peter (editor), The Scandinavian Reformation: From evangelical movement to institutionalisation of reform (Cambridge University Press, 1995).

- Article Laurentius Petri in Nordisk familjebok (1911)
