= Abraham Angermannus =

Swedish archbishop (1540–1607)

The Most Reverend Abrahamus Angermannus
- Archbishop of Uppsala; Primate of Sweden
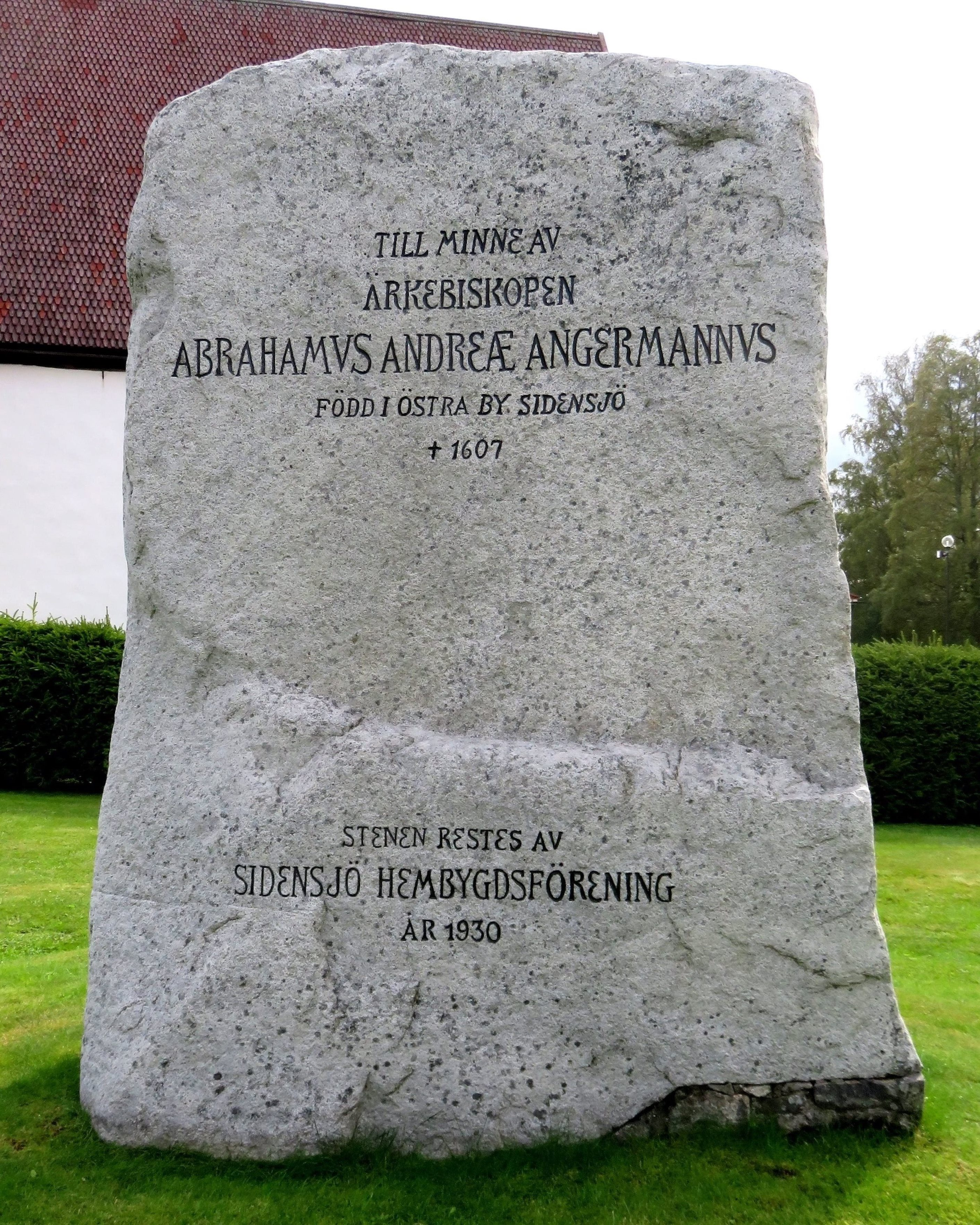
- Church: Church of Sweden
- Archdiocese: Uppsala
- Appointed: 1593
- In office: 1593–1599
- Predecessor: Andreas Laurentii Björnram
- Successor: Nicolaus Olai Bothniensis

Orders
- Consecration: 19 February 1594 by Petrus Benedicti
- Rank: Metropolitan Archbishop

Personal details
- Born: 1540 Sidensjö, Sweden
- Died: December 1607 (aged 66–67) Gripsholm Castle, Mariefred, Sweden

Abraham Andersson, better known by his Latin name, Abrahamus Andreæ Angermannus or simply Abraham Angermannus (died in October 1607) was the fourth Lutheran Archbishop of Uppsala in the Church of Sweden from 1593 to 1599. He was described as bold and outspoken.

== Biography ==
Angermannus was born around 1540 in the province of Ångermanland, Sweden, whence his name is derived.

In 1576 he was appointed school principal at a school in Stockholm. But because of his criticism towards the liturgy of King John III of Sweden, John tried to get him to move somewhere else. After turning down the offer of becoming professor at Uppsala University, Angermannus was forced to become vicar in the remote city Öregrund. Still polemizing, the king then moved him again to an even remoter area, to Saltvik on the island Åland.

This did not silence him. In his preachings he spoke sharply against papism and liturgy until eventually John sent some men to arrest him and he was taken to the prison in Åbo (Turku), Finland. With some help he managed to escape, and got on a boat back to Stockholm to the king's brother Duke Charles with whom he thought himself secure. But he was nonetheless prosecuted in Stockholm. With help from Duke Charles, he in 1582 escaped on a boat to Charles sister Elisabeth in Mecklenburg, Germany, to avoid the trial.

In Germany he lived for eleven years. He visited the universities of Wittenberg, Leipzig and Frankfurt. All the time he spoke heavily against liturgy and papism and Duke Charles was supporting him from Sweden as much as he could. In Germany he had published books such as Proposition about our Swedish Church Doctrines and Rites in Swedish 1587 and Historia Liturgica in 1588. It led to him being considered a martyr and a strongman for the true Lutheran faith. For these reasons the chapter of Uppsala elected him archbishop in 1593, although neither the Duke Charles nor the present king Sigismund were in favor of it.

He was the person in charge of the Uppsala Synod in 1593, where the main doctrines of the Swedish Lutheran Church and the privileges for the Uppsala University were decided.

In 1596 he undertook an inspection through his diocese. During the travel he was so harshly changing the remainders of the Catholic Church rituals he did not approve of that he was almost attacked by the peasants. His intent was to purge the country from everything which did not answer to the Lutheran doctrine, including everything from old Catholic and Pagan customs to sex outside of marriage; it also caused the first wave of witch trials in Sweden, though they did not lead to any death sentences. The Duke Charles, who had by now been crowned as Charles IX, got upset by the agitations from the archbishop. After the archbishop had undertaken some other actions that the king did not approve of, the king put him on trial for not doing his duty in 1599. In spite of the bishops' refusal to admit him guilty, the king decided that he was indeed so, and had him imprisoned. Eventually he was transferred to Gripsholm prison where he remained until his death in October 1607.

== See also ==
- List of Archbishops of Uppsala
