= Jesper Swedberg =

Swedish hymnwriter (1653-1735)

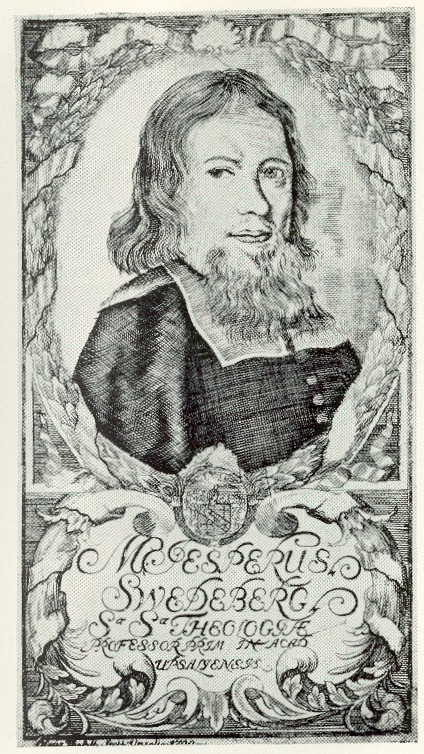
- Jesper Swedberg. Engraving from 1700 by Hans Thelott.
- Church: Church of Sweden
- Diocese: Diocese of Skara
- Installed: 1702
- Term ended: 1735

Orders
- Ordination: 1675

Personal details
- Born: 28 August 1653 Falun, Sweden
- Died: 26 July 1735 (aged 81) Skara, Sweden
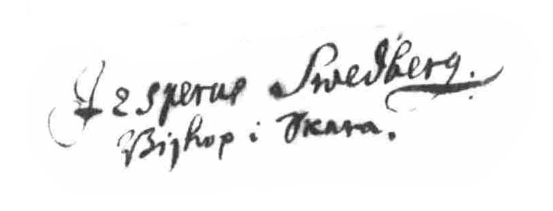
- Signature

Jesper Swedberg (28 August 1653 (O.S)–26 July 1735 (N.S)) was a bishop of Skara, Sweden. He was one of Sweden's most notable churchmen. He published the first edition ever of a Swedish book of hymns in 1694, and was the father of scientist and mystic Emanuel Swedenborg.

== Early life ==
Jesper Swedberg was born as the son of a bergsman (owner of a farm privileged with mining rights) and his wife, daughter of a pastor, in Falun Municipality. His family were observant members of the Church of Sweden. In 1669, he enrolled in theology at the University of Lund in 1669, intending to become a minister. In 1674, he attended the University of Uppsala, where he undertook further study to become ordained.

In 1683, he married. For two years, he travelled through Europe. In Sweden, he had learnt much theory. In Europe, he observed many Christian practises. Among them were the traditions of Roman Catholicism in France, and the Pietist movement in Hamburg, Germany.

Returning to Stockholm, he gave sermons, influenced by what he had seen in Europe. His outspokenness and honesty impressed the Swedish King Charles XI, who made him court chaplain.

== Working for the Church and Crown ==
In 1686, Swedberg was entrusted with the task of creating a Book of Hymns. In 1692, he was placed in charge of a new Swedish Bible translation. The first edition ever of a Swedish book of hymns was printed in 1694. This is today known as Swedberg's Book of Hymns. Shortly after publication, the hymnal was deemed heretical on the grounds it emphasised works over faith. The whole edition was revoked. Some copies were sent to Swedish colonies overseas, however, such as to New Sweden, Delaware.

In 1695, a new edition was published. Of the circa 500 hymns, 30 bore Swedberg's name, either as the author or as the translator. Several of these are still in the modern Swedish Book of Hymns.

While doing this work, he lived in Stockholm, the capital of Sweden. This was also the birthplace of most of his children, of whom the most famous today is Emanuel Swedenborg, who was born in 1688 as the second son.

The Bible translation turned out to be a futile labour, as churchmen said they did not have time to check the translation, claiming sarcastically that they were too busy looking over a certain Book of Hymns. It was decided to print an older translation instead, which was done in 1703. This edition, known as Charles XII's Bible, is still renowned in Sweden today.

After having finished this tedious work, Swedberg was appointed professor of theology at the University of Uppsala in 1695. Shortly thereafter, in 1702, he was also appointed bishop of Skara.

== Professor and bishop ==
As a bishop, Swedberg took a special interest in the lost souls over in Delaware, and appointed several priests to go and live there, and he wrote letters and sermons to them.

As Swedberg was writing so much, he began to take a special interest in the Swedish language. At the end of the 17th century, he made several contributions to the ongoing debate about the Swedish language. Swedberg advocated that the orthodox Swedish grammar was to be preserved as much as possible, and was patriotic concerning the language which he believed had an ancient history. But once again, his views were largely disregarded by the establishment. He nonetheless manifested his ideas in a combined book of grammar and dictionary, published in 1716.

In 1719 he and his children were ennobled by Queen Ulrika Eleonora of Sweden, for his services.

In those days the wooden buildings of cities were subject to disastrous fires, and Uppsala was no exception. In Uppsala, Swedberg's house burned down three times: in 1702, 1716 and 1730. These calamities had a negative impact on his health, especially as he was getting old, but he nevertheless wrote his memoirs, which were filled with gratitude towards the Lord, to whom Swedberg attributed all good things in his life.

== Beliefs ==
Swedberg stood out because he criticized the Lutheran Church in Sweden. He had grown up in the countryside, unlike the many urban priests who had learnt Lutheranism from their fathers. Swedberg argued that modern Lutheranism in Sweden had become too doctrinal and had lost its way.

Throughout his life, Swedberg retained the Christian primitivism of his childhood. Spirits and angels were trusted: Swedberg claimed that God had saved his life more than once by warning Swedberg directly.
