= Archbishop of Uppsala =

Primate of the Church of Sweden

- Archbishopric

lutheran
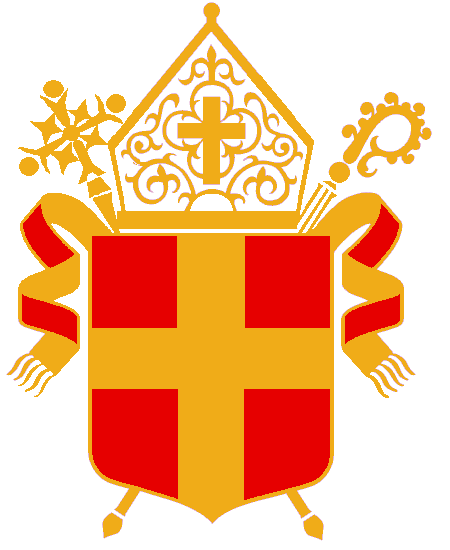
- Coat of arms
- Incumbent: Martin Modéus

Location
- Country: Sweden
- Residence: Archbishop's Palace, Uppsala

Information
- Established: 1164
- Archdiocese: Uppsala
- Cathedral: Uppsala Cathedral

Website
- svenskakyrkan.se/uppsalastift

The Archbishop of Uppsala (spelled Upsala until the early 20th century) has been the primate of Sweden in an unbroken succession since 1164, first during the Catholic era, and from the 1530s and onward under the Lutheran church.

== Historical overview ==
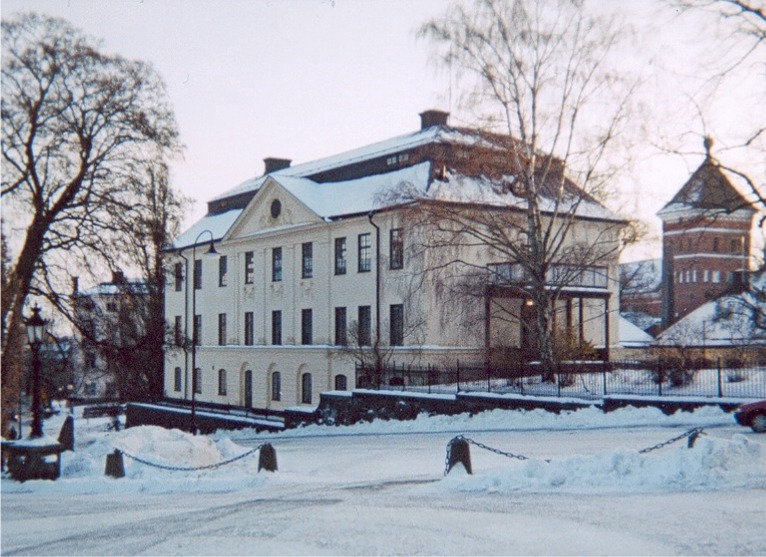
The Archbishop's Palace in Uppsala was designed in the 18th century by the architect Carl Hårleman, but built on older foundations.

There have been bishops in Uppsala from the time of Swedish King Ingold the Elder in the 11th century. They were governed by the archbishop of Hamburg-Bremen until Uppsala was made an archbishopric in 1164. Uppsala (then a village) was originally located a couple of miles to the north of the present city, in what is today known as Gamla Uppsala (Old Uppsala). In 1273, the archbishopric, together with the relics of King Eric the Saint, was moved to the market town of Östra Aros, which from then on is named Uppsala. The archbishop in Lund (which at that time belonged to Denmark) was declared primate of Sweden, meaning it was his right to select and ordain the Uppsala archbishop by handing him the pallium. To gain independence from Lund, Folke Johansson Ängel in 1274 went to Rome and was ordained directly by the pope. This practice was increasing, so that no Uppsala archbishop was in Lund after Olov Björnsson, in 1318. In 1457, the archbishop Jöns Bengtsson (Oxenstierna) was allowed by the pope to declare himself primate of Sweden.

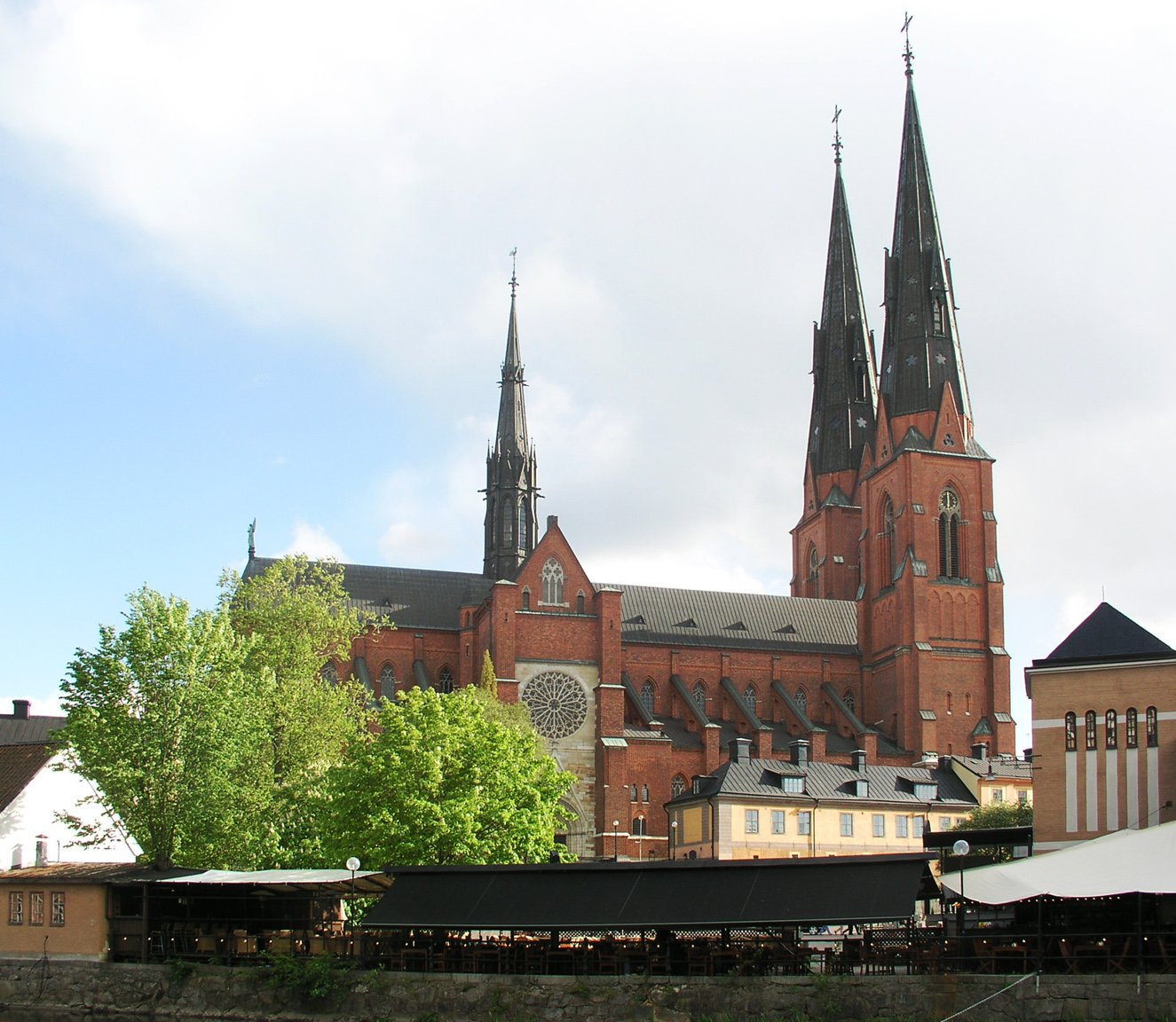
Uppsala Cathedral, seat of the Archbishop of Uppsala

In 1531, Laurentius Petri was chosen by King Gustav I of Sweden (Vasa) to be archbishop, taking that privilege from the pope and in effect making Sweden Protestant. The archbishop was then declared primus inter pares i.e. first among equals. The archbishop is both bishop of his diocese and Primate of Sweden; he has however no more authority than other bishops, although in effect his statements have a more widespread effect. In 1990, the Archbishop of Uppsala was aided in the diocese by a bishop of Uppsala. Karin Johannesson is the current (2022) Bishop of Uppsala.

== Notable archbishops ==
The labours of the archbishops extended in all directions. Some were zealous pastors of their flocks, such as Jarler and others; some were distinguished canonists, such as Birger Gregerson (1367–83) and Olof Larsson (1435-8); others were statesmen, such as Jöns Bengtsson Oxenstjerna (d. 1467), or capable administrators, such as Jacob Ulfsson Örnfot, who was distinguished as a prince of the Church, royal councillor, patron of art and learning, founder of the University of Upsala and an efficient helper in the introduction of printing into Sweden. There were also scholars, such as Johannes Magnus (died 1544), who wrote the "Historia de omnibus Gothorum sueonumque regibus" and the "Historia metropolitanæ ecclesiæ Upsaliensis", and his brother Olaus Magnus (d. 1588), who wrote the "Historia de gentibus septentrionalibus" and who was the last Catholic Archbishop of Upsala.

The archbishops and secular clergy found active co-workers among the regular clergy (i.e. religious orders). Among the orders represented in Sweden were the Benedictines, Cistercians, Dominicans, Franciscans, Brigittines (with the mother-house at Wadstena) and Carthusians. A Swedish Protestant investigator, Carl Silfverstolpe, wrote: "The monks were almost the sole bond of union in the Middle Ages between the civilization of the north and that of southern Europe, and it can be claimed that the active relations between our monasteries and those in southern lands were the arteries through which the higher civilization reached our country."

See Birger Gregersson (1366–83; hymnist and author), Nils Ragvaldsson (1438–48; early adherent of Old Norse mythology), Jöns Bengtsson (Oxenstierna) (1448–67; Regent of Sweden), Jakob Ulfsson (1470–1514; founder of Uppsala University), Gustav Trolle (1515–21; supporter of the Danish King), Johannes Magnus (1523–26: wrote an imaginative Scandianian Chronicle), Laurentius Petri (1531–73; main character behind the Swedish Lutheran reformation), Abraham Angermannus (1593–99; controversial critic of the King), Olaus Martini (1601–09), Petrus Kenicius (1609–36), Laurentius Paulinus Gothus (1637–46; astronomer and philosopher of Ramus school), Johannes Canuti Lenaeus (1647–69; Aristotelian and logician), Erik Benzelius the Elder (1700–09; highly knowledgeable), Haquin Spegel (1711–14; public educator), Mattias Steuchius (1714–30), Uno von Troil (1786–1803; politician), Jakob Axelsson Lindblom (1805–19), Johan Olof Wallin (1837–39; beloved poet and hymnist), Karl Fredrik af Wingård (1839–51; politician), Henrik Reuterdahl (1856–70) Anton Niklas Sundberg (1870–1900; outspoken and controversial) and Nathan Söderblom (1914–1931; Nobel Prize winner).

== Earliest bishops ==
The first written mention of a bishop at Uppsala is from Adam of Bremen's Gesta Hammaburgensis ecclesiae pontificum that records in passing Adalvard the Younger appointed as the bishop for Sictunam et Ubsalam in the 1060s. Swedish sources never mention him either in Sigtuna or Uppsala.

The medieval Annales Suecici Medii Aevi and the 13th century legend of Saint Botvid mention some Henry as the Bishop of Uppsala (Henricus scilicet Upsalensis) in 1129, participating in the consecration of the saint's newly built church. He is apparently the same Bishop Henry who died at the Battle of Fotevik in 1134, fighting along with the Danes after being banished from Sweden. Known from the Chronicon Roskildense written soon after his death and from Saxo Grammaticus' Gesta Danorum from the early 13th century, he had fled to Denmark from Sigtuna. Also he is omitted from, or at least redated in, the first list of bishops made in the 15th century. In this list, the first bishop at Uppsala was Sverinius (Siwardus?), succeeded by Nicolaus, Sveno, Henricus and Kopmannus. With the exception of Henricus, the list only mentions their names.
