= Magnus Beronius =

Swedish archbishop

The Most Reverend Magnus Beronius
- Archbishop of Uppsala; Primate of Sweden
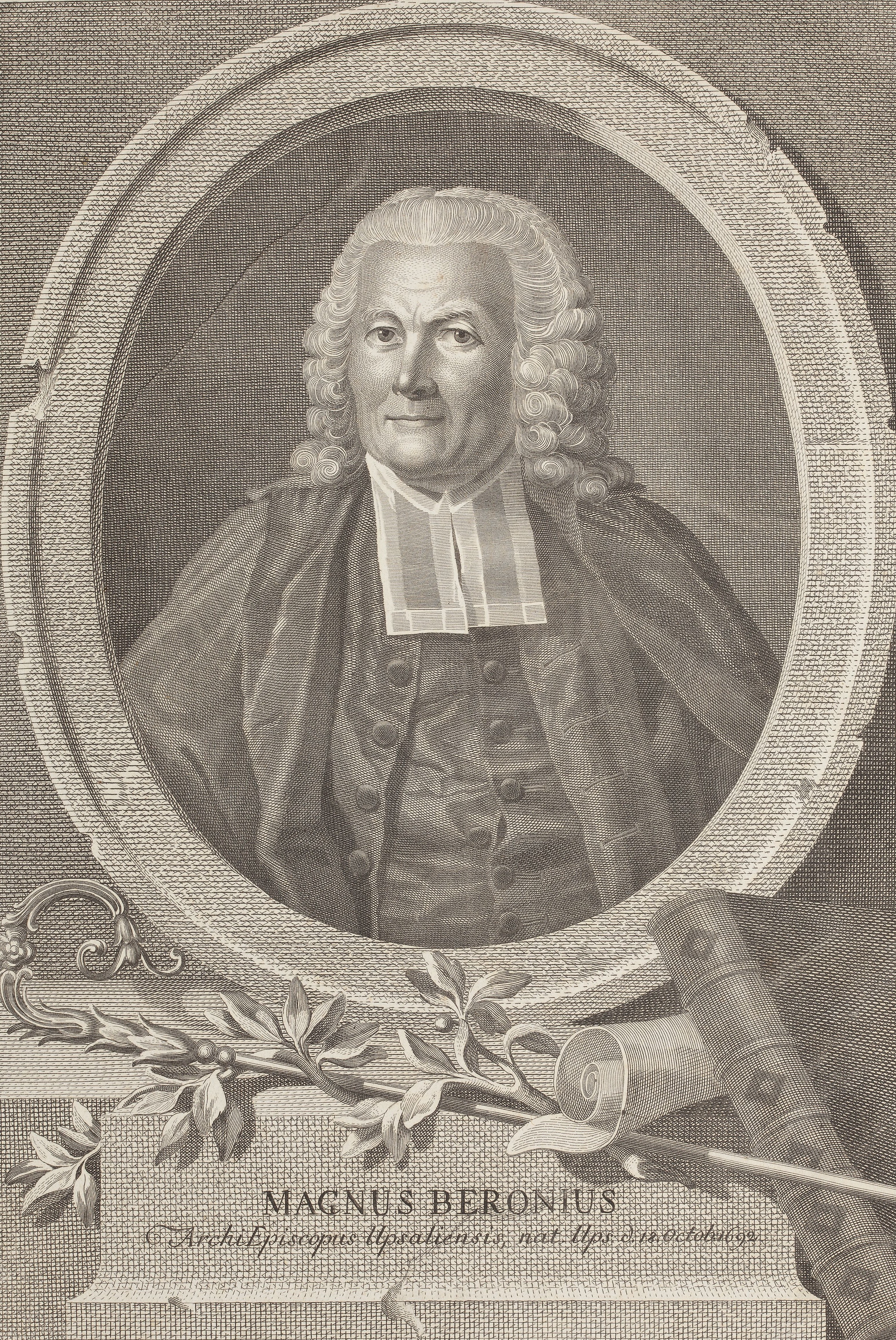
- Church: Church of Sweden
- Archdiocese: Uppsala
- Appointed: 1764
- In office: 1764–1775
- Predecessor: Samuel Troilius
- Successor: Carl Fredrik Mennander
- Previous post: Bishop of Kalmar (1745–1764)

Orders
- Consecration: 1745
- Rank: Metropolitan Archbishop

Personal details
- Born: 18 October 1692 Uppsala, Sweden
- Died: 18 May 1775 (aged 82)
- Buried: Uppsala Cathedral
- Parents: Olaus Magni Beronis; Catharina Celsia
- Spouse: Catharina Elisabeth Valleria 1st marriage Johanna Catharina Burman 2nd marriage

Magnus Olai Beronius (18 October 1692 – 18 May 1775) was Archbishop of Uppsala in the Church of Sweden from 1764 to his death.

== Biography ==
Magnus Beronius was the son of Olaus Magni Beronis and Catharina Celsia and was born in Uppsala, Sweden. His father was the vicar of Uppsala. He studied at Uppsala University receiving his master's degree in 1716. In 1723 he became associate professor and was appointed lecturer at Gävle in 1724. After he undertook a trip through Europe, he was appointed a theology lecturer at Uppsala University in 1727. He was appointed professor first in poetry, and then he changed to theology.

In 1745, Beronius became bishop of the Diocese of Kalmar. He was elected Archbishop of Uppsala after the death of Samuel Troilius in 1764. He was also a representative in the Swedish parliament Riksdag of the Estates assemblies in 1765–1766. He and his five children were ennobled under the surname Björnstjerna in 1760. Beronius died in 1775 in Uppsala.

== See also ==
- List of Archbishops of Uppsala

== Other sources ==
- Svenskt biografiskt handlexikon (1906), article Beronius In Swedish

Preceded by Samuel Troilius	Archbishop of Uppsala; 1764–1775	Succeeded by Carl Fredrik Mennander
