= Troilius =

Troilius may refer to:

- Samuel Troilius, Archbishop of Uppsala in the Church of Sweden from 1758 to 1764

It may also mean:

- Troilus, a young Trojan prince in classical mythology
- Troilus family, Swedish family
