= Stortorget, Kalmar =

Coordinates: 56°39′51″N 16°21′57″E

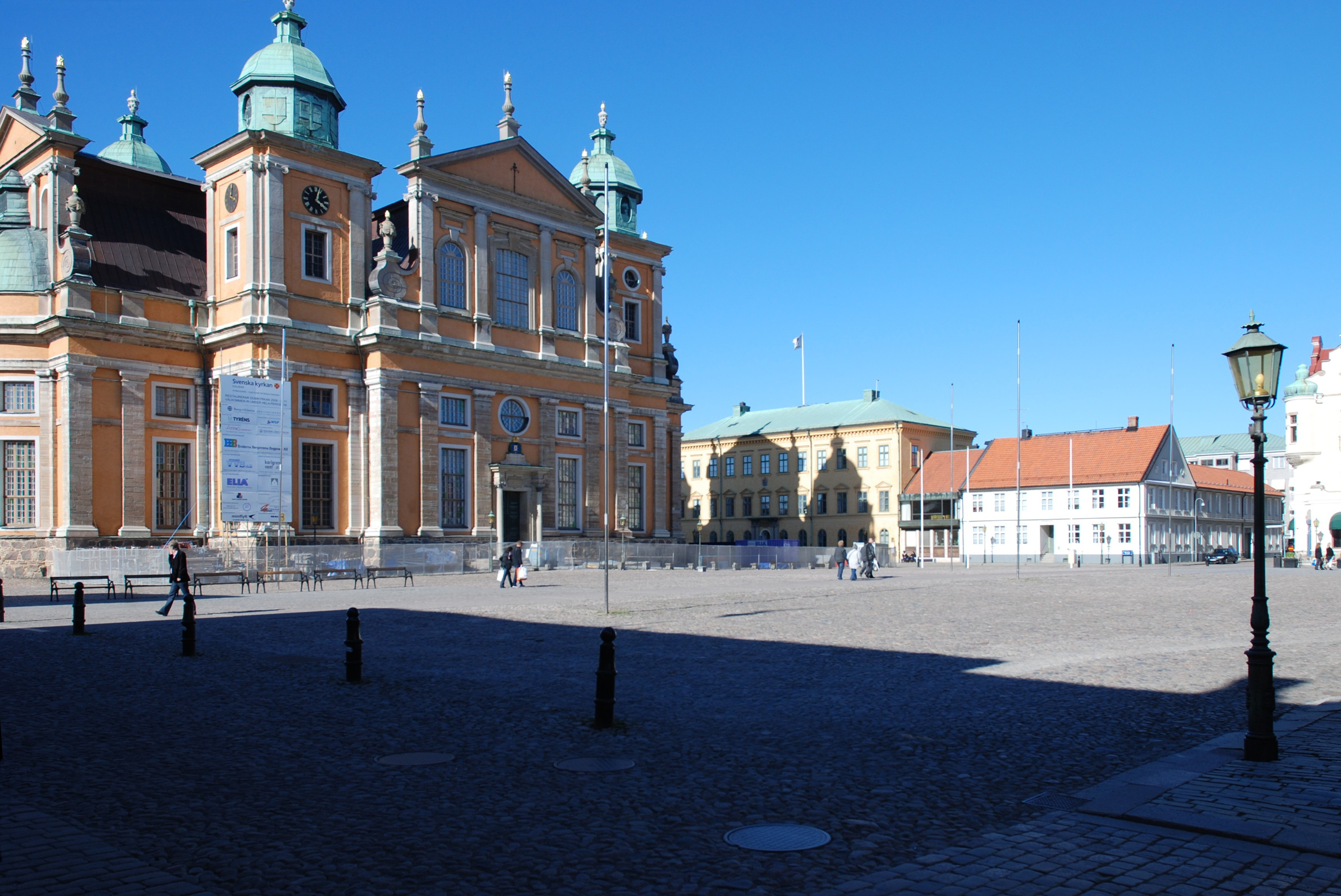
Stortorget in Kalmar

Stortorget (Grand Square) is the main square in the historic centre of the Swedish city of Kalmar.

== History ==
Situated on the island Kvarnholmen, it was built during the mid 17th century around Kalmar Cathedral and became the centre of religious life, justice, education, commerce and municipal management. It also contained a municipal well until the redevelopment in the early 21st century.

== Redesign ==
In 1999, an extensive regeneration program for Kvarnholmen was launched, including Larmtorget and Västerport Bridge and North and South streets. The resulting architectural competition was won by British architects Caruso St John in a joint proposal with Eva Löfdahl called Field of stones/Ett stengolv.

The Grand Square was redefined as an open space within the dense urban core, providing respite from the busy shopping streets. As a gathering space, it is now used for various activities and events.

Stortorget was declared a historic monument in 2002. Following its completion in 2003, the project received several awards in 2004 and 2005, including the 2004 Siena Prize of the Association of Swedish architects (Sveriges Arkitekter).

== Design ==
In the square a number of water chambers have been constructed in which water is pumped around. From the five wells, fitted with barred concrete lid, you hear water gurgle and splash of an association with the former city well.

The Square, dominated by former and freshly laid cobblestones and paving stones in walkways, has been designed to provide a large uniform surface to form a cohesive impression without sticking events.

Above the square surface is mounted a few narrow master with little red lights on top. Also on some of the surrounding buildings roof is such lanterns.

== Literature ==
- Helena Mattsson (redaktör): Kalmar stortorg - konst/arkitektur i stadsrummet, Statens konstråd, Stockholm 2005,ISBN 91-974868-2-5

== Sources ==
- Om förnyelsen av Stortorget i Kalmar av "Hjalmar", på Kalmar kommuns webbplats, läst 2011-02-04
