= Kalmar =

City in Småland, Sweden

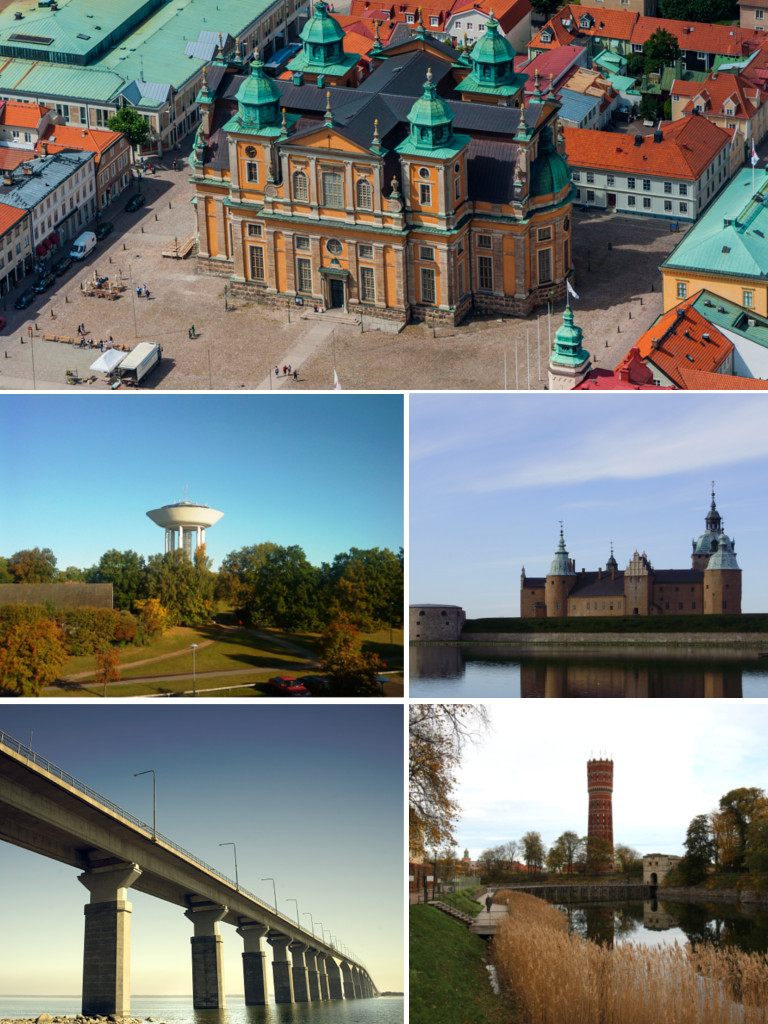
- Clockwise from top: aerial view of the Kalmar Cathedral, Kalmar Castle, the old water tower in central Kalmar, Öland Bridge and the water tower in Berga.

- Coat of arms

- Location within Kalmar Location within Sweden
- Coordinates: 56°39′41″N 16°21′46″E
- Country: Sweden
- Province: Småland
- County: Kalmar County
- Municipality: Kalmar Municipality
- Charter: 1100

Area
  - City: 19.50 km^{2} (7.53 sq mi)
- Elevation: 8 m (26 ft)

Population (2020)
  - City: 41,852
  - Density: 1,866/km^{2} (4,830/sq mi)
  - Metro: 72,098
- Time zone: UTC+1 (CET)
  - Summer (DST): UTC+2 (CEST)
- Postal code: 39x xx
- Area code: (+46) 480
- Website: kalmar.se

Kalmar (/ˈkælmɑːr/, US also /ˈkɑːlmɑːr/, Swedish: [ˈkǎlmar]) is a city in the southeast of Sweden, situated by the Baltic Sea. It had 41,388 inhabitants in 2020 and is the seat of Kalmar Municipality. It is also the capital of Kalmar County, which comprises 12 municipalities with a total of 236,399 inhabitants (2015). Kalmar is the third largest urban area in the province and cultural region of Småland.

From the thirteenth to the seventeenth centuries, Kalmar was one of Sweden's most important cities. Its name was until the second half of the nineteenth century spelled Calmar. Between 1602 and 1913 it was the episcopal see of Kalmar Diocese, with a bishop, and the Kalmar Cathedral from 1702 is an example of classicist architecture. It became a fortified city, with the Kalmar Castle as the center. After the Treaty of Roskilde in 1658, Kalmar's importance diminished, until the industry sector was initiated in the 19th century. The city is home to parts of Linnaeus University.

Kalmar is adjacent to the main route to the island of Öland over the Öland Bridge.

== History ==
The area around Kalmar has been inhabited since ancient times. Excavations have found traces of Stone Age gravefields. However, the oldest evidence for there being a town is from the 11th century. The oldest city seal of Kalmar is from somewhere between 1255 and 1267, making it the oldest known city seal in Scandinavia.

In the 12th century the first foundations of a castle were established, with the construction of a round tower for guard and lookout. The tower was continuously expanded in the 13th century, and as such, Queen Margaret called an assembly there between the heads of state of Sweden and Norway, and on 13 July 1397, the Kalmar Union treaty was signed, creating a union which would last until 1523. Kalmar's strategic location, near the Danish border (at the time the Scanian lands, i.e. the provinces of Blekinge, Halland and Scania, were part of Denmark), and its harbour and trade, also involved it in several feuds. There are two events independently labelled the Kalmar Bloodbath: the first in 1505, when King John of Denmark, Norway, and Sweden had the mayor and city council of Kalmar executed; the second in 1599 by command of Duke Charles, later to become King Charles IX of Sweden.

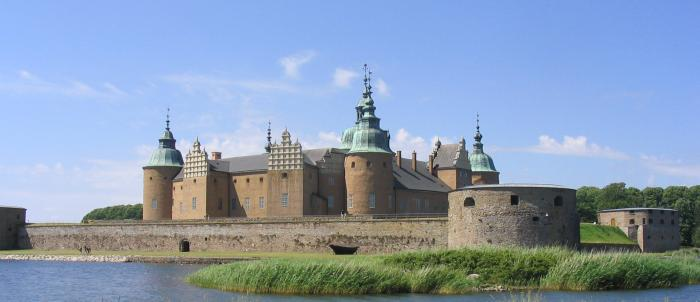
Kalmar Castle today

In the 1540s, first King Gustav Vasa, and later his sons Erik XIV of Sweden and John III of Sweden would organize a rebuilding of the castle into the magnificent Renaissance castle it is today.

Kalmar became a diocese of the Church of Sweden in 1603, a position it held until 1915. In 1634, Kalmar County was founded, with Kalmar as the natural capital. In 1660, the Kalmar Cathedral was begun by drawings of Nicodemus Tessin the Elder. It would be inaugurated in 1703.

In 1611–1613, it suffered in the Kalmar War, which began with a Danish siege of Kalmar Castle. 1611 is mentioned as the darkest year of Kalmar's history, but by no means the only dark year; much blood has been shed in the vicinity of the castle. The last was during the Scanian War in the 1670s, so there have been 22 sieges altogether; however the castle was never taken.

After the Treaty of Roskilde in 1658, the strategic importance of Kalmar gradually diminished as the borders of Sweden were redrawn further south. In 1689, the King established his main naval base further south in Karlskrona and Kalmar lost its status as one of Sweden's main military outposts.

=== Kalmar Cathedral ===
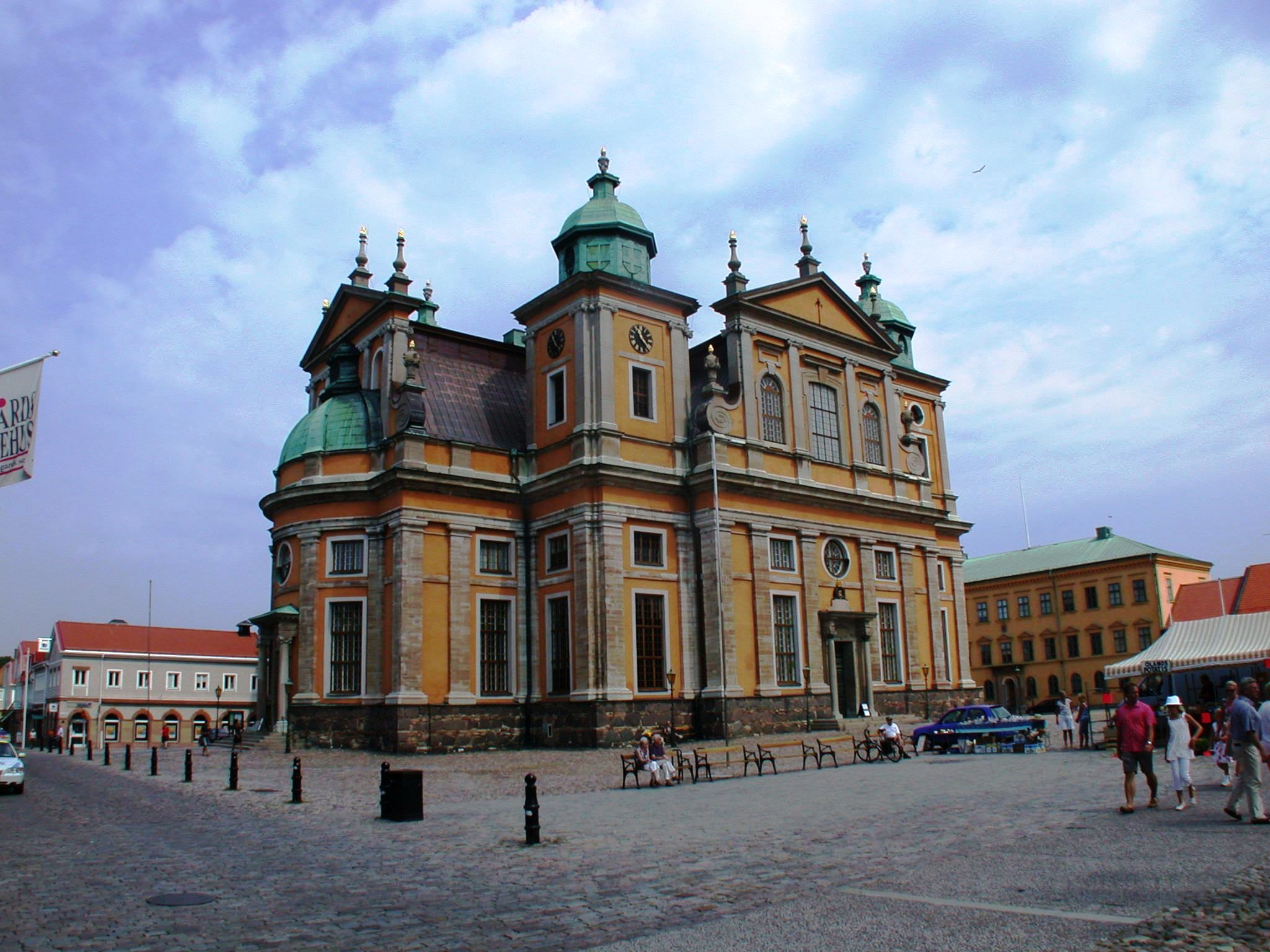
Kalmar Cathedral today

The new city of Kalmar was built on Kvarnholmen around the mid-1600s. The transfer from the old town was largely completed by 1658. The new, fortified town was planned following current baroque patterns. Cathedral and town hall face each other across the new main square, Stortorget.

The cathedral was designed by Nicodemus Tessin the Elder and is one of the foremost examples of baroque classicism in Sweden. Its design reflects the complex interaction between the new style, liturgical considerations, tradition and the fortress-city requirements. The work began in 1660, but it was interrupted on several occasions, including when the Scanian War (1675–1679) raged. Construction resumed, and Kalmar Cathedral stood finished in 1703.

=== Today ===
In more recent times, Kalmar has been an industrial city with Kalmar Verkstad making steam engines, trains and large machinery, later bought by Bombardier who closed the factory in 2005. A shipyard, Kalmar Shipyard, was founded in 1679 and closed 1981. Volvo opened their Kalmar factory for building cars i.e. 264, 740, 760, 960 in 1974, but closed it 1994 and due to further relocation of industry jobs in the 1990s and 2000s around 2000 industrial jobs were lost. Kalmar has a university with over 9,000 students and a research facility for Telia Sonera.

Kalmar has embarked on a comprehensive program to reduce fossil fuel use. A local trucking firm, which employs nearly 450 people, has installed computers that track fuel efficiency and have cut diesel use by 10 percent, paying off the cost of the devices in just a year. The company is now looking to fuel its future fleet with biodiesel.

A large wood pulp plant harnesses the steam and hot water it once released as waste to provide heating, through below-ground pipes, and generates enough electricity to power its own operations and 20,000 homes.

Bicycle lanes are common; for example, the Kalmarsundsleden, and cars line up at Kalmar city's public biogas pump. Building codes now require thermal insulation and efficient windows for new construction or retrofits. Street lights use low-energy sodium bulbs, and car dealers promote fuel-efficient and hybrid vehicles.

In 2011 Guldfågeln Arena was initiated. It is the new stadium of the football team of the city, Kalmar FF. The capacity of the stadium is 12,000 people and it is currently one of the newest stadiums in Sweden. The stadium was also built to host concerts and did so in the summer of 2011 when Swedish artists Håkan Hellström and The Ark performed.

== Climate ==
Kalmar has an oceanic climate using the -3°C isotherm or a warm-summer humid continental climate using the 0°C isotherm. Summers are warm and winters are fairly cold with temperatures normally hovering around zero. Kalmar is among the hottest Swedish cities, with an all-time record set at 35.2 °C (95.4 °F). The average summer temperatures however are typical for southern Sweden.

Climate data for Kalmar (2002–2020); extremes since 1901
Month	Jan	Feb	Mar	Apr	May	Jun	Jul	Aug	Sep	Oct	Nov	Dec	Year
Record high °C (°F)	11.6 (52.9)	17.0 (62.6)	20.6 (69.1)	25.7 (78.3)	32.5 (90.5)	33.0 (91.4)	35.2 (95.4)	33.1 (91.6)	28.5 (83.3)	23.5 (74.3)	17.4 (63.3)	13.2 (55.8)	35.2 (95.4)
Mean maximum °C (°F)	8.5 (47.3)	8.7 (47.7)	14.9 (58.8)	18.9 (66.0)	23.5 (74.3)	27.2 (81.0)	28.1 (82.6)	27.2 (81.0)	22.7 (72.9)	17.6 (63.7)	12.5 (54.5)	9.2 (48.6)	29.4 (84.9)
Mean daily maximum °C (°F)	2.3 (36.1)	2.8 (37.0)	6.4 (43.5)	11.4 (52.5)	16.3 (61.3)	20.6 (69.1)	22.6 (72.7)	22.1 (71.8)	18.0 (64.4)	11.9 (53.4)	7.2 (45.0)	3.9 (39.0)	12.1 (53.8)
Daily mean °C (°F)	−0.5 (31.1)	−0.2 (31.6)	2.3 (36.1)	6.2 (43.2)	10.8 (51.4)	15.1 (59.2)	17.5 (63.5)	16.9 (62.4)	13.3 (55.9)	8.3 (46.9)	4.6 (40.3)	1.3 (34.3)	8.0 (46.3)
Mean daily minimum °C (°F)	−3.2 (26.2)	−3.1 (26.4)	−1.8 (28.8)	1.0 (33.8)	5.3 (41.5)	9.6 (49.3)	12.3 (54.1)	11.7 (53.1)	8.6 (47.5)	4.6 (40.3)	2.0 (35.6)	−1.3 (29.7)	3.8 (38.9)
Mean minimum °C (°F)	−14.9 (5.2)	−13.8 (7.2)	−10.0 (14.0)	−5.2 (22.6)	−1.7 (28.9)	3.0 (37.4)	6.6 (43.9)	4.9 (40.8)	1.2 (34.2)	−3.8 (25.2)	−6.7 (19.9)	−11.4 (11.5)	−17.7 (0.1)
Record low °C (°F)	−31.0 (−23.8)	−26.5 (−15.7)	−27.6 (−17.7)	−12.7 (9.1)	−5.8 (21.6)	−1.2 (29.8)	2.6 (36.7)	0.4 (32.7)	−5.7 (21.7)	−8.8 (16.2)	−17.3 (0.9)	−25.3 (−13.5)	−31.0 (−23.8)
Average precipitation mm (inches)	36.3 (1.43)	33.9 (1.33)	27.1 (1.07)	24.8 (0.98)	37.8 (1.49)	42.1 (1.66)	75.3 (2.96)	60.2 (2.37)	32.9 (1.30)	53.4 (2.10)	57.1 (2.25)	42.3 (1.67)	523.2 (20.61)
Source 1: SMHI
Source 2: SMHI Monthly Data 2002–2020 OGIMET

== Gallery ==
=== History ===
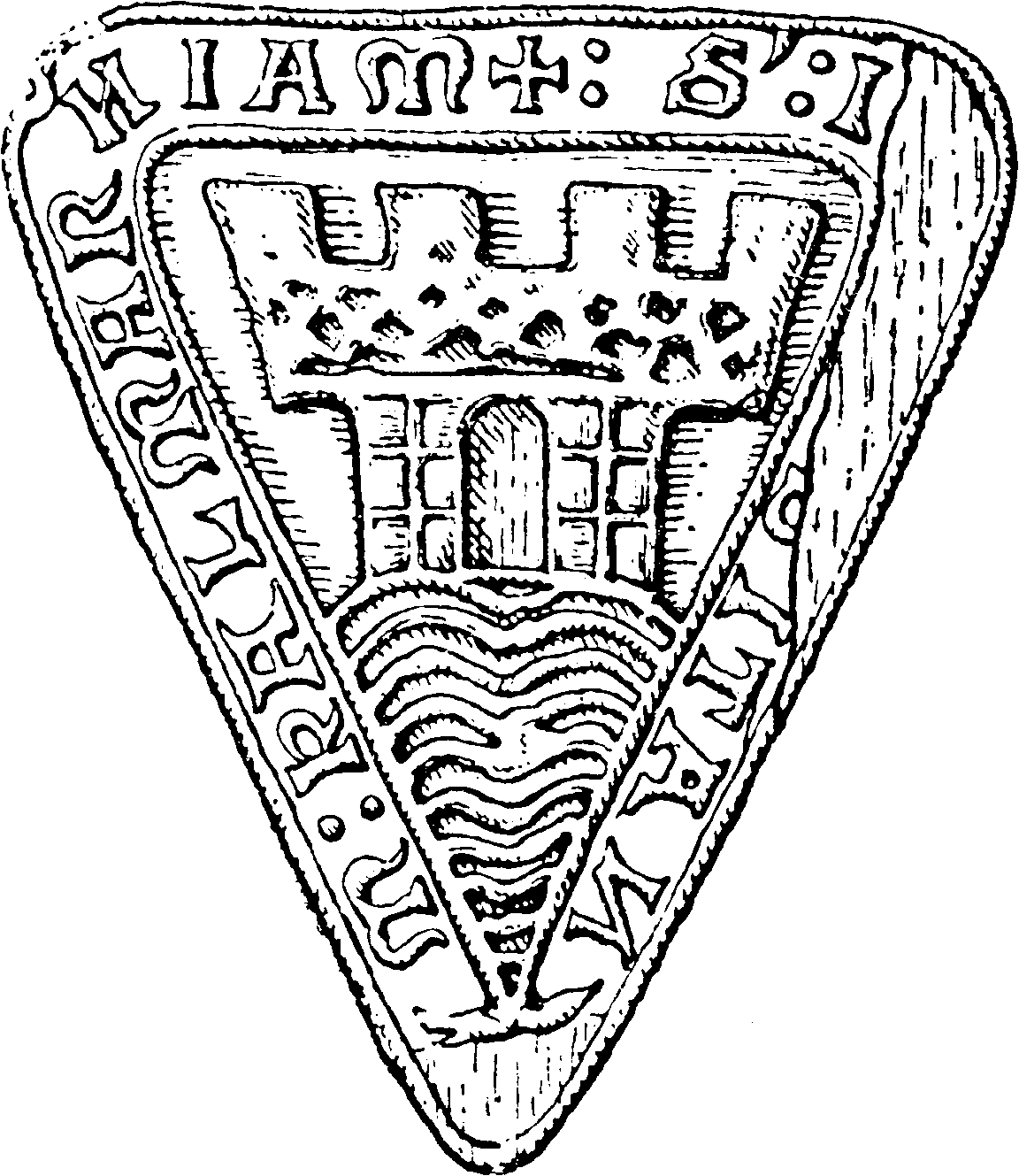
The seal of Kalmar, 13th century

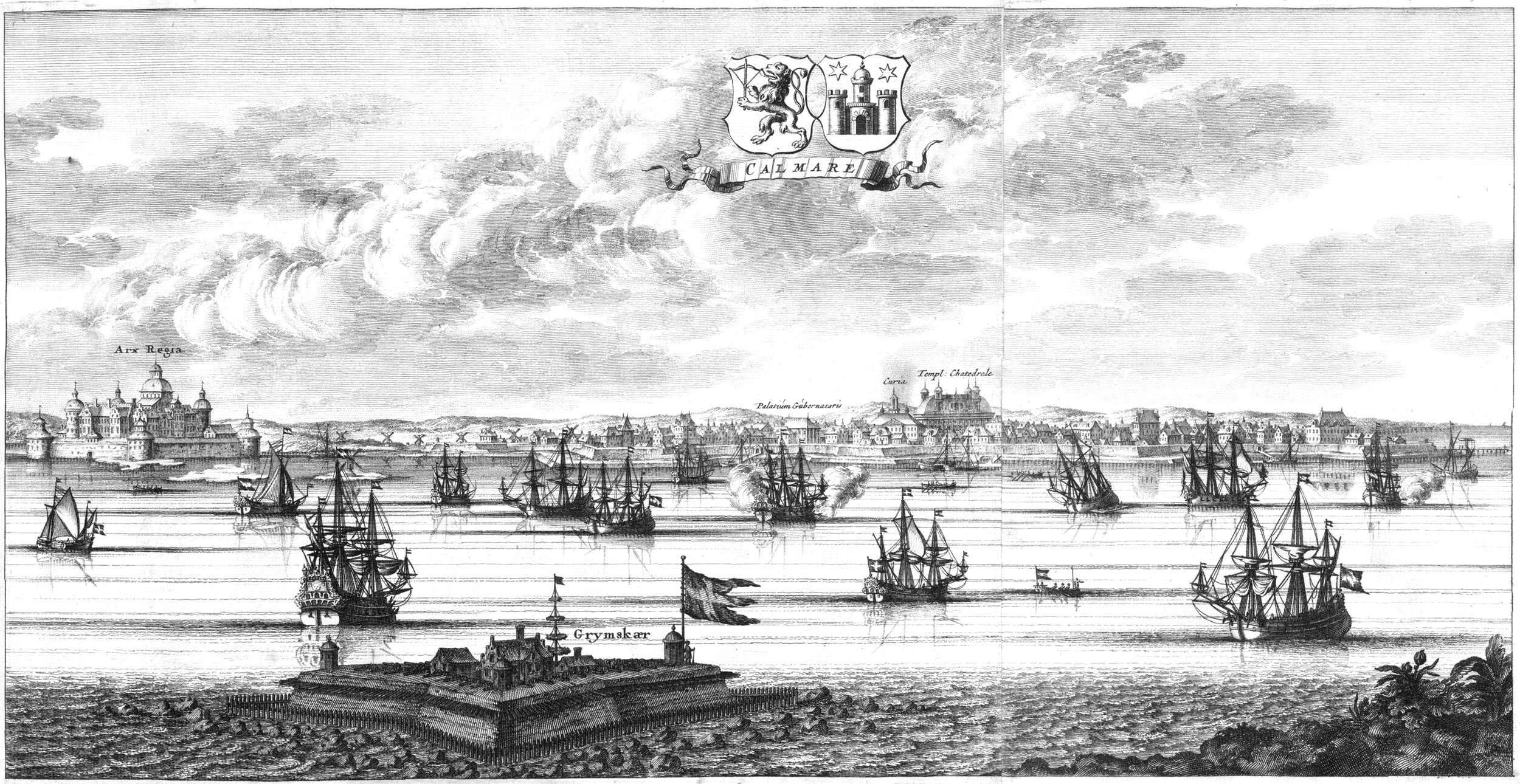
Engraving from Suecia antiqua et hodierna, circa 1700

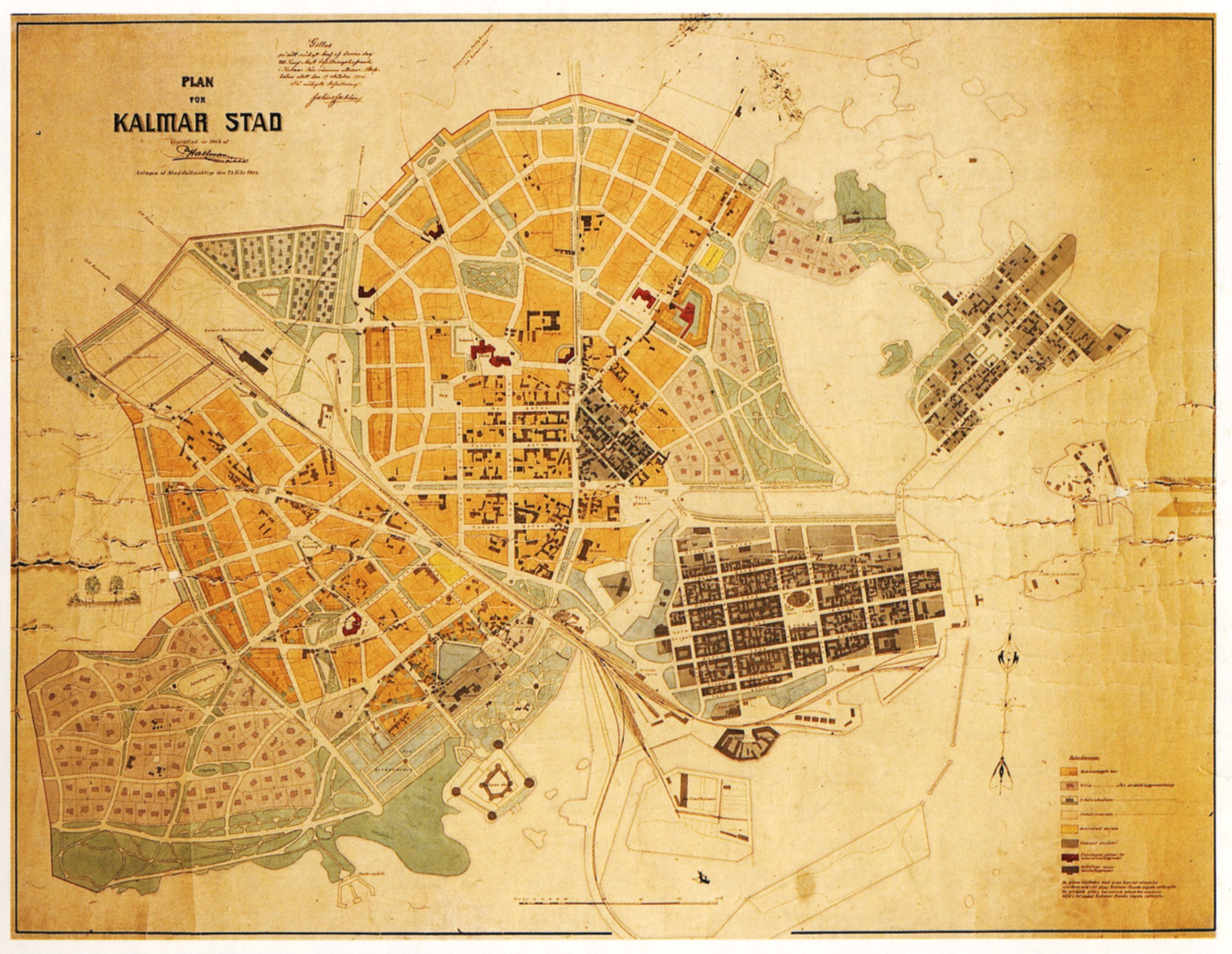
Town plan, 1906

=== Main sights ===
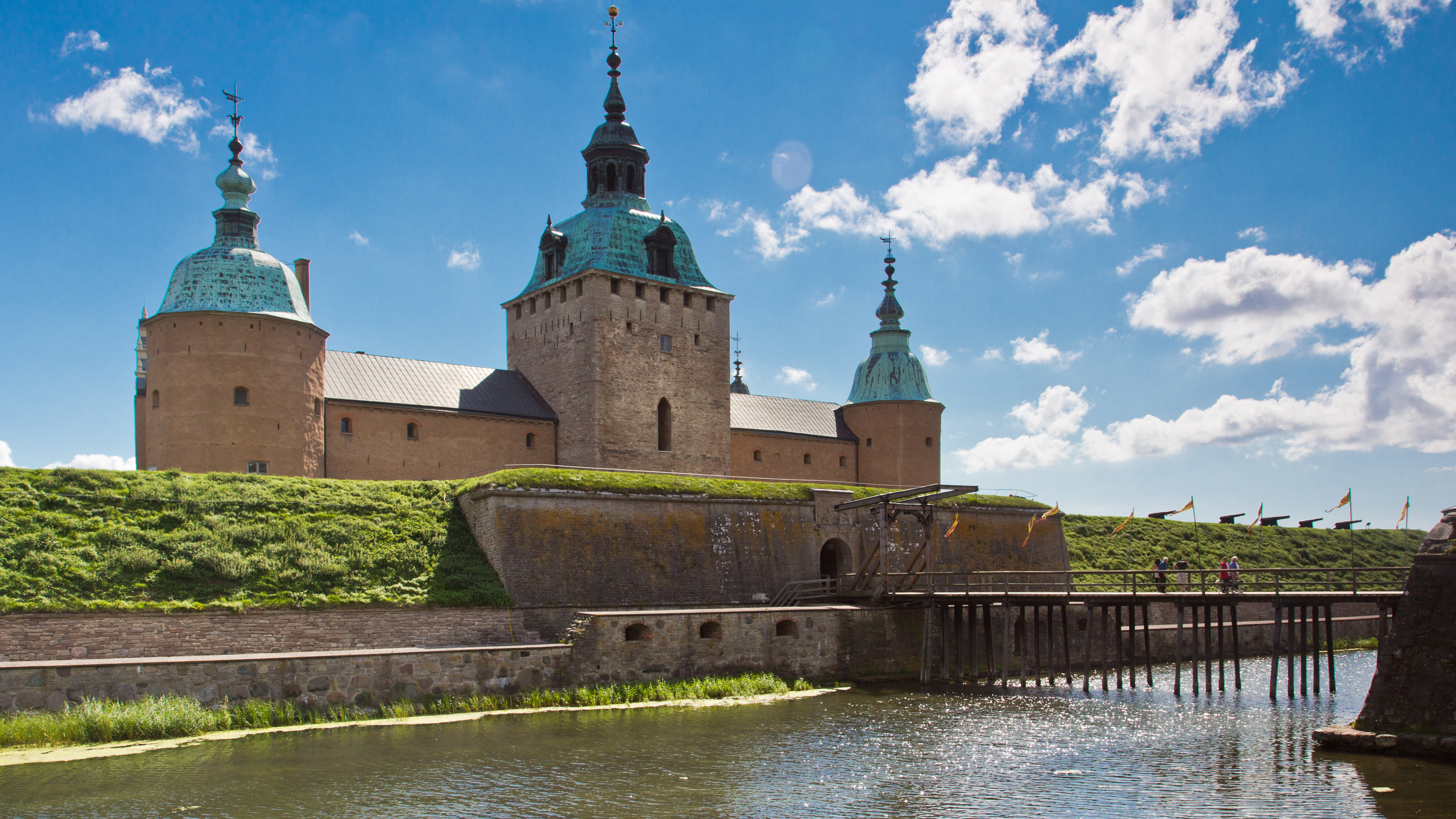
Kalmar Castle

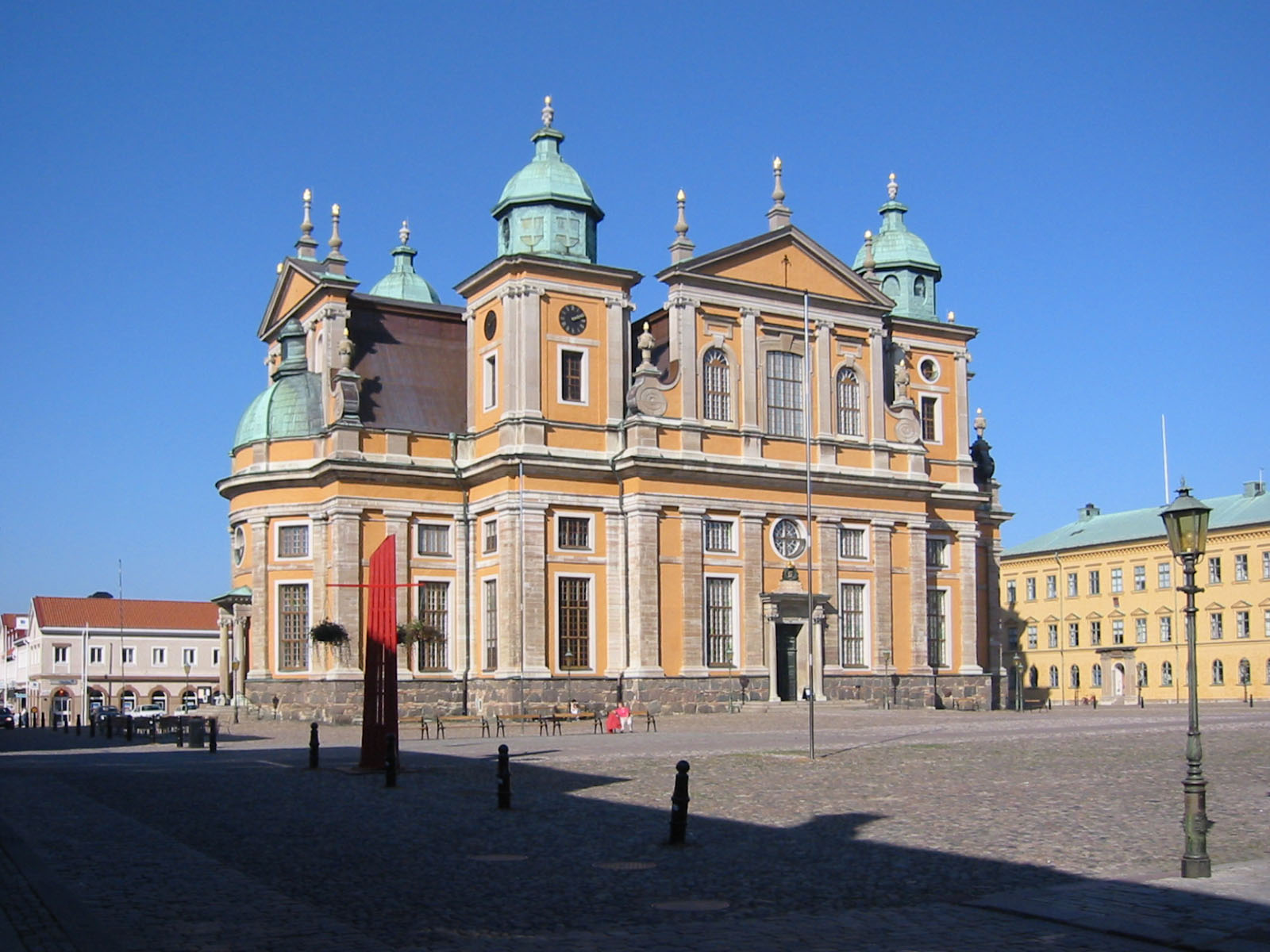
Kalmar Cathedral

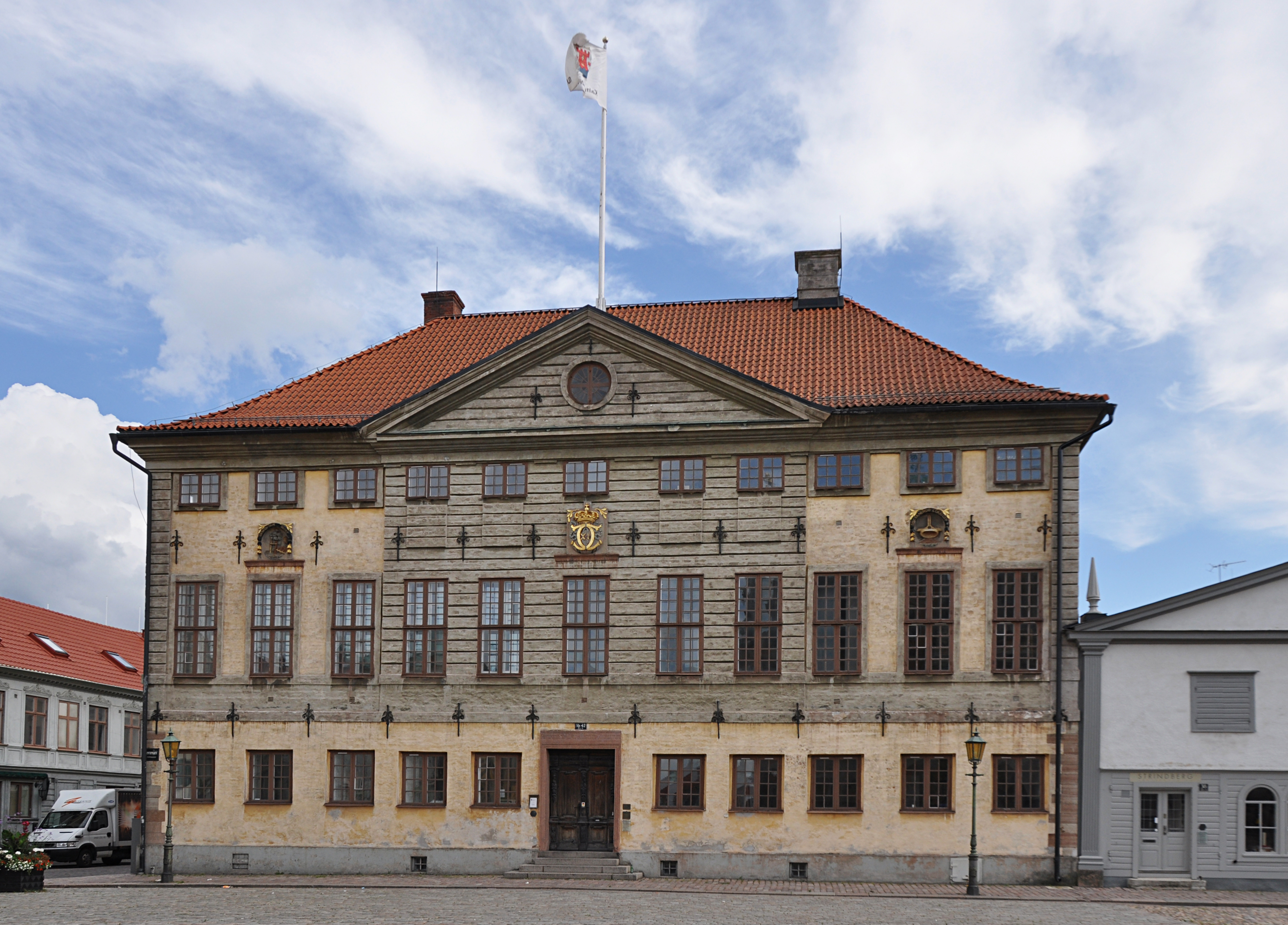
Town hall

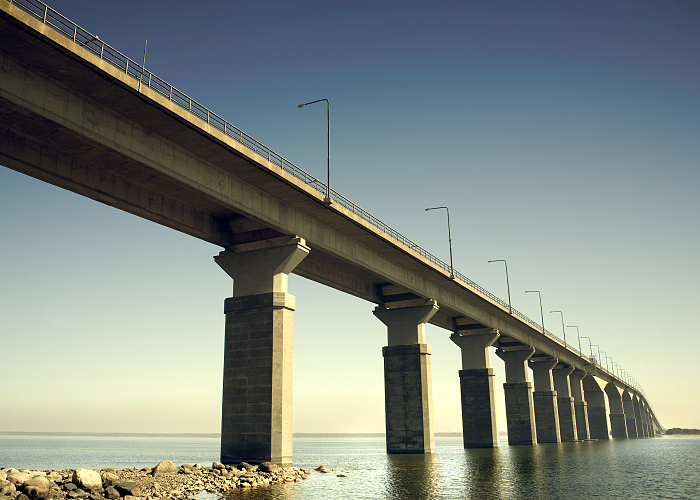
In 1972, the 6 km (4 mi) long Öland bridge was built from Kalmar to the town of Färjestaden on Öland

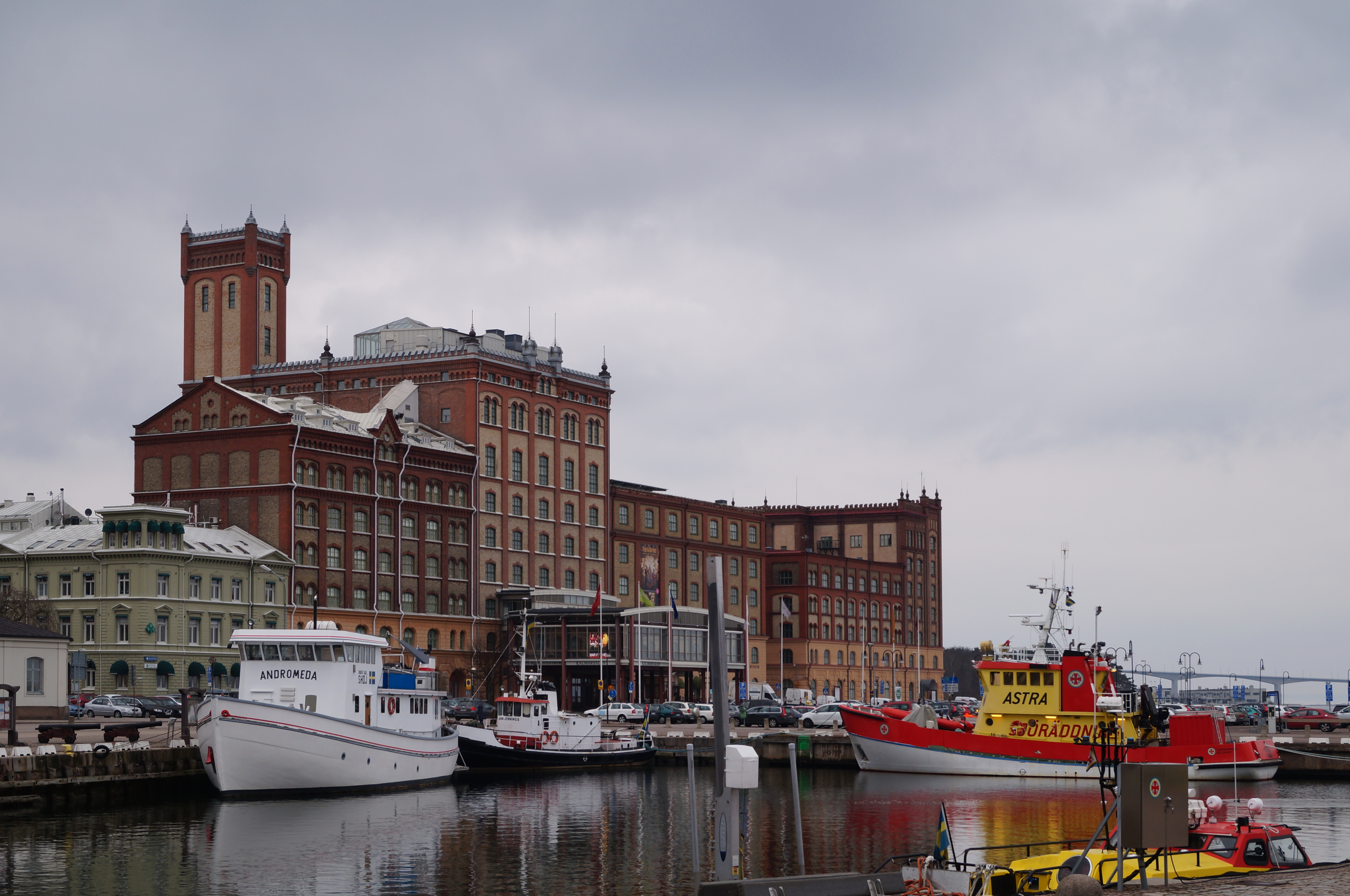
Kalmar County Museum

=== General views ===
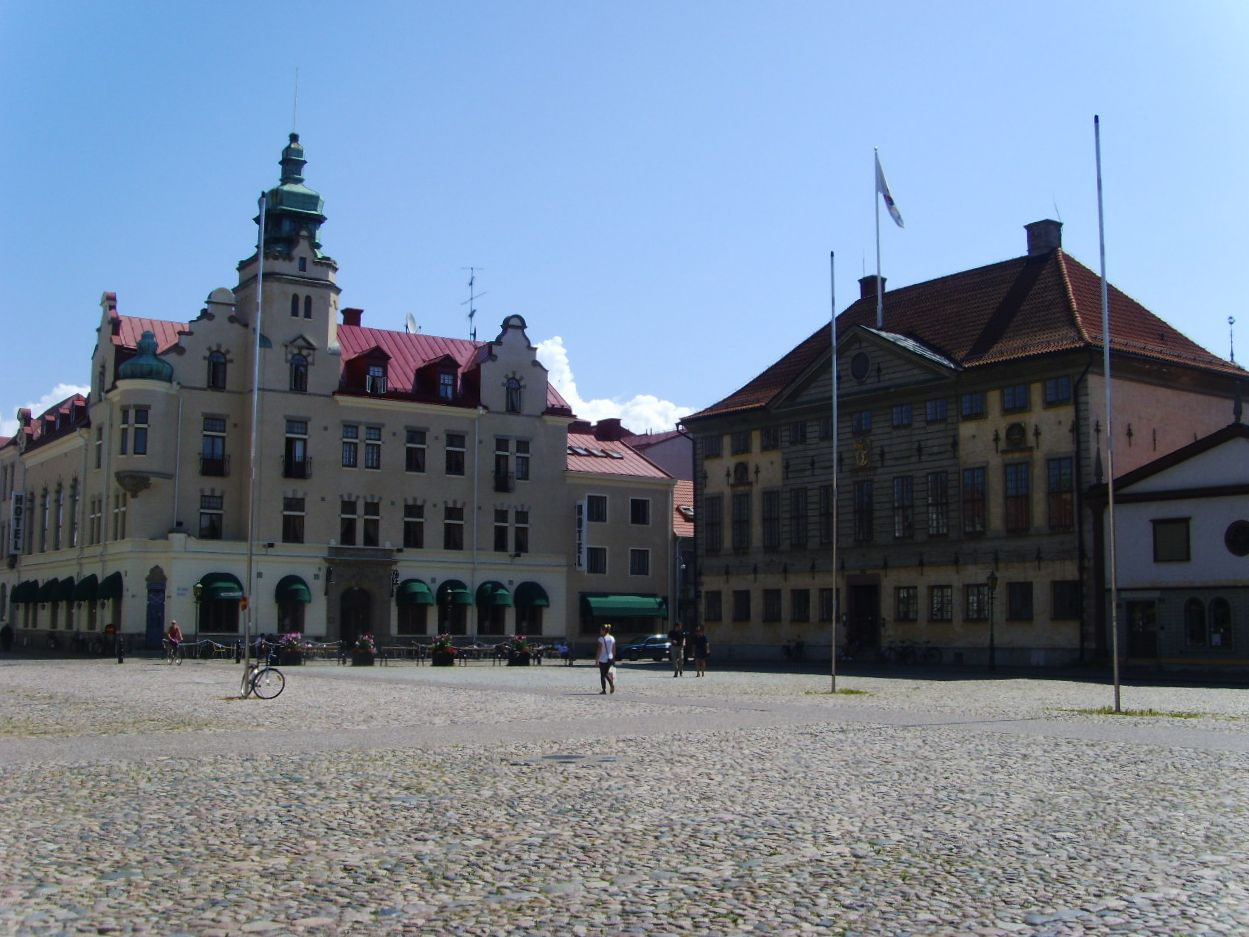
Main square

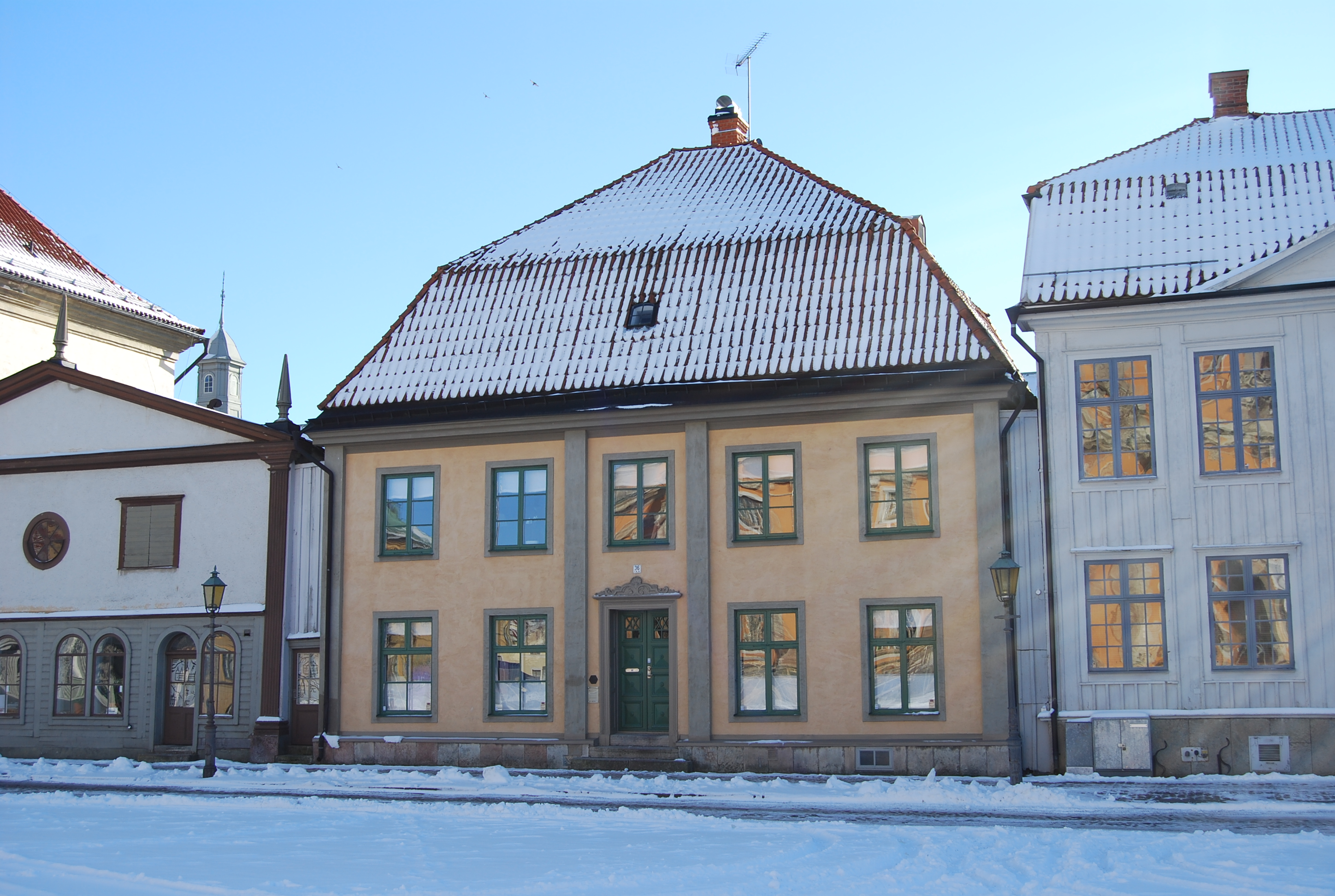
Houses on the main square

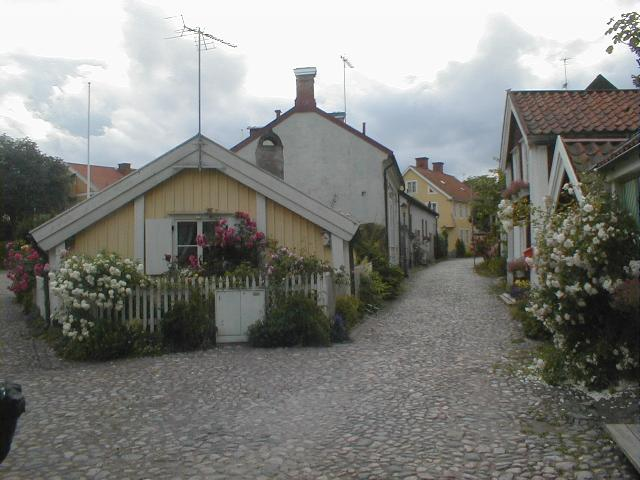
Street in Kalmar

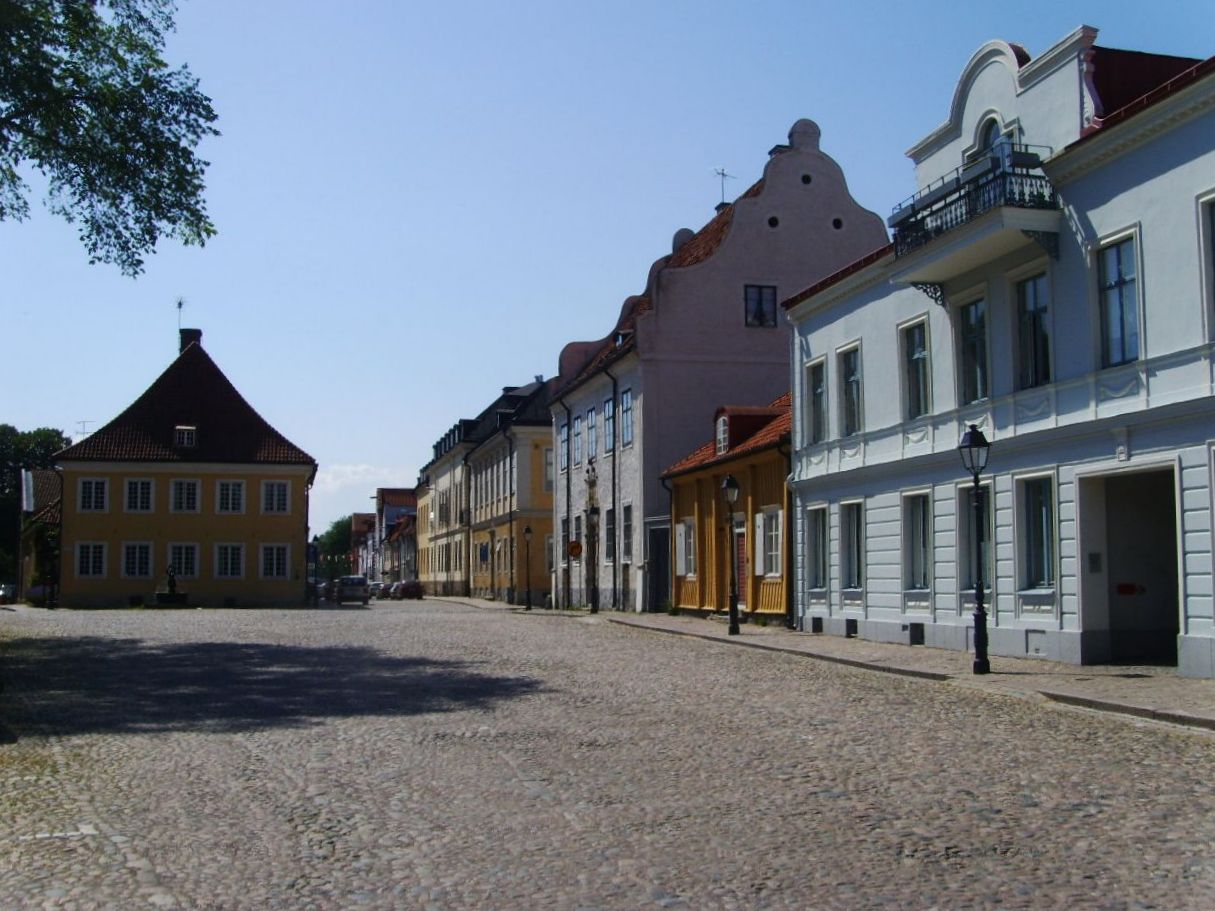
Square in Kalmar

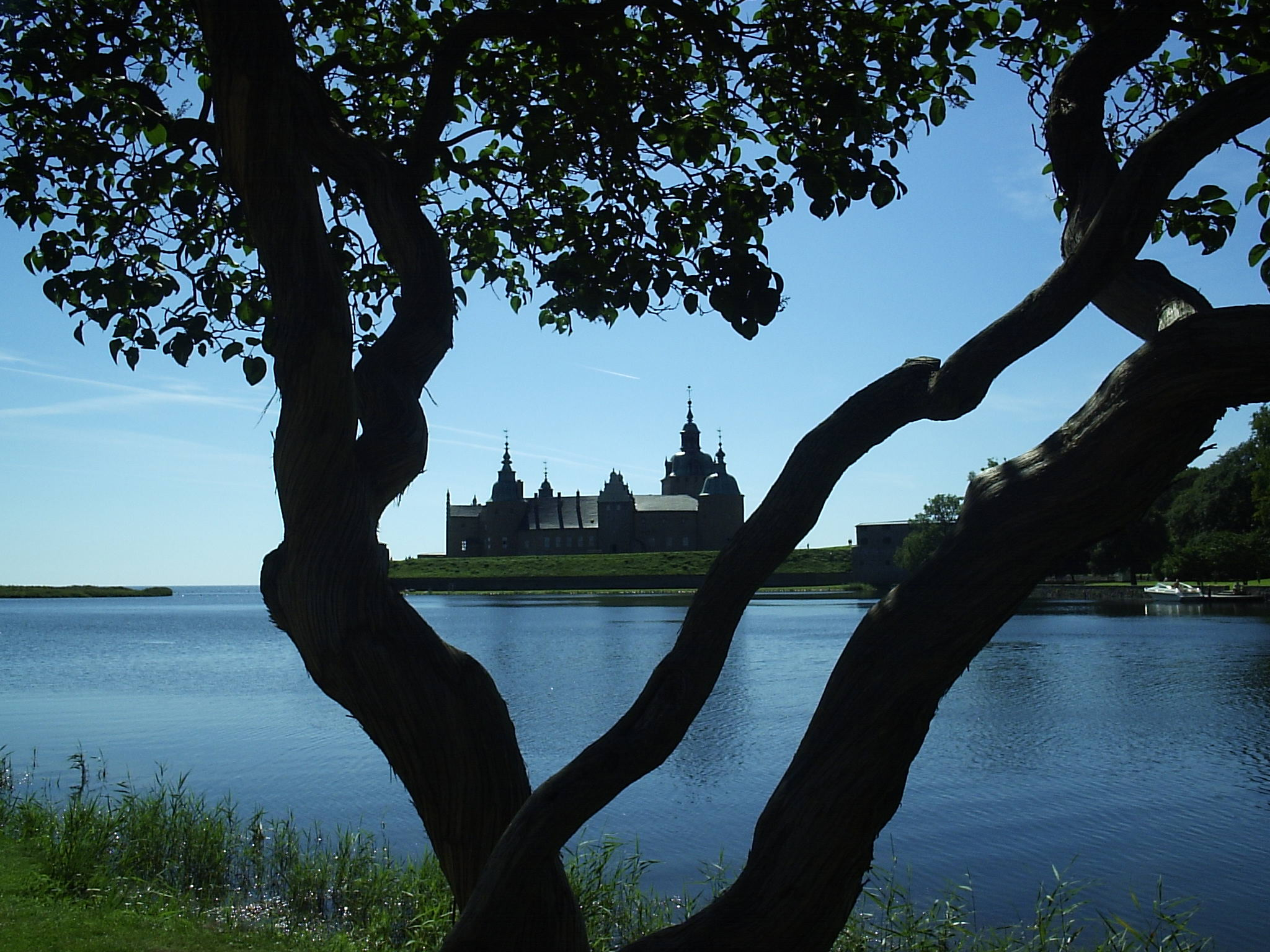
Scenic photograph of Kalmar Castle in the summer sun

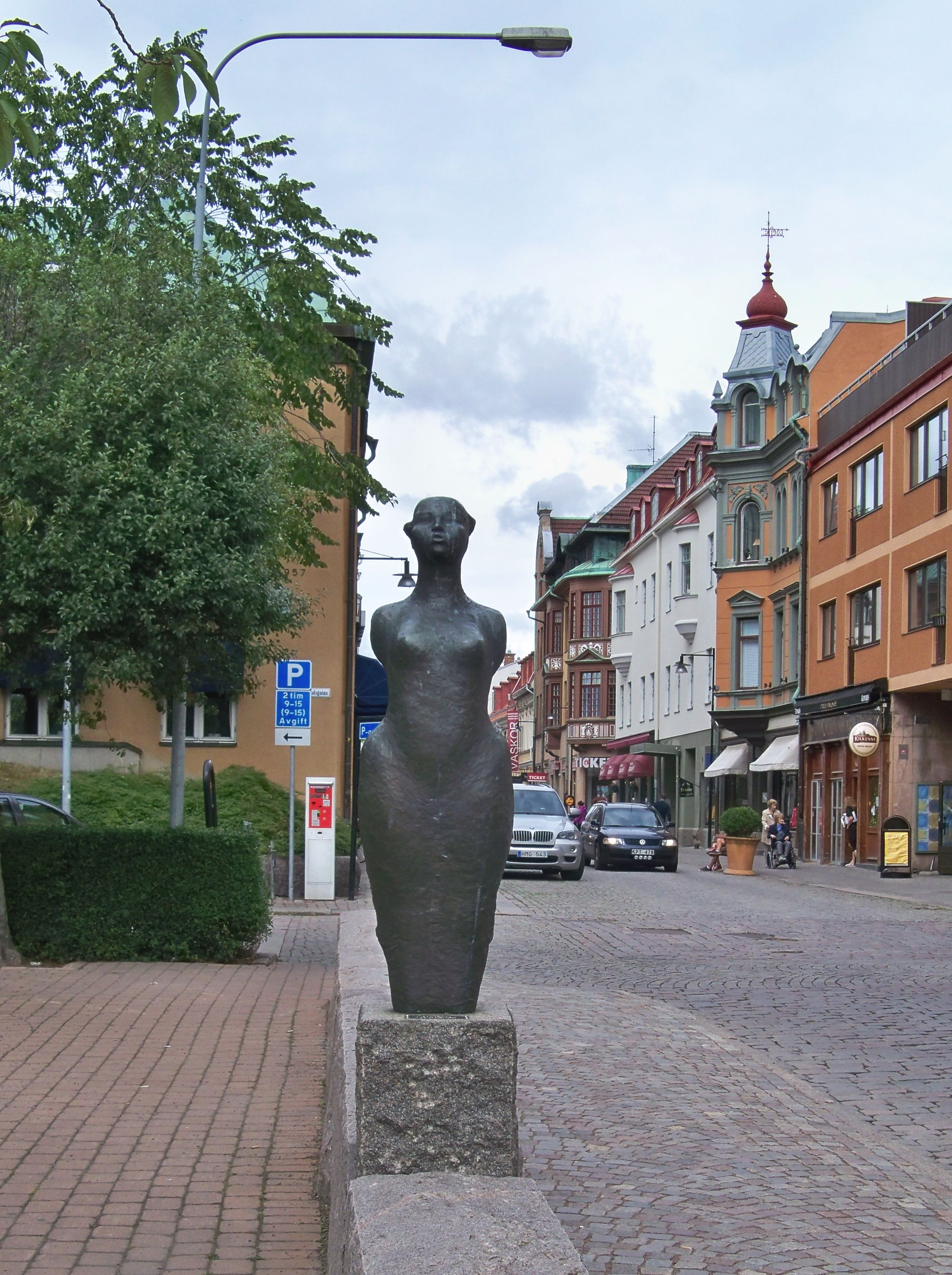
Mermaid sculpture Kalmar

== Transport ==
Kalmar Airport is located 5 km west of downtown Kalmar, the airport provides direct routes to Stockholm which are operated by Scandinavian Airlines.

== Sports ==
The following sports clubs are located in Kalmar:

- Kalmar FF
- Kalmar HC
- Lindsdals IF
- Kalmar AIK
- IFK Berga
- IFK Kalmar
- Kalmar Södra IF
- Kalmar BTK

== Notable people ==
- Mikael Adolphson – historian
- Charlotta Djurström – theatre director
- Lena Hallengren – politician, Minister for Health and Social Affairs
- Richard Hobert – film director
- Helena Josefsson – musician, lead singer in Sandy Mouche
- Ivar Kreuger – civil engineer and industrialist
- Jangir Maddadi – designer living in Kalmar
- Margaret I of Denmark - ruler who here created the Kalmar Union
- Carl Gustaf Mosander – chemist who discovered lanthanum, erbium, terbium
- Anna-Stina Nilstoft – painter
- Jenny Nyström – painter and illustrator
- Pehr Olsson – farmer and politician
- Henrik Strindberg – composer
- Hans Villius – historian

== Twin towns – sister cities ==
Kalmar is twinned with eleven cities:

- Árborg, Iceland
- Arendal, Norway
- Entebbe, Uganda
- Gdańsk, Poland
- Kaliningrad, Russia
- Panevėžys, Lithuania
- Samsun, Turkey
- Savonlinna, Finland
- Silkeborg, Denmark
- Wilmington, United States
- Wismar, Germany

== See also ==
- Kalmar Municipality
- Kalmar Verkstad
- Spawn of Possession
- Linnaeus University
- Kalmar Nyckel, historical ship named after the city of Kalmar
- Kalmar FF, premier division football club from the city
- Ragnarök
