= Diocese of Kalmar =

Coordinates: 56°39′53″N 16°22′01″E

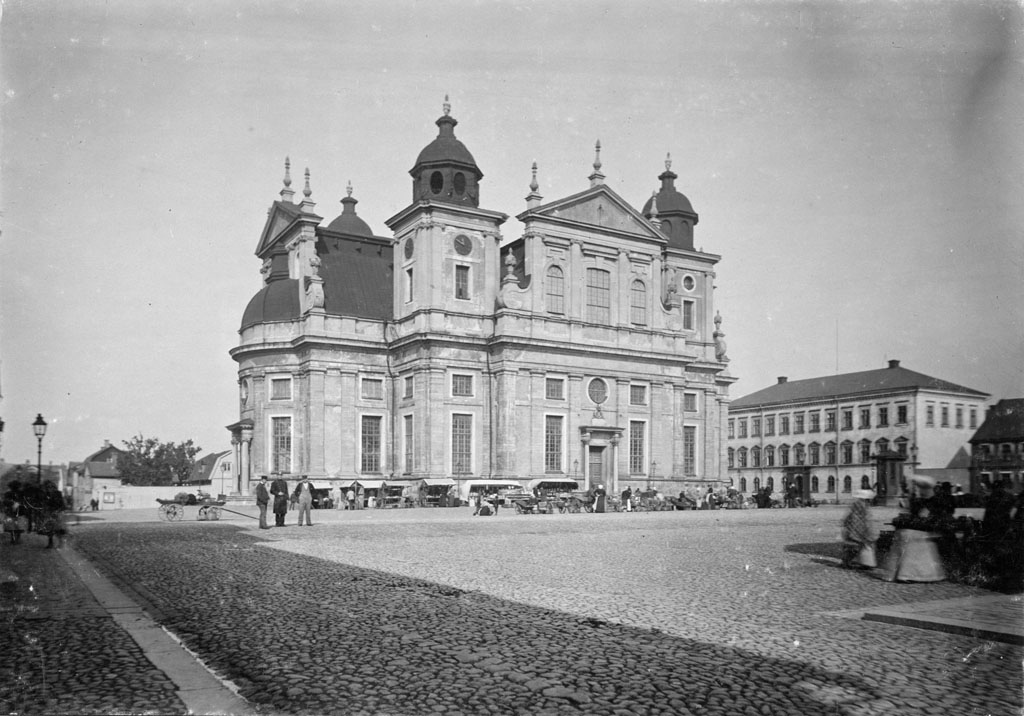

The Diocese of Kalmar (Swedish: Kalmar stift) was a division of the Church of Sweden between 1603 and 1915, when it was merged into the diocese of Växjö in order to allow the new diocese of Luleå to be formed. It was created as a subdivision to the diocese of Linköping, and was under the supervision of a superintendent. Only in 1678 was a bishop appointed, and Kalmar cathedral became an episcopal see in the term proper. Till this day, the cathedral of Kalmar retain its rank despite no longer being the seat of a bishopric.
