= Samuel Troilius =

Swedish archbishop

The Most Reverend Samuel Troilius
- Archbishop of Uppsala; Primate of Sweden
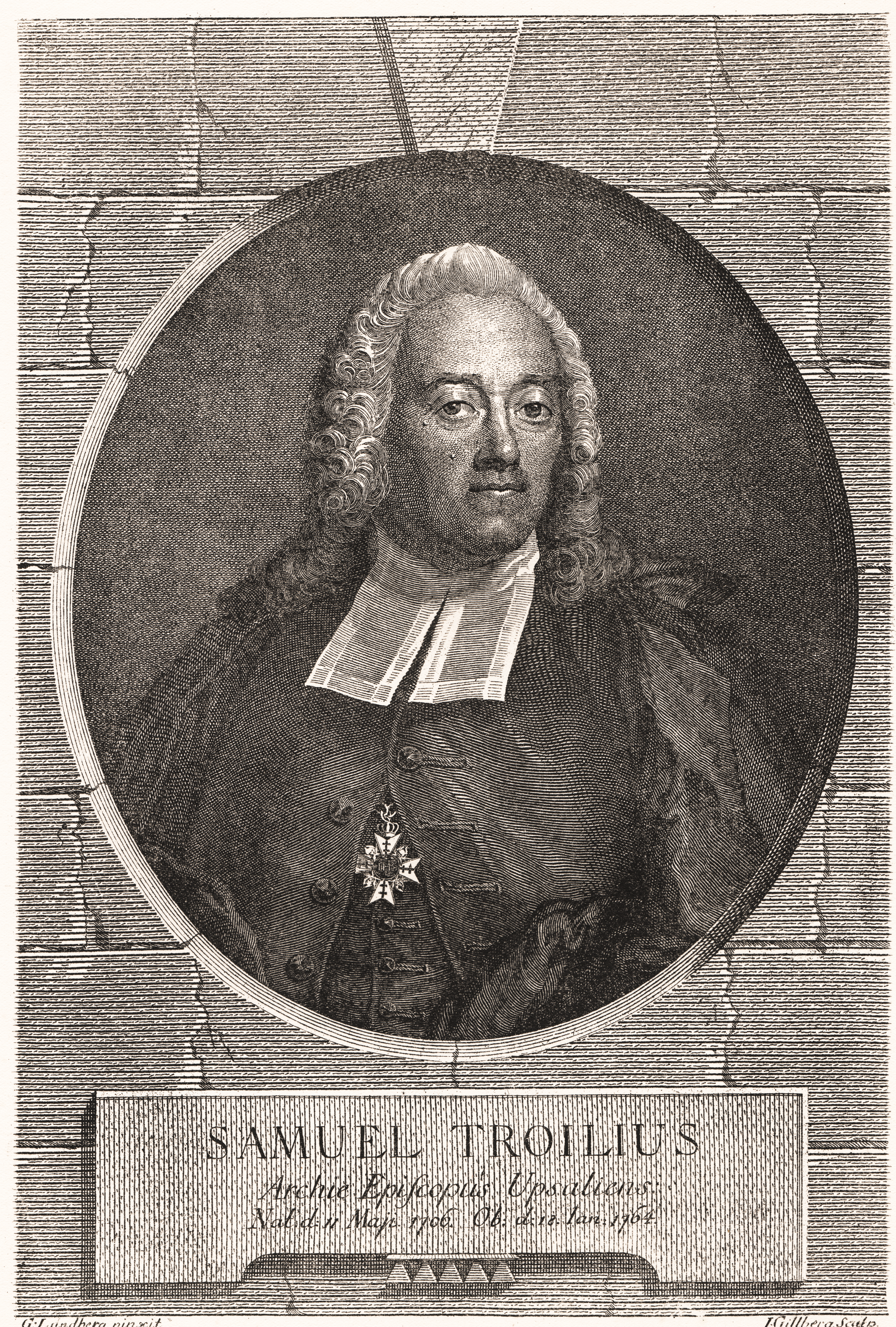
- Church: Church of Sweden
- Archdiocese: Uppsala
- Appointed: 1760
- Term ended: 18 January 1764
- Predecessor: Henric Benzelius
- Successor: Magnus Beronius
- Previous posts: Bishop of Västerås (1751–1760)

Orders
- Ordination: 1736
- Consecration: 1751 by Henric Benzelius
- Rank: Metropolitan Archbishop

Personal details
- Born: 22 May 1706 Stora Skedvi, Sweden
- Died: 18 January 1764 (aged 57) Uppsala, Sweden
- Buried: Västerås Cathedral
- Denomination: Lutheran
- Parents: Olof Troilius and Helena Gangia
- Spouse: Anna Elisabeth Angerstein 1st marriage Brita Elisabeth Silfverstolpe 2nd marriage
- Children: Uno von Troil
- Education: Uppsala University

Samuel Troilius (22 May 1706 – 18 January 1764) was Archbishop of Uppsala from 1758 to his death.

== Biography ==
Samuel Troilius was born on 22 May 1706 in Stora Skedvi parish in the province of Dalarna. His parents were Olof Troilius and Helena Gangia. His father was a vicar in the Church of Sweden.

In 1724, he was studying at Uppsala University, and was by 1734 appointed assistant professor of Greek and Roman literature, after publishing his thesis in 1732 "De magnetismo morum naturali".

He was ordained in 1736 and in 1740 he became a priest.

Troilius moved to Stockholm in 1740 as court chaplain, and the following year became the confessor of the Swedish Royal Family. In 1751, he was unanimously elected new Bishop of Västerås following the death of Andreas Kallsenius.

In 1760, after the death of Henric Benzelius, he was elected Archbishop of Uppsala. In 1760, Troilius also was elected a member of the Royal Swedish Academy of Sciences. Also in that year, he acquired the ironworks at Vira Bruk from his brother-in-law.

He died on 18 January 1764.

== Marriages ==
His marriages were with Anna Elisabeth Angerstein in 1740 and with Brita Elisabet Silfverstolpe in 1751. In 1756, he and his descendants were ennobled under the surname von Troil. His son Uno von Troil (1746–1803) also served as Archbishop of Uppsala.

== See also ==
- List of Archbishops of Uppsala

Preceded by Henrik Benzelius	Archbishop of Uppsala; 1758–1764	Succeeded by Magnus Beronius
