= Jeffrey Mass =

American historian (1940–2001)

Academic background
- Education: Hamilton College (BA); New York University (MA); Yale University (PhD)

Academic work
- Discipline: History
- Sub-discipline: History of Japan
- Institutions: Stanford University
- Doctoral students: Mikael Adolphson, Karl Friday, Joan R. Piggott

Jeffrey Paul Mass (June 29, 1940 – March 30, 2001) was an American academic, historian, author and Japanologist. He was Yamato Ichihashi Professor of Japanese History at Stanford University.

== Early life ==
Mass was born in New York City in 1940. He earned a bachelor's degree in history from Hamilton College in 1961, a master's degree in history from New York University in 1965, and he received his doctorate in history from Yale in 1971.

== Career ==
Mass joined the Stanford University faculty in 1973. He was made a full professor in 1981.

After 1987, he spent the late spring and summer of each year teaching at Oxford University.

During many years, his research was supported by a Fulbright Research Fellowship, a Mellon Fellowship and a Guggenheim Fellowship, and other grants.

== Selected works ==
In an overview of writings by and about Mass, OCLC/WorldCat lists roughly 30+ works in 110+ publications in 3 languages and 5,000+ library holdings.

This list is not finished; you can help Wikipedia by adding to it.

- Warrior government in early medieval Japan: a study of the Kamakura Bakufu, shugo and jitō, 1974
- The Kamakura bakufu: a study in documents, 1976
- The development of Kamakura rule, 1180-1250: a history with documents, 1979
- Court and Bakufu in Japan: essays in Kamakura history, 1982
- The Bakufu in Japanese history, 1985
- Lordship and inheritance in Early Medieval Japan: a study of the Kamakura Soryō system, 1989
- Antiquity and anachronism in Japanese history, 1992
- The origins of Japan's medieval world: courtiers, clerics, warriors, and peasants in the fourteenth century, 1997
- Yoritomo and the founding of the first Bakufu: the origins of dual government in Japan, 1999
