= Edward Kamens =

Edward Kamens (born 19 April 1952) is Sumitomo Professor of Japanese Literature at Yale University, where he has taught since 1986. His dissertation focused on the Buddhist setsuwa collection Sanbōe, and more recently he has written on allusive or intertextual language in premodern literature, particularly utamakura in waka. He was Master of Saybrook College and is now a fellow of the Whitney Humanities Center. Professor Kamens and his wife, art history professor and former Saybrook College Master and current Yale College Dean Mary Miller, are rumored to appear as extras in Indiana Jones and the Kingdom of the Crystal Skull, part of which was filmed at Yale.

== Education ==
BA, Yale University, 1974

MA, Yale University, 1979

M. Phil, Yale University, 1980

PhD, Yale University, 1982

== Major publications ==
- Utamakura, Allusion and Intertextuality in Traditional Japanese Poetry. New Haven: Yale University Press, 1997.
- "Dragon-Girl, Maidenflower, Buddha: The Transformation of a Waka Topos, 'The Five Obstructions'", in Harvard Journal of Asiatic Studies vol. 53 no. 2 (Dec., 1993), pp. 389–442.
- Approaches to Teaching Murasaki Shikibu's The Tale of Genji. (Kamens, ed.) New York: Modern Language Association, 1993.
- The Buddhist Poetry of the Great Kamo Priestess: Daisaiin Senshi and Hosshin Wakashu. Michigan Monograph Series in Japanese Studies, no.5 Center for Japanese Studies, University of *Michigan, Ann Arbor, 1998.
- "The Past in the Present: Fujiwara Teika and the Traditions of Japanese Poetry" and "Translation of Teika's Poems on Flowers and Birds of the Twelve Months", in Word in Flower: The Visualization of Classical Literature in Seveneteenth-Century Japan, Carolyn Wheelwright, editor, Yale University Art Gallery, New Haven.
- The Three Jewels: A Study and Translation of Minamoto Tamenori's Sanboe. Michigan Monograph Series in Japanese Studies, no.2 Center for Japanese Studies, University of Michigan, Ann Arbor.
- "Waking the Dead: Fujiwara Teika's Sotoba kuyo Poems," in Journal of Japanese Studies vol. 28 no. 2 (Summer, 2002)
- Heian Japan, Centers and Peripheries (Mikael Adolphson, Kamens, and Stacie Matsumoto, eds.), Honolulu: University of Hawai'i Press, 2007.

== Honors and Grants ==
- 1998, Hitomi Arisawa Award "for outstanding merit in the field of Japanese studies...", given by the American Association of University Presses for Utamakura, Allusion and Intertextuality in Traditional Japanese Poetry
- 1991-Mellon Fellowship in the Whitney Humanities Center, Yale University
- 1990 summer, A. Whitney Griswold Fund grant for research travel to Japan
- 1989-90 Morse Junior Faculty Fellowship, Yale University
- 1987 summer, Concurrent grants from the Association for Asian Studies, Northeast Asia Council; Enders Fund, Yale Graduate School; and Council on East Asian Studies, Yale University for research in Japan for Buddhist Poetry
- 1984 Association for Asian Studies, Northeast Asian Council Research Grant
- 1980 Japan Foundation Dissertation Grant (research at Waseda University, Tokyo)
- 1977-82 Sumitomo and NDFL (Title VI) Fellowships, Yale University
- 1975 Williams Prize, East Asian Studies, Yale University
