= Anna-Stina Nilstoft =

Swedish painter

Anna-Stina Lorentze Nilstoft
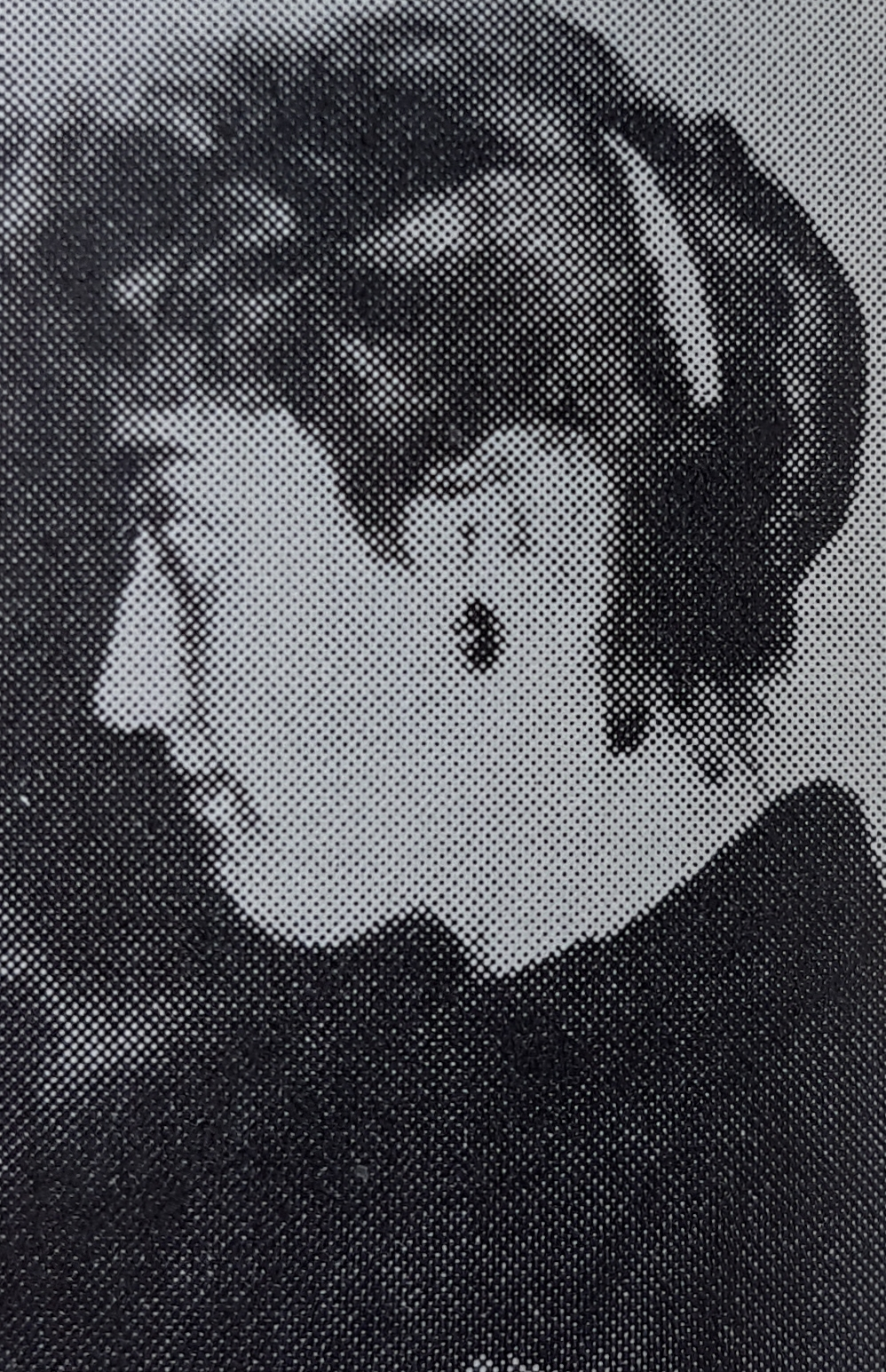
- Born: 15 June 1928; Kalmar, Sweden
- Died: 17 July 2017 (aged 89); Höganäs, Sweden

Anna-Stina Lorentze Nilstoft (1928–2017) was a Swedish painter.

She was born on 15 June 1928, in Kalmar, Sweden. Between 1952 and 1954, she studied at Skånska Målarskolan, the school of fine arts in Malmö, Sweden and continued study from 1955 to 1958 at Marie Wadskjær's School of Painting in Copenhagen, Denmark. She died on 17 July 2017 in Höganäs, Sweden.
