= Jangir Maddadi =

Swedish-Kurdish designer (born 1979)

Jangir Maddadi (born 1979 in Kurdistan), is an industrial designer living in Kalmar, Sweden and the owner of Jangir Maddadi Design Bureau. In 2010, he was awarded the Årets Nybyggare prize by King Carl XVI Gustaf of Sweden for his outstanding entrepreneurial work as an adopted citizen of Sweden.

Maddadi's product lines of contemporary style luxury benches, flowerpots, waste bins, and lamps are primarily geared towards commercial development properties. Products from his first collection, the Union Family, have been sold to clients such as Robert F. and Mary Richardson Kennedy, and to Columbia Pictures for their set of Men in Black 3.

== Early life ==
Maddadi was born in Kurdistan where he lived until he was 13 years old, when the Iran–Iraq War forced him and his family to flee from a refugee camp to Sweden and settle in Kalmar. He attended and graduated from the Linnaeus University School of Design in Pukeberg, Sweden in 2004 and began his company in 2008.

== Awards and Recognitions ==
Maddadi has received several awards and recognitions for his work, including:

- Maddadi is the recipient of the 2010 Årets Nybyggare prize in Sweden.
- German Design Award Winner 2023
- NYC X DESIGN 2021 Winner

The Popsicle bin designed for Trece was awarded these prestigious design awards. The information is from Trece's website. [1]
