= Mikael Adolphson =

Swedish historian of medieval Japan

Mikael "Mickey" Adolphson
- Born: March 10, 1961 (age 65); Kalmar, Sweden
- Other name: ミカエル・アドルフソン

Academic background
- Education: Lund University; Stockholm University; Kyoto University; Stanford University (PhD)

Mikael "Mickey" Adolphson (born March 10, 1961) is a Swedish historian of medieval Japan. Adolphson is the Keidanren Professor of Japanese Studies at the University of Cambridge's Faculty of Asian and Middle Eastern Studies and a Fellow of Trinity College, Cambridge.

== Early life ==
Brought up in Kalmar, Sweden, Adolphson was from a young age inspired to become a historian, influenced by the medieval Kalmar Castle and the many Iron Age and Viking remains on the island of Öland

== Education ==
After graduating from high school in Kalmar the late 1970s, he graduated with a B.A. in History, Museum and Cultural Studies in 1985 from Lund University. A premodernist, he was inspired by the similarities between medieval Europe and Japan to focus his attention on pre-1600 Japan. He spent two years studying Japanese at Stockholm University before receiving a scholarship from the Japanese Education Ministry in 1986.

During the next two and a half years he lived in Kyoto and Osaka while studying at Kyoto University under the guidance of Professor Oyama Kyohei. During that time, he also coached volleyball at Osaka University of Foreign Studies and later at Kyoto University. Upon returning to Sweden, he became the head coach of the KFUM Göteborg women’s team, which took fifth place in the Elite League, in addition to winning several tournaments.

In 1989, he entered Stanford University's Ph.D. program with Professor Jeffrey Mass as his mentor. Returning to Kyoto University in the spring of 1992 for dissertation research, he also worked for the Japan Volleyball Association as an interpreter. He resumed at Stanford in the fall of 1993 and finished his dissertation two years later.

== Career ==
Adolphson’s first academic appointment was at the University of Oklahoma from 1995 to 1999, and then Harvard University, where he was assistant and associate professor of Japanese History. In 2008 he joined the faculty at the University of Alberta as Professor of Japanese Cultural Studies, and served as chair of the Department of East Asian Studies and associate dean in the Faculty of Arts. As associate dean, he founded the first pedagogical research unit for Arts, Humanities and Social Sciences, named the Arts Pedagogy Research and Innovation Laboratory, where one of his project-based courses is featured. Adolphson has been Keidanren Professor of Japanese Studies at Cambridge since January 2016; the post was held previously by Richard Bowring and Peter Kornicki. During his inaugural lecture at Cambridge in October 2016, Adolphson announced the launching of a new vision for Japanese Studies at Cambridge, entitled Japan and the World. In March 2020, he co-founded the Japan Global Research Center in Tokyo, which aims to connect Japanese and Cambridge researchers through large and collaborative projects. Adolphson is a Fellow and Special Advisor at the Swedish Collegium for Advanced Study.

== Selected works ==
- Mikael S. Adolphson, The Gates of Power: Monks, Courtiers and Warriors in Premodern Japan (University of Hawai'i Press, 2000)
- Mikael S. Adolphson, The Teeth and Claws of the Buddha: Monastic Warriors and Sōhei in Japanese History (University of Hawai'i Press, 2007)
- Mikael S. Adolphson, Edward Kamens and Stacie Matsumoto, eds., Heian Japan, Centers and Peripheries (University of Hawai'i Press, 2007)
- Mikael S. Adolphson and Anne Commons, eds., Lovable Losers: The Heike in Action and Memory (University of Hawai'i Press, 2015)
