= Kalmar BTK =

Table tennis club in Kalmar, Sweden

- Full name: Kalmar bordtennisklubb
- Sport: table tennis
- Founded: 14 June 1960
- Based in: Kalmar, Sweden
- Arena: JO Waldnerhallen

Kalmar BTK is a table tennis club in Kalmar, Sweden. Established on 14 June 1960, the club won the Swedish national men's team championship in 1996, 1999, 2000 and 2002. Jan-Ove Waldner played for the club between 1996 and 2006.
