= Stora Skedvi =

District in Säter Municipality, Sweden

Coordinates: 60°24′N 15°48′E

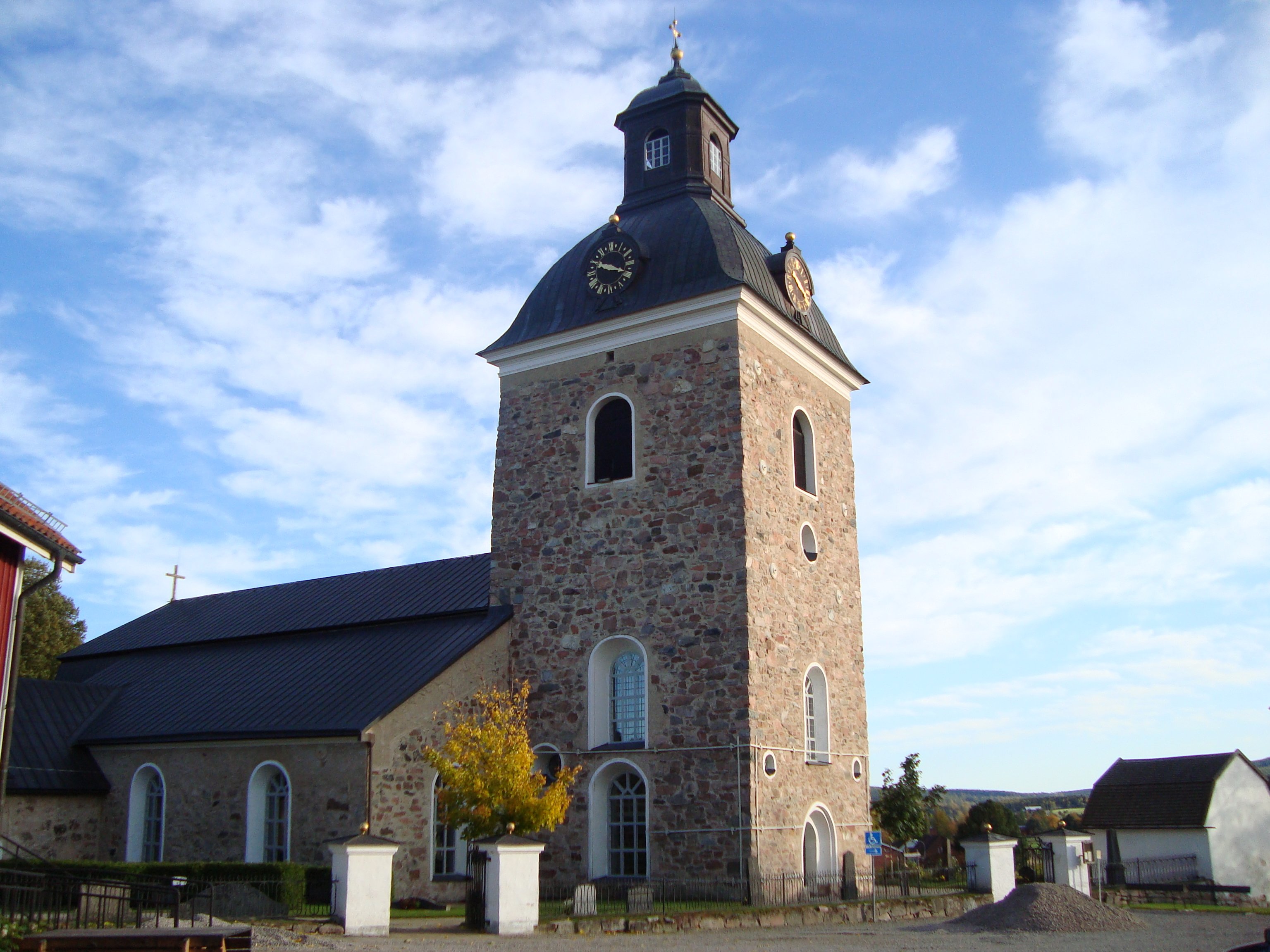
Stone church at Stora Skedvi

Stora Skedvi is a part of Säter Municipality located by the Dal River in Sweden. About 2,300 people live here. Major companies are Vika Bröd, Stocksbroverken and MEAG. It is known for its 12th-century church with its beautiful ceiling paintings.
