= Kalmar Cathedral =

- Kalmar domkyrka
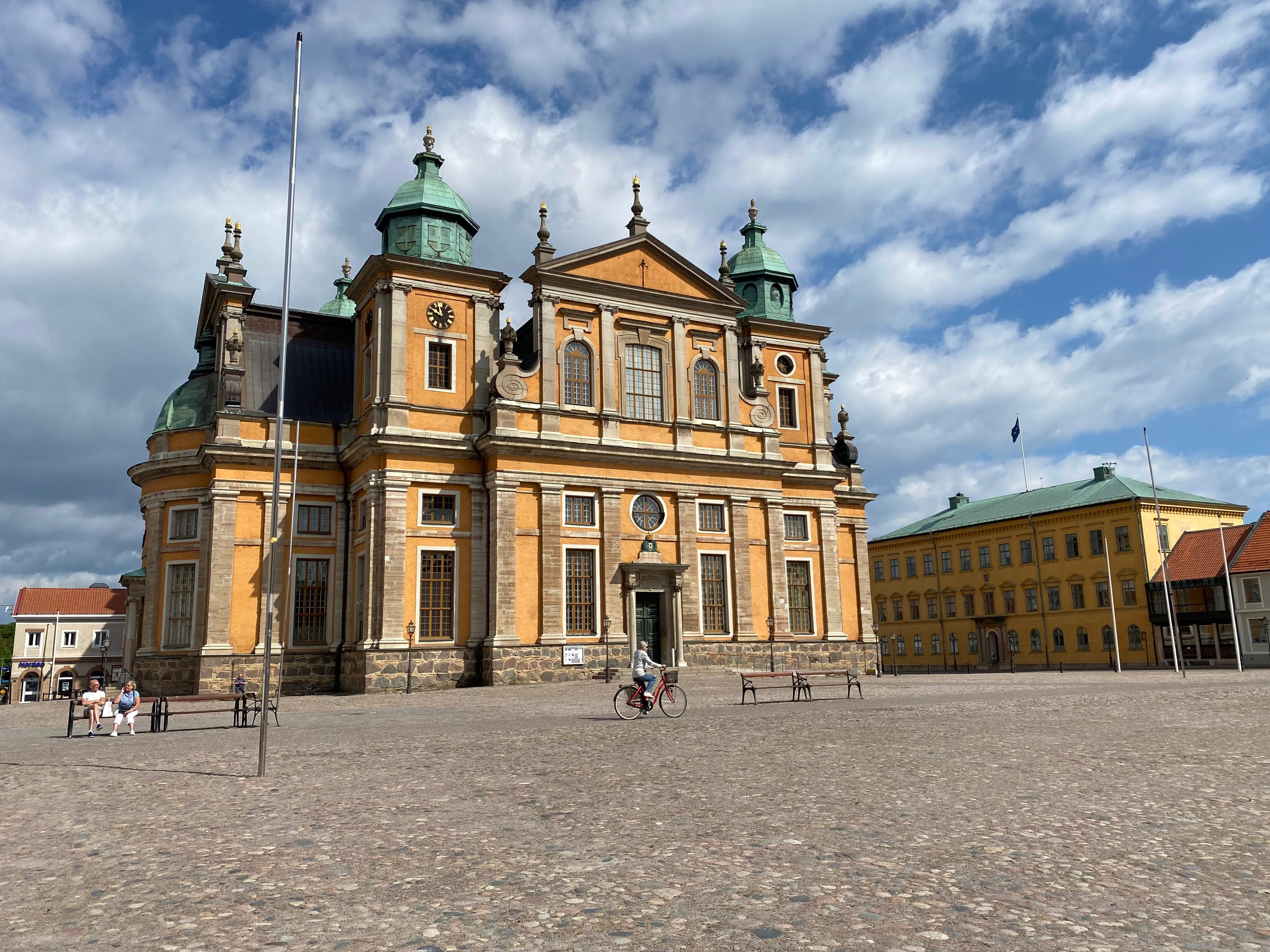
- Kalmar Cathedral viewed from the square
- Kalmar Cathedral
- 56°39′52″N 16°21′55″E
- Location: Kalmar
- Country: Sweden
- Denomination: Church of Sweden

History
- Status: Active
- Consecrated: 1682

Architecture
- Functional status: Cathedral & Parish church
- Architect: Nicodemus Tessin the Elder
- Style: Baroque
- Completed: 1703

Administration
- Diocese: Växjö

Clergy
- Vicar: Peter Wänehag
- Dean: Christer Munther

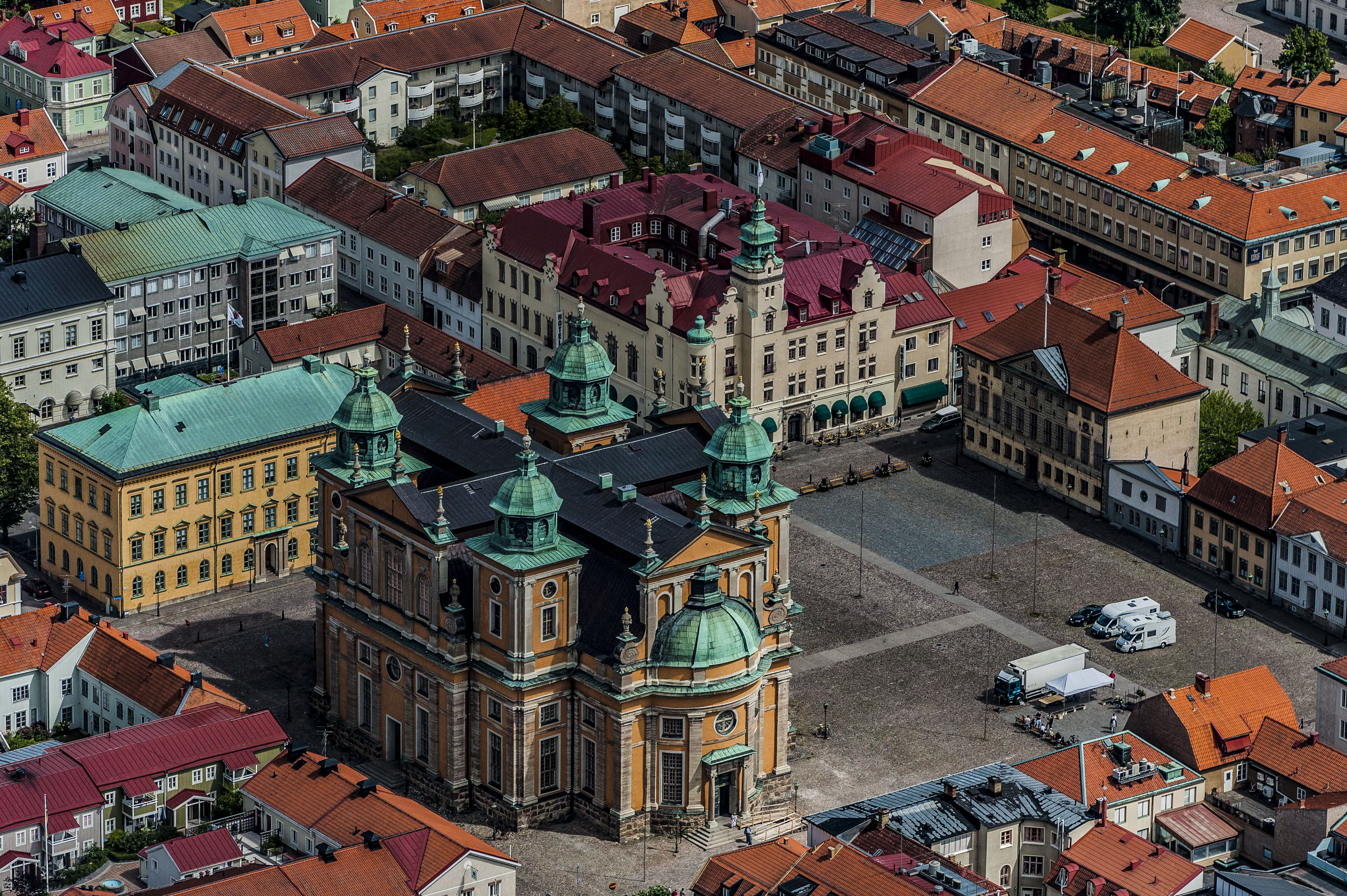
Aerial photo of Kalmar Cathedral.

Kalmar Cathedral (Swedish: Kalmar domkyrka) is a cathedral in the city of Kalmar, Småland, in southeastern Sweden. Located at Stortorget, construction began in 1660. The cathedral was designed for the Church of Sweden by architect Nicodemus Tessin the Elder.

== History ==
The new city of Kalmar was built on Kvarnholmen island in the mid-17th century. The transfer from the old town was largely completed by 1658. The new, fortified town was planned along Renaissance ideals. Accordingly, the church and town hall were constructed across from one another in the old town square (Stortorget Kalmar). The material in the masonry consists of limestone from Gotland. The vaults, portals and window coverings are made of brick. The roof was lined with copper plate. The cathedral was built without a dome and with high window openings.

The cathedral was designed by Nicodemus Tessin the Elder (1615–1681) and is one of the foremost examples of classical baroque architecture that was a breakthrough in Sweden. The design of Kalmar Cathedral reflects the complexities of modernisation, maintaining liturgical utility and tradition, and being mindful of the fortress-city requirements. Construction began in 1660, but was interrupted on several occasions, including with the outbreak of the Scanian War (1675–1679). The work resumed after the war and Kalmar Cathedral was finally finished in 1703.

== Restorations ==
Over the centuries, the church has been the subject of numerous restorations.

In 1783, extensive external and internal restoration was initiated. In 1800, the city was hit by an extensive fire. In 1802, the damage was repaired. In 1831–1834, an external and internal restoration was carried out following a proposal by architect Jacob Wilhelm Gerss (1784–1844). The exterior restoration included both the church's exterior walls and the roof.

In 1882–1883, the interior was rebuilt following a proposal by architect Helgo Zetterwall (1831–1907). During 1910–1914, restoration took place according to drawings and job descriptions by city architect Josef Fredrik Olson (1870–1947). The 1928–1932 restoration was also based on Fredrik Olson's proposal.

Between 1981 and 1982, extensive restoration of the church's exterior was carried out. Between 2005 and 2011, restoration of the exterior took place under the direction of Barup & Edström Arkitektkontor. Work included refurbishment of the church roof, stone restoration, and facade staining. Internal restoration during 2006–2011 included, among other things, raising and expanding the choir, as well as installing new flooring.

== Gallery ==
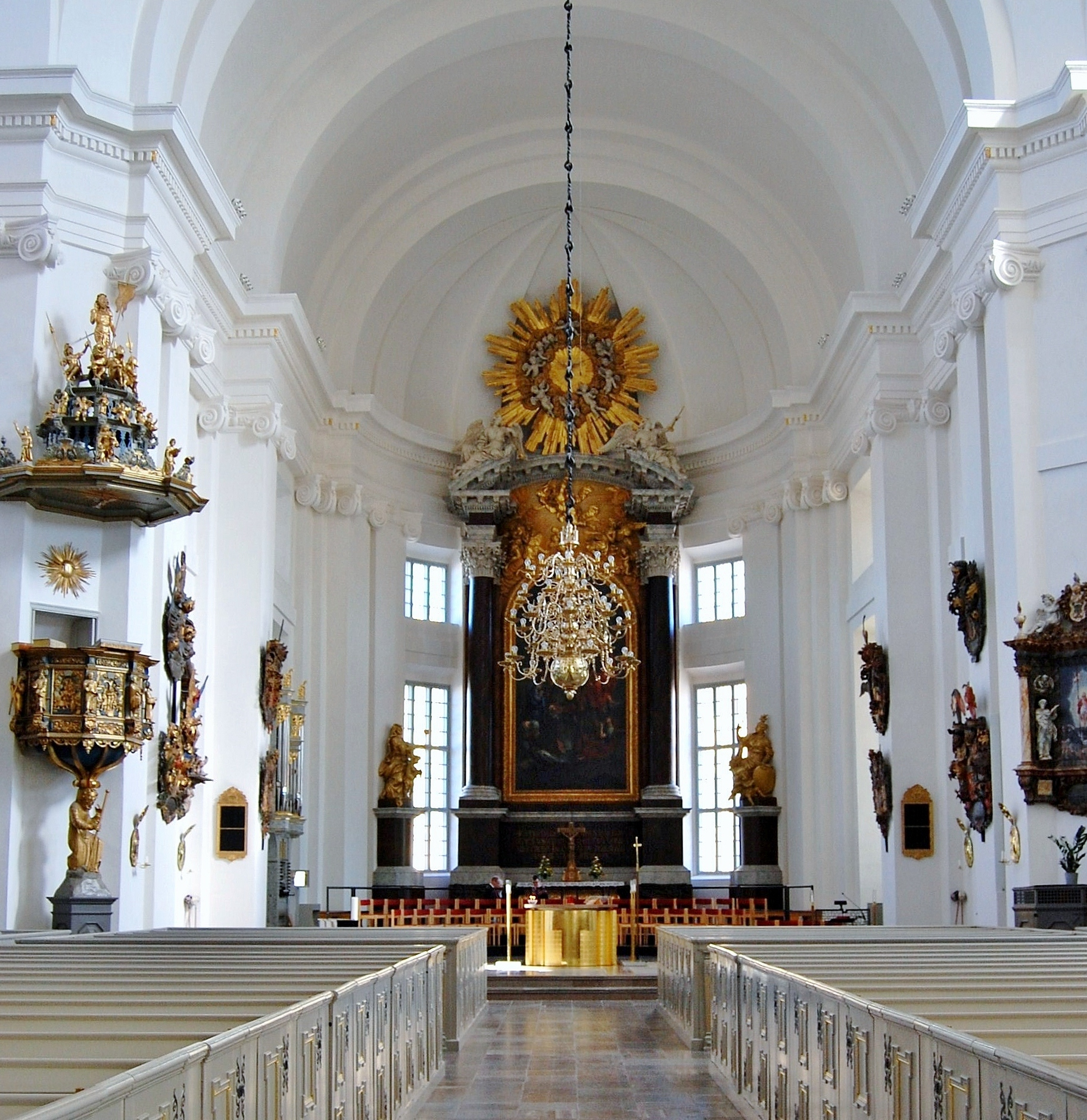
Interior

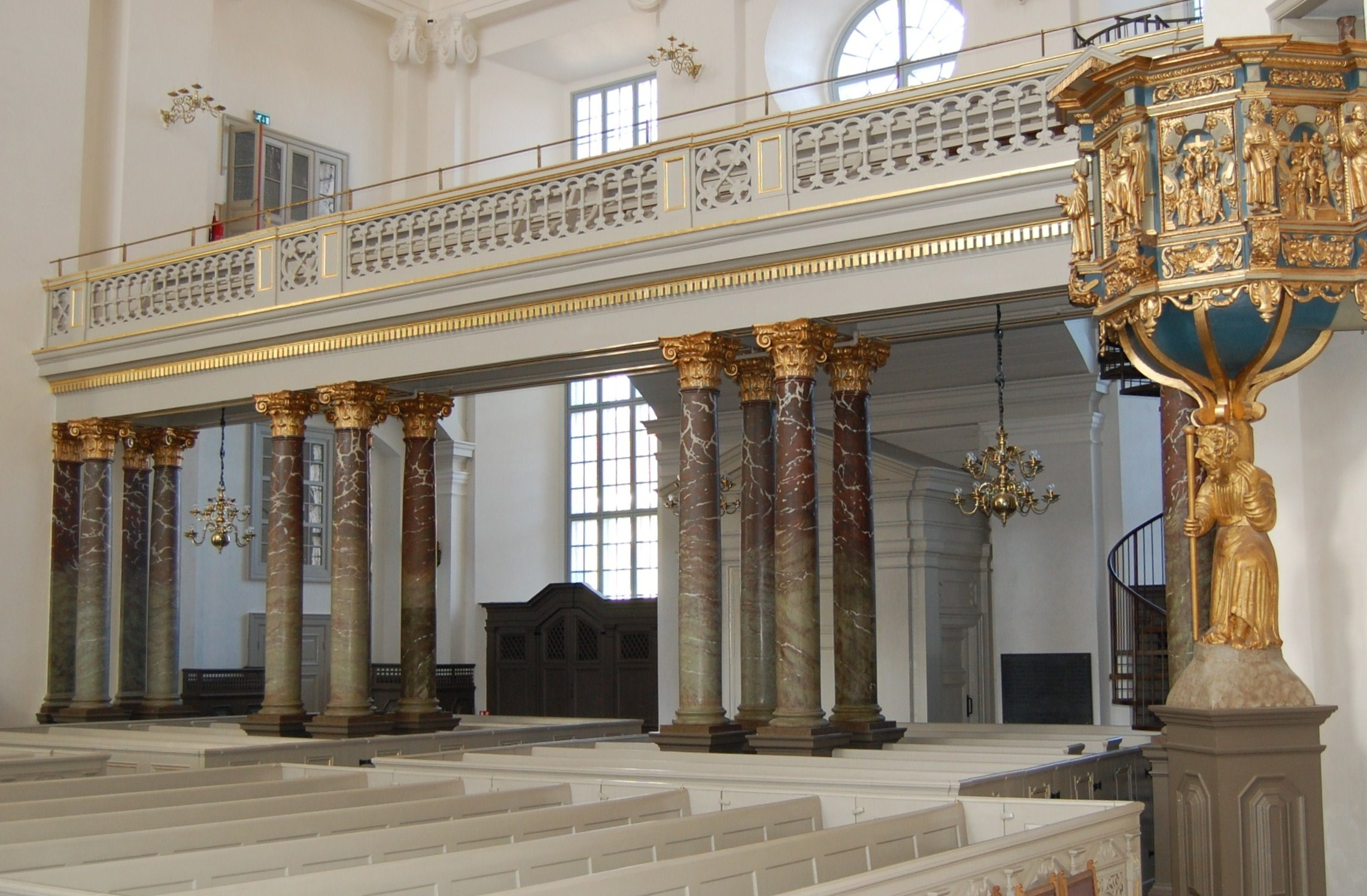
Northern gallery

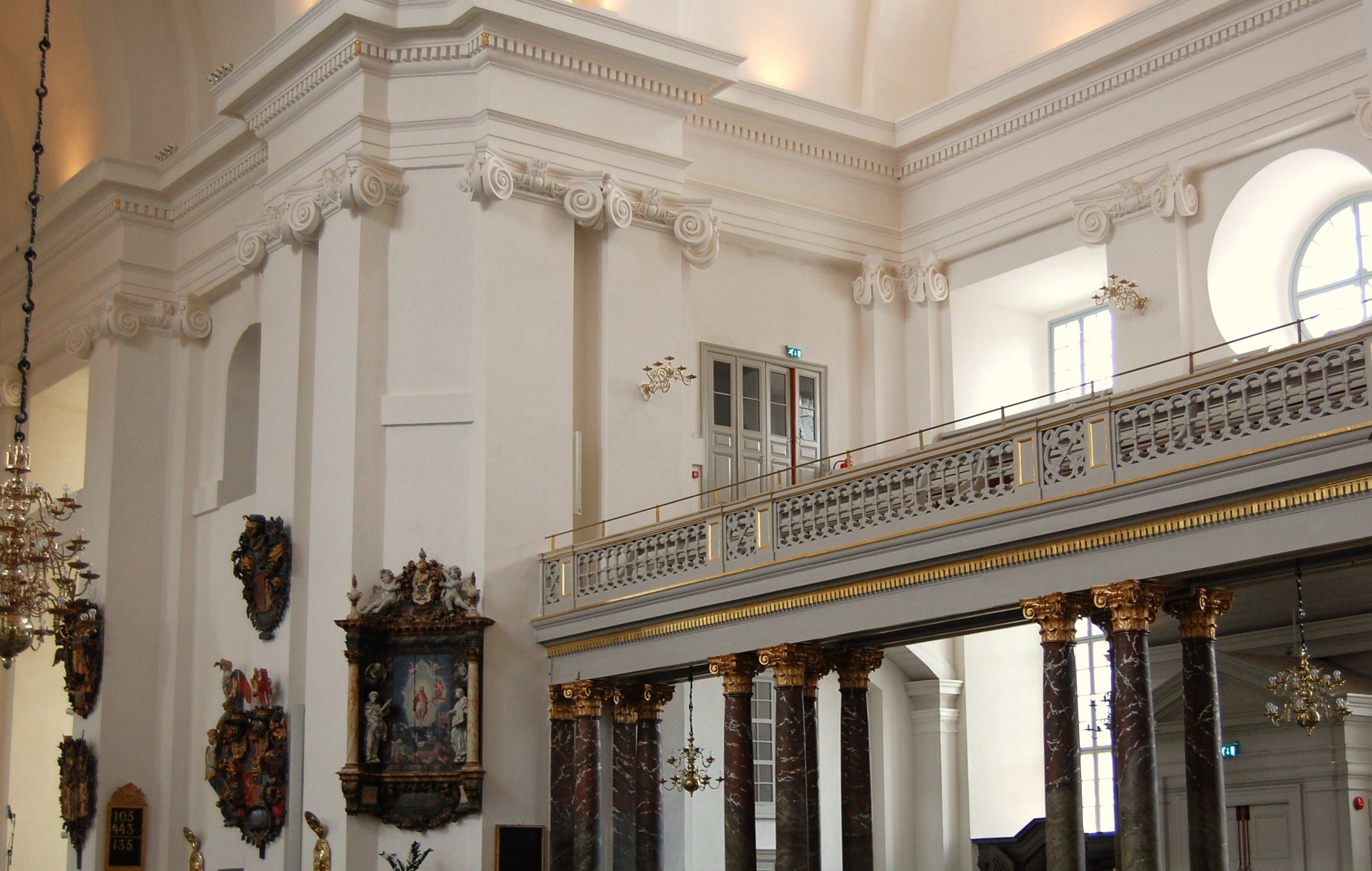
Southern gallery

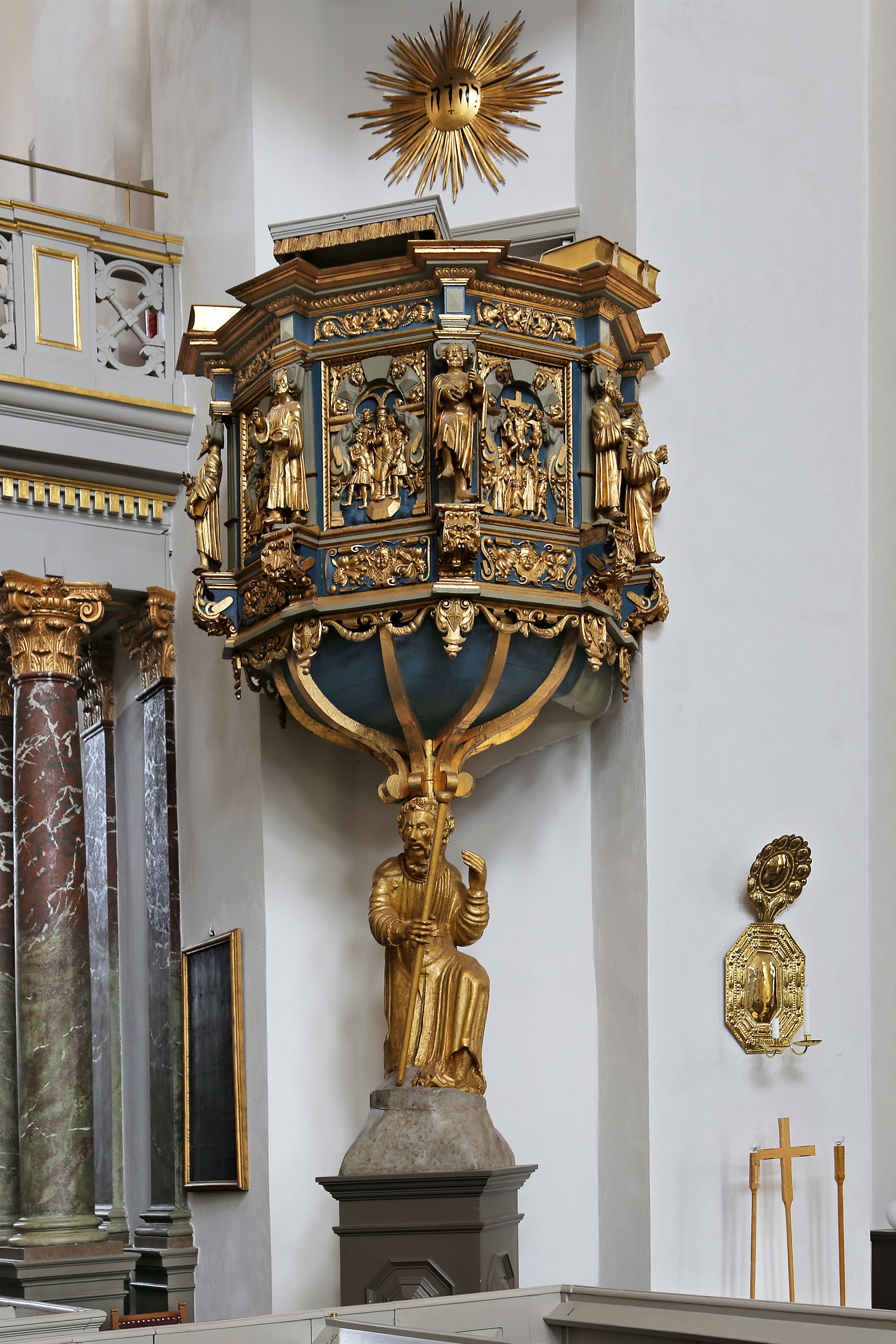
Ornate pulpit

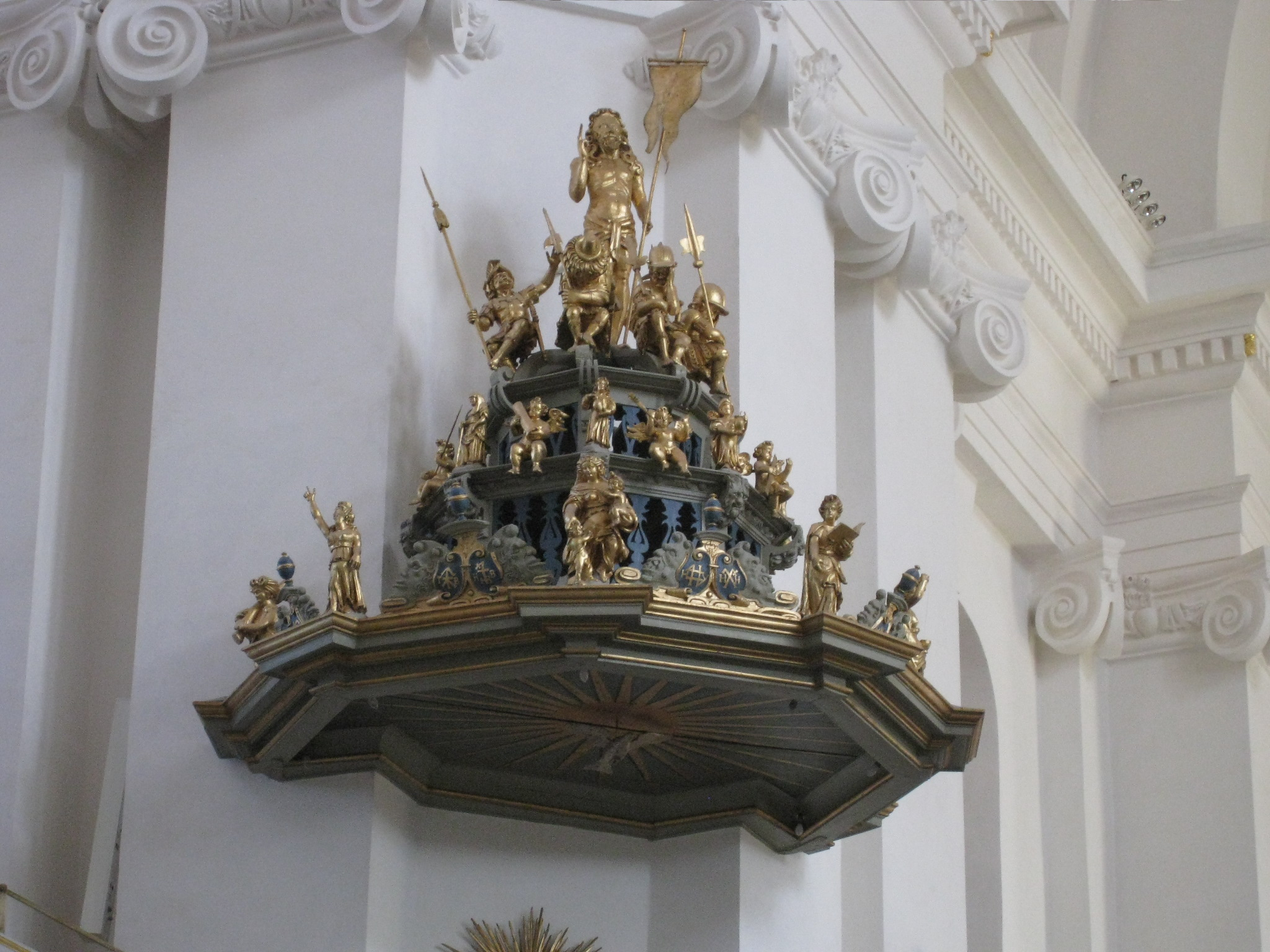
Pulpit sounding board or tester

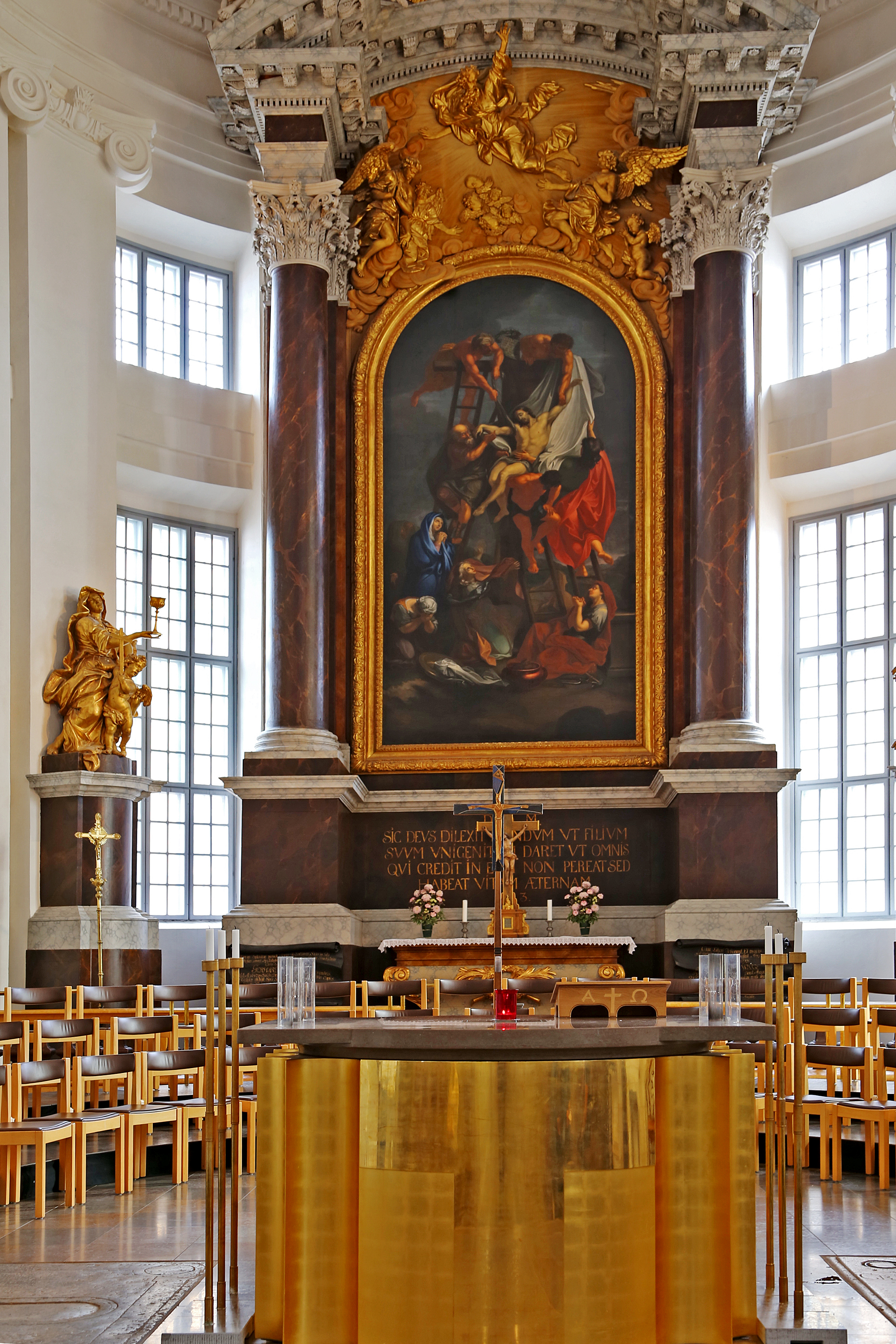
Altar

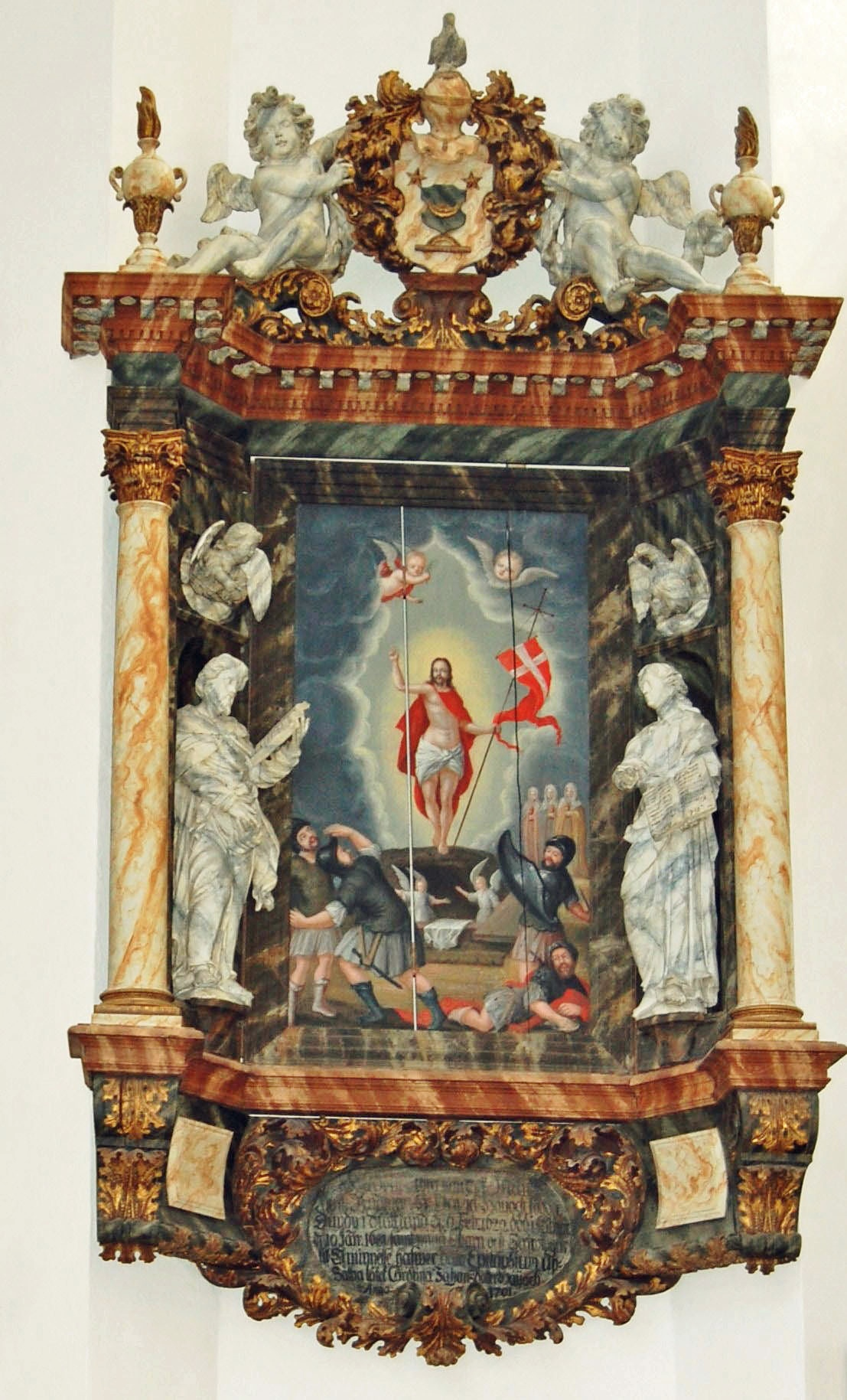
Wall-mounted memorial

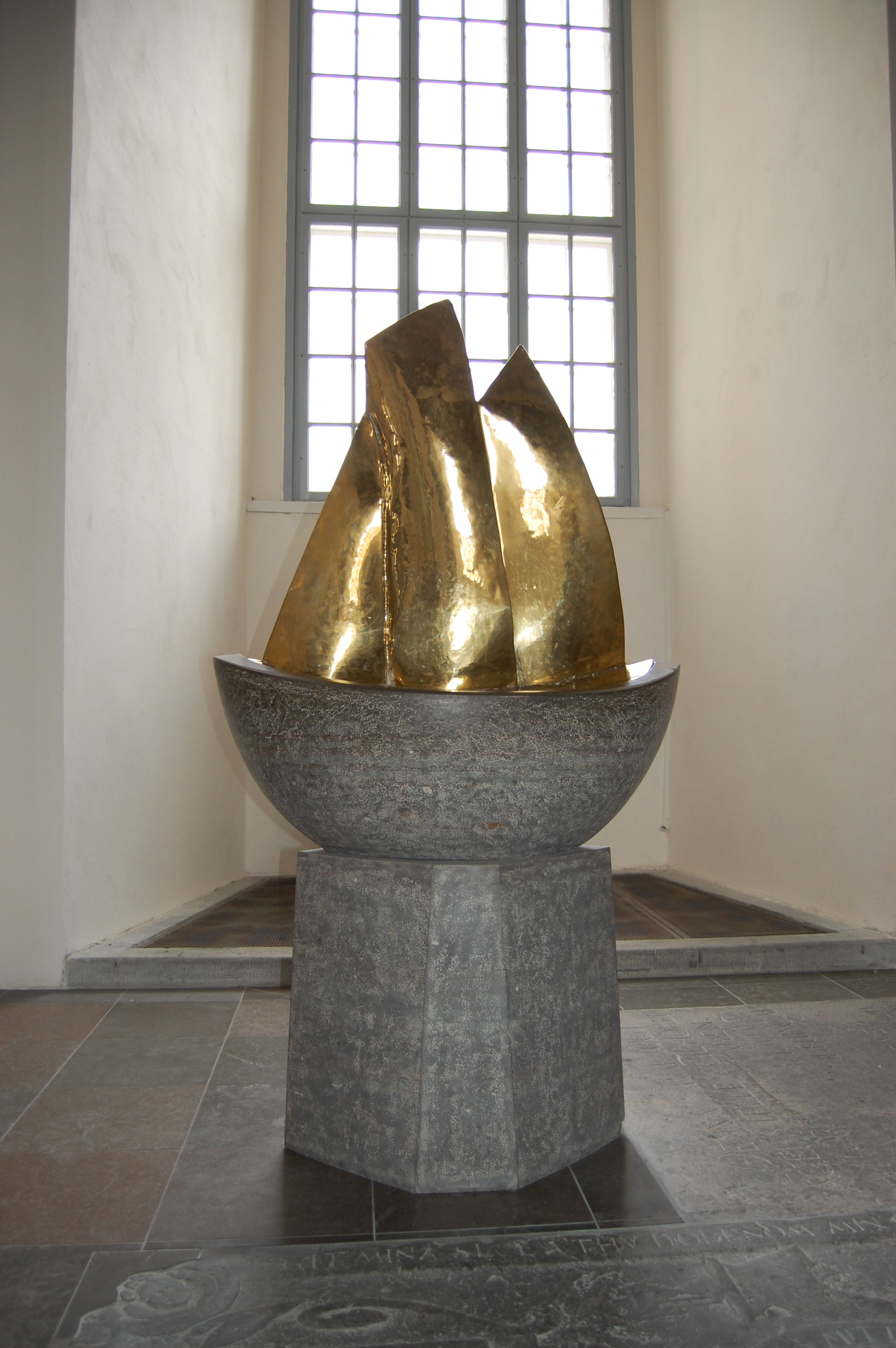
Baptismal font made by stonecutter Elving Nilsson

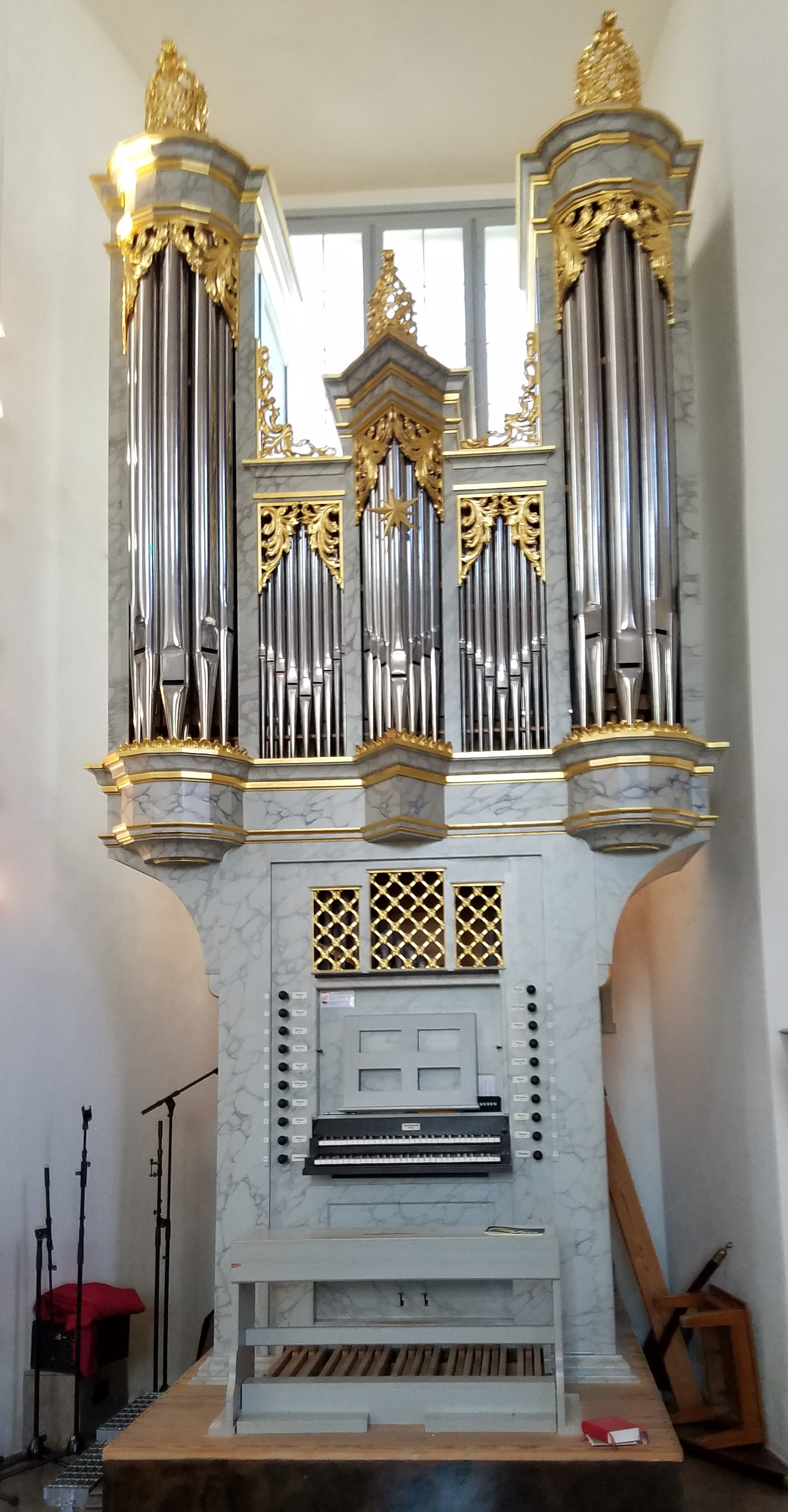
Organ
