= Angerstein family =

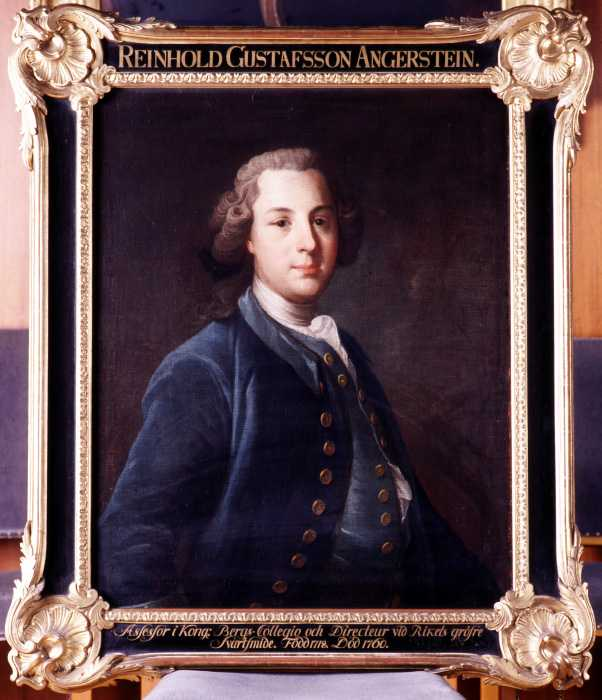
Reinhold Angerstein (1718–1760), in portrait (circa 1755) by Olof Arenius.

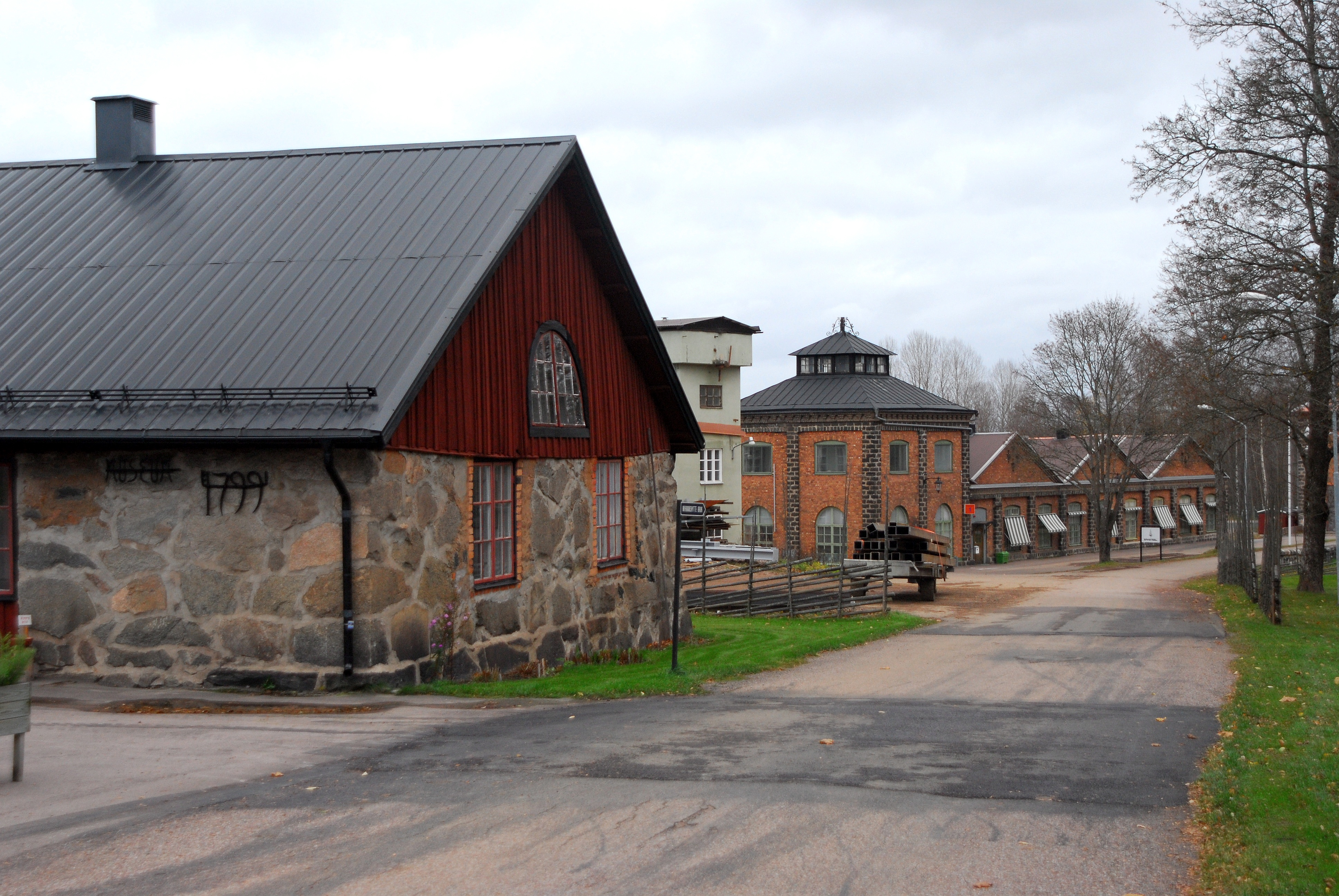
Entrance to the Steelworks of Vikmanshyttan, transformed into a museum of regional industrial history in 1981.

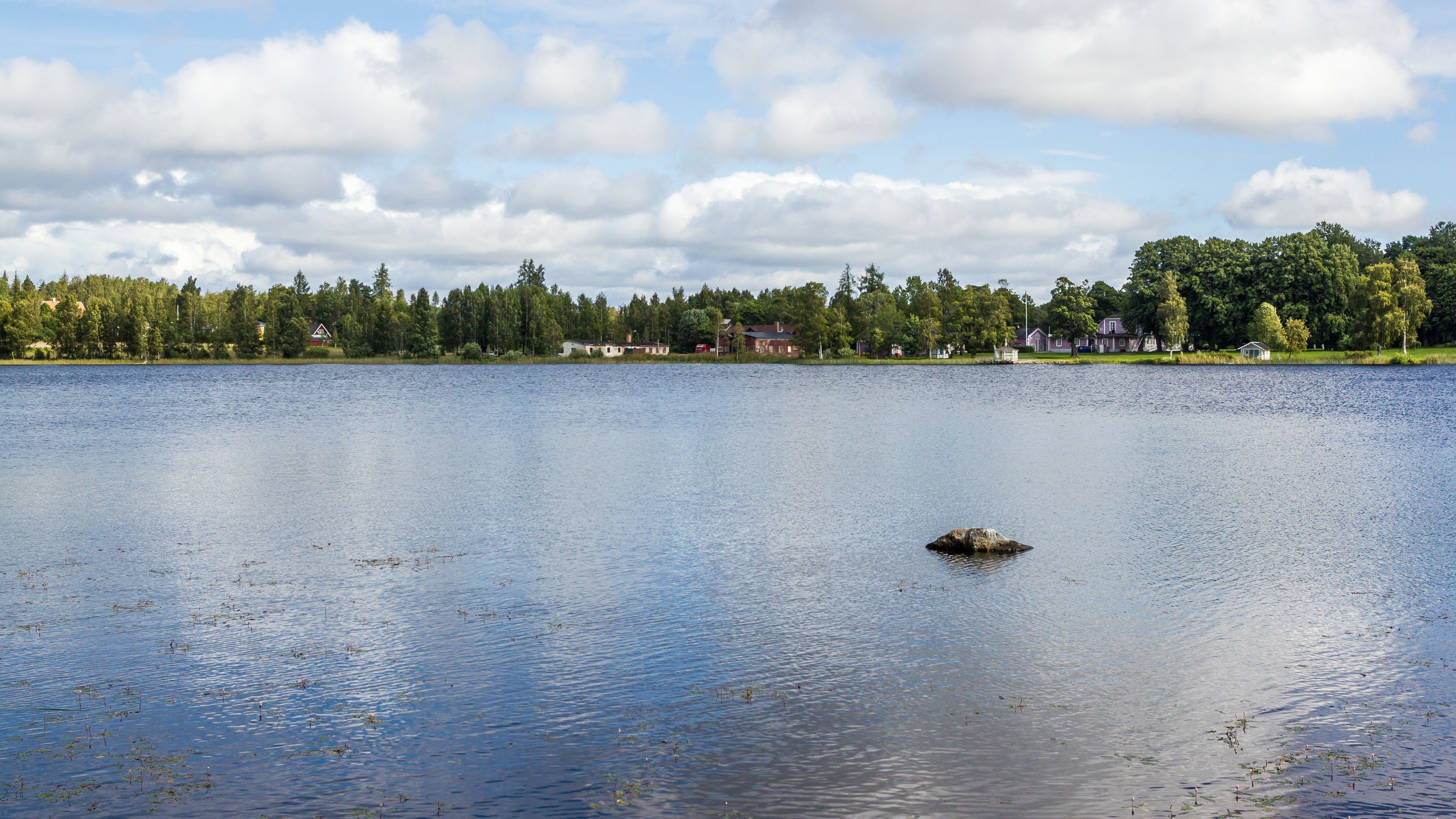
The mansion of Vikmanshyttan.

The Angerstein family is a German-Swedish family from Angerstein, Niedersachsen, Holy Roman Empire, with indications of ultimate origins from Hungary.

The Swedish branch immigrated through Anders Angerstein (1614-1659), along with accompanying smiths. In time, Anders Angerstein settled by the Angerstein forge in Vikmanshyttan, Dalarna. His issue extended the holdings, including Vira bruk, Thurbo, and Bispberg, inter alia, with craft production authorisation by the Swedish Board of Mines, remaining in the family until the 19th century. Donations were extended to cultural heritage protected interiors of the Hedemora church in the Diocese of Västerås.

In 1981, the former Angerstein steelworks were transformed into the Steelworks Museum of Vikmanshyttan, maintained as a museum of regional industrial history.

== Members in selection ==
- Anders Angerstein (1614-1659), German-Swedish ironmaster
- sv:Johan Angerstein (1646-1716), Swedish ironmaster
- Johan Angerstein (1672-1720), Swedish assessor
- Reinhold Angerstein (1718–1760), Swedish metallurgist, and entrepreneur
- sv:Uno Angerstein (1808-1874), Swedish officer, industrialist, artist

== See also ==
- Angersteingatan, Solhaga
