= Abraham Hülphers the Elder =

Swedish industrialist (1704–1770)

Abraham Hülphers
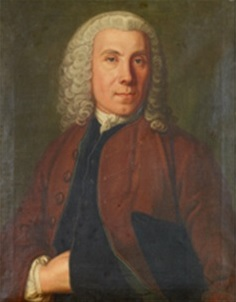
- Abraham Danielsson Hülphers (1704–1770).

Member of the Swedish Parliament for Västerås
- In office 4 December 1740 – 3 October 1765

Personal details
- Born: 31 March 1704 Hedemora, Dalarna, Sweden
- Died: 26 November 1770 (aged 66) Västerås, Västmanland, Sweden
- Resting place: Västerås Cathedral
- Party: Caps
- Spouse: Christina (née Westdahl)
- Children: 13, including Abraham Hülphers the Younger
- Relatives: Petrus Petri Torpensis (great-grandfather), Anders Angerstein (great-grandfather), Olaus Canuti Helsingius (third great-grandfather), Stephanus Olai Bellinus (third great-grandfather), Nils Hülphers (cousin)
- Occupation: Industrialist, politician

Abraham Danielsson Hülphers (31 March 1704 – 26 November 1770), also known as Abraham Hülphers the Elder (Swedish: Abraham Hülphers den äldre), was a Swedish early industrialist, and politician.

Managing several iron works and forges around Bergslagen, he was an important contributor to the development of the early industrial craft production in Sweden. While maintaining extensive commercial enterprises around his home town Västerås, he was also active in the Swedish East India Company, bringing new products to the Swedish market, including tobacco, textiles and wine.

He attended the Riksdag of Sweden five times during 1740–1765, representing the bourgeoisie estate for the Caps party during the Age of Liberty.

== Biography ==
Abraham Danielsson Hülphers was born in 1704 in Hedemora, Dalarna, as a son of the milliner Daniel Johansson Hülphers, and Catharina (née Torpensis).

On his paternal side, his great-grandfather was the ironmaster Hans Hilper, who immigrated to Nyköping circa 1625 from Schmalkalden, Holy Roman Empire. On his maternal side, his great-grandfathers included Petrus Petri Torpensis, and Anders Angerstein. In addition, he was descendant five times removed of Olaus Canuti Helsingius, and Stephanus Olai Bellinus. He was also a cousin of Nils Hülphers.

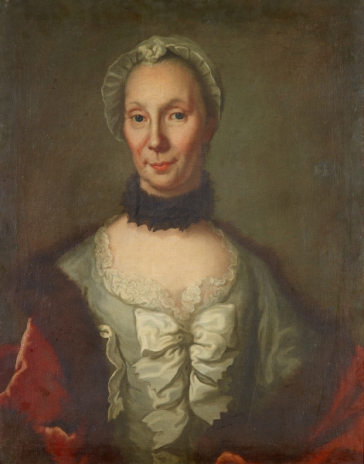
Portrait (c.a 1750) of Abrahams Hülpher's wife, Christina Hülphers (née Westdahl) (1711–1767).

He married Christina (née Westdahl), daughter of the businessman and politician Lars Olofsson Westdahl in Västerås. Together they had 13 children, among them the musicologist Abraham Hülphers the Younger.

After an initial sejour in Stockholm, he settled permanently in Västerås where he was granted commercial privileges, followed by incremental investments alongside political duties.

Besides his commercial interests, he also undertook municipal duties as judge at the city court of Västerås, and attended the Riksdag of Sweden five times during 1740–1765, representing the bourgeoisie estate for the Caps party during the Age of Liberty, which expanded Sweden's economic freedom as well as introduced the world's oldest constitutional implementation of freedom of the press.

With reputed interest in and patronage for the arts and humanities, extending beyond that of his family circles, he issued some 25 000 copper Swedish riksdaler with annual rent designated for widows of Västerås.

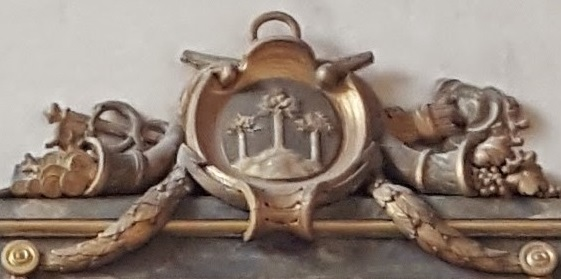
Coat of arms of the Hülphers family with cornucopia supporters atop neoclassical epitaph of Abraham Hülphers the Elder and spouse inside Västerås Cathedral, erected (1772) by Johan Ljung (1717–1787), royal sculptor at Stockholm Palace.

Abraham Danielsson Hülphers died in 1770. He was buried in Västerås Cathedral in the tomb of bishop Olaus Stephani Bellinus, situated between the royal benches, which he as a descendant was granted access to upon request in 1751. An epitaph by the royal sculptor at Stockholm Palace Johan Ljung (1717–1787) was erected in tribute by his issue in 1772, "crowned with the arms of Hülphers surrounded by a caduceus and fasces, symbols for commercial and political duties, as well as two cornucopias, mellifluous with coins and wine grapes."

== Bibliography ==
- Abraham Danielsson Hülphers (p. 42–43) in Tema 1700-talet by Sven Olsson (1914–2006); sv:Västmanlands läns museum
- Graf-skrifter wid herr rådman Abraham Hülphers jorde-färd i Wästerås dom-kyrka den 13 decemb. 1770. Wästerås (1770; Print: Johan Laur. Horrn)
