= Hülphers family =

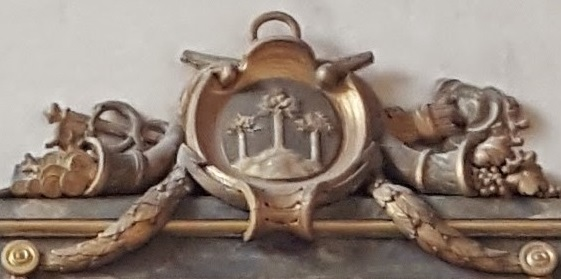
- Coat of arms of atop neoclassical epitaph of Abraham Hülphers the Elder and spouse inside Västerås Cathedral, erected (1772) by Johan Ljung.
- Current region: Sweden
- Origin: Schmalkalden, Thuringia, Holy Roman Empire

The Hülphers family is a German-Swedish family originating from Schmalkalden, Thuringia, Holy Roman Empire.

== History ==
Hans and Jannich Hilper immigrated from Schmalkalden to Sweden circa 1626, engaging in Swedish iron works. A great-grandson of Hans Hilper was the early industrialist Abraham Hülphers the Elder (1704–1770). The family was part of the Swedish nobility.

== Notable members ==
- Abraham Hülphers the Elder (1704–1770), early industrialist, and politician
- Nils Hülphers (1712–1776), politician
- Abraham Hülphers the Younger (1734–1798), topographer, genealogist
- Walter Hülphers (1871–1957), journalist, author
- Gustav Hülphers (1884–1968), professor
- Torsten Hülphers (1901–1965), politician
- Arne Hülphers (1904–1978), pianist, Musical Director
- Greta Hülphers (1904–1995), née Greta Wassberg,singer
- Inger Modin-Hülphers (1906–1956), sculptor
- Zarah Hülphers (1907–1981), née Sara Hedberg, better known as Zarah Leander, singer
