= Angerstein =

Angerstein is a surname. Notable people with the surname include:

== People ==
- Anders Angerstein (1614–1659), German-Swedish ironmaster
- Fritz Angerstein (1891–1925), German mass murderer
- John Angerstein (MP) (c. 1774–1858), English politician and Member of Parliament, son of John Julius
- John Julius Angerstein (1732–1823), London merchant and patron of the fine arts
- Karl Angerstein (1890–1985), senior Luftwaffe officer of World War II
- Reinhold Angerstein (1718–1760), Swedish metallurgist
- William Angerstein (1811–1897), British Liberal Party Member of Parliament

== Families ==
- Angerstein family

== See also ==
- Angerstein Wharf, London
