= Abraham Hülphers =

Abraham Hülphers may refer to:

- Abraham Hülphers the Younger (1734–1798), Swedish writer, musicologist, topographer, and genealogist
- Abraham Hülphers the Elder (1704–1770), his father, Swedish industrialist and politician
