= Petrus Petri Torpensis =

Swedish prelate, vicar and writer

Petrus Petri Torpensis Sudermannus (1611–1679) was a Swedish prelate, vicar in the Diocese of Västerås, writer, and poet. He was attached to the Royal Academy of Åbo (Turku).

He married Bellina, daughter of Stephanus Olai Bellinus, and granddaughter of Olaus Canuti Helsingius.

== Bibliography ==
- De prima et cardinali virtute Justitia. Ab. 1643
- De adjunctorum propriorum communicatione. Ib. 1646
- Pentas I. Quæstionum nobiliorum Philosophicarum. Ib. 1648
- Pentas II. Quæstion. selectiorum Philosophicarum, e. a.
- Pentas III. Quæst. præstantiorum Philos. Ib. e. a.
- Pentas I, II, III et IV. Quæstionum selectior. philos. Aros. 1659, 1660 ("4 Gymnasiidisputationer")
- Historia universalis
