= Anders Angerstein =

German-Swedish ironmaster (1614–1659)

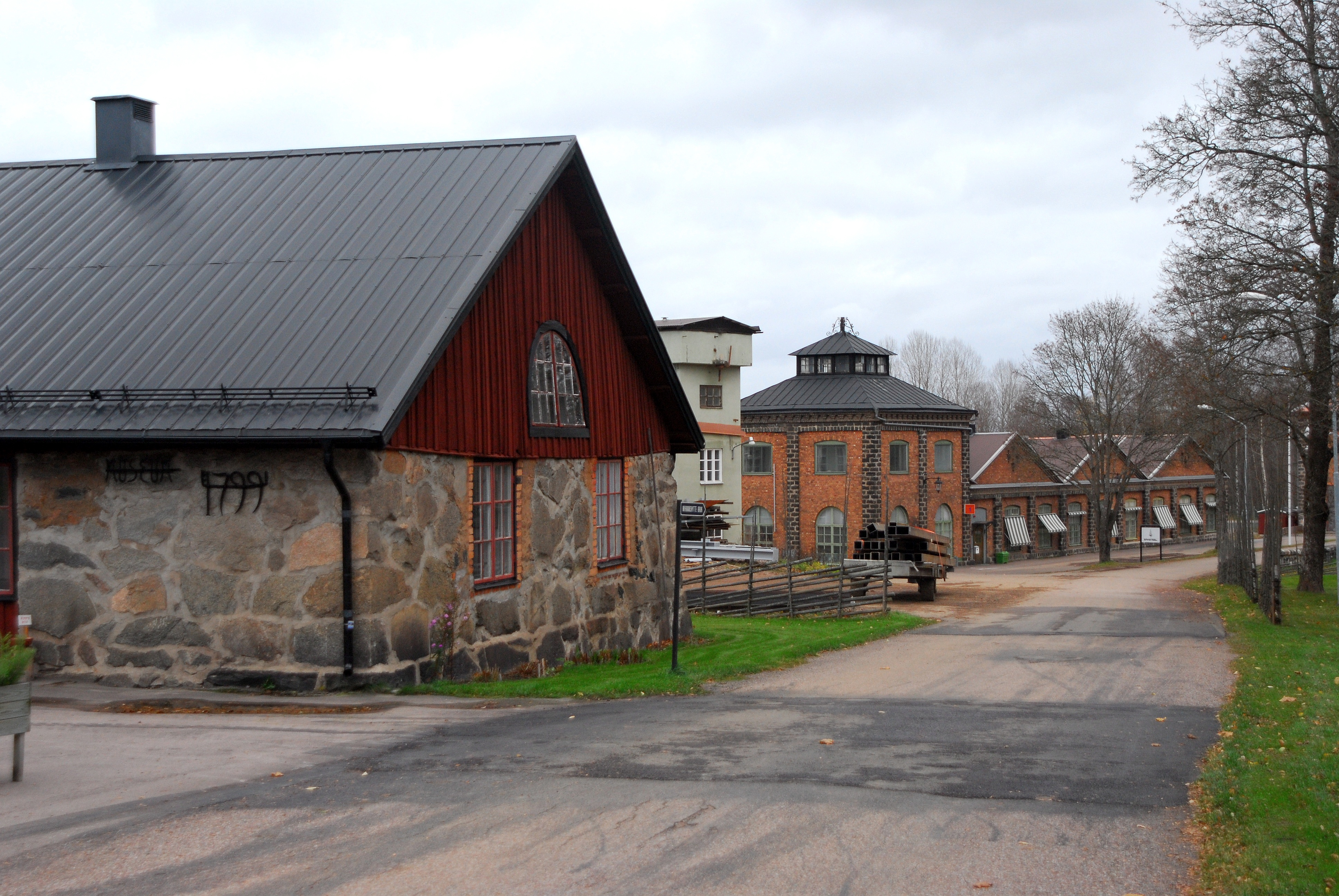
Entrance to the Steelworks of Vikmanshyttan, Dalarna, after much modern improvements, subsequently transformed into a museum of regional industrial history, established in 1981.

Anders Angerstein (1614–1659), also called Andrae Angerstein, was a German-Swedish ironmaster.

== Biography ==
Anders Angerstein is said to have been born in de:Angerstein (Nörten-Hardenberg), Niedersachsen, Holy Roman Empire, with evidence indicating ultimate family origins in Hungary. He immigrated to Sweden along with accompanying miners, first in service of other equally immigrated ironmasters but with time settling by the Angerstein forge in Vikmanshyttan, Dalarna. Anders Angerstein was married to Anna Katarina Domb. Among his issue was Johan Angerstein.

With craft production authorisation by the Swedish Board of Mines the holdings were extended, subsequently including Vira bruk, Thurbo, and Bispberg, inter alia, remaining in the family until the 19th century. Anders Angerstein is noted for improvements for charcoal piles during his tenure.

In 1981, the former Angerstein steelworks of which he laid the foundation were transformed into the Steelworks Museum of Vikmanshyttan, maintained as a museum of regional industrial history.
