= Helsingius =

Helsingius is a surname. Notable people with the surname include:

- Barbara Helsingius (1937–2017), Finnish fencer, singer, and poet
- Johan Helsingius (born 1961), Finnish computer scientist
- Olaus Canuti Helsingius (1520–1607), Swedish prelate
