= Reinhold Angerstein =

Swedish metallurgist (1718–1760)

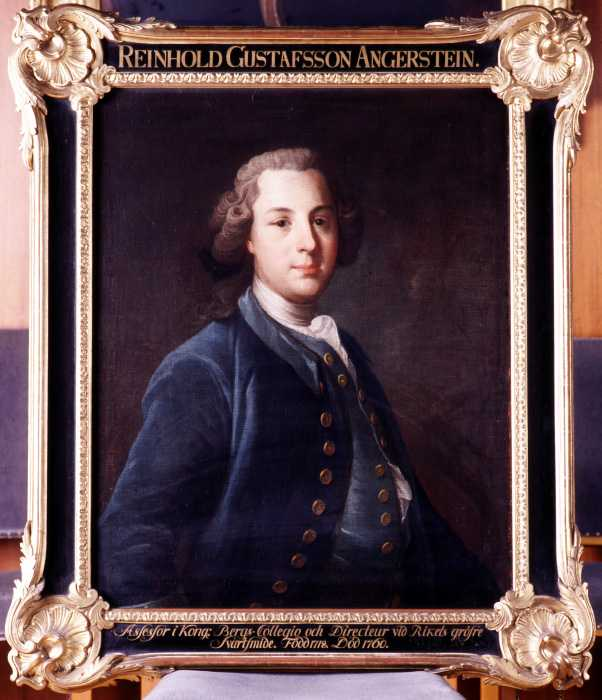
Portrait 1755 by Olof Arenius

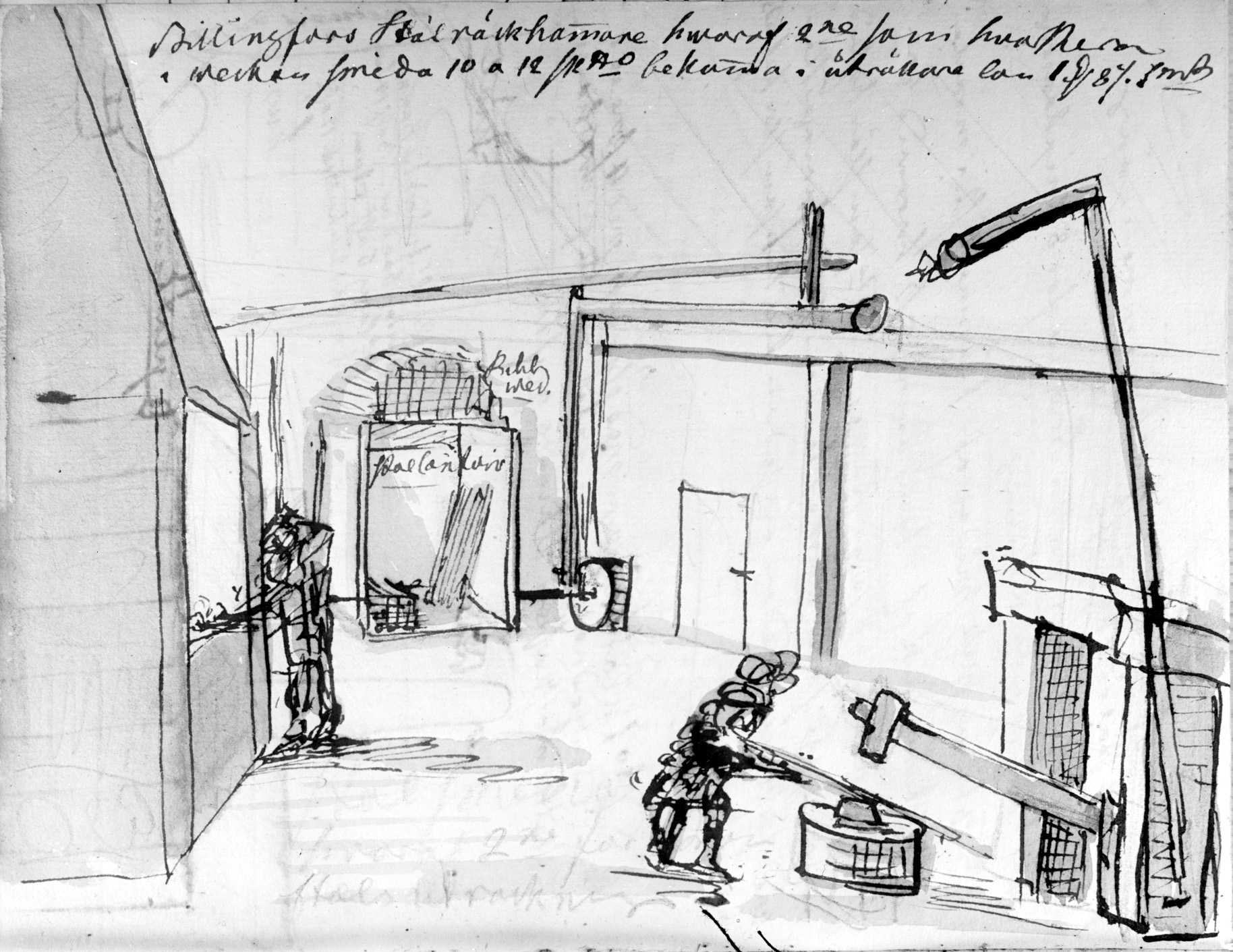
Billingsfors Iron Works

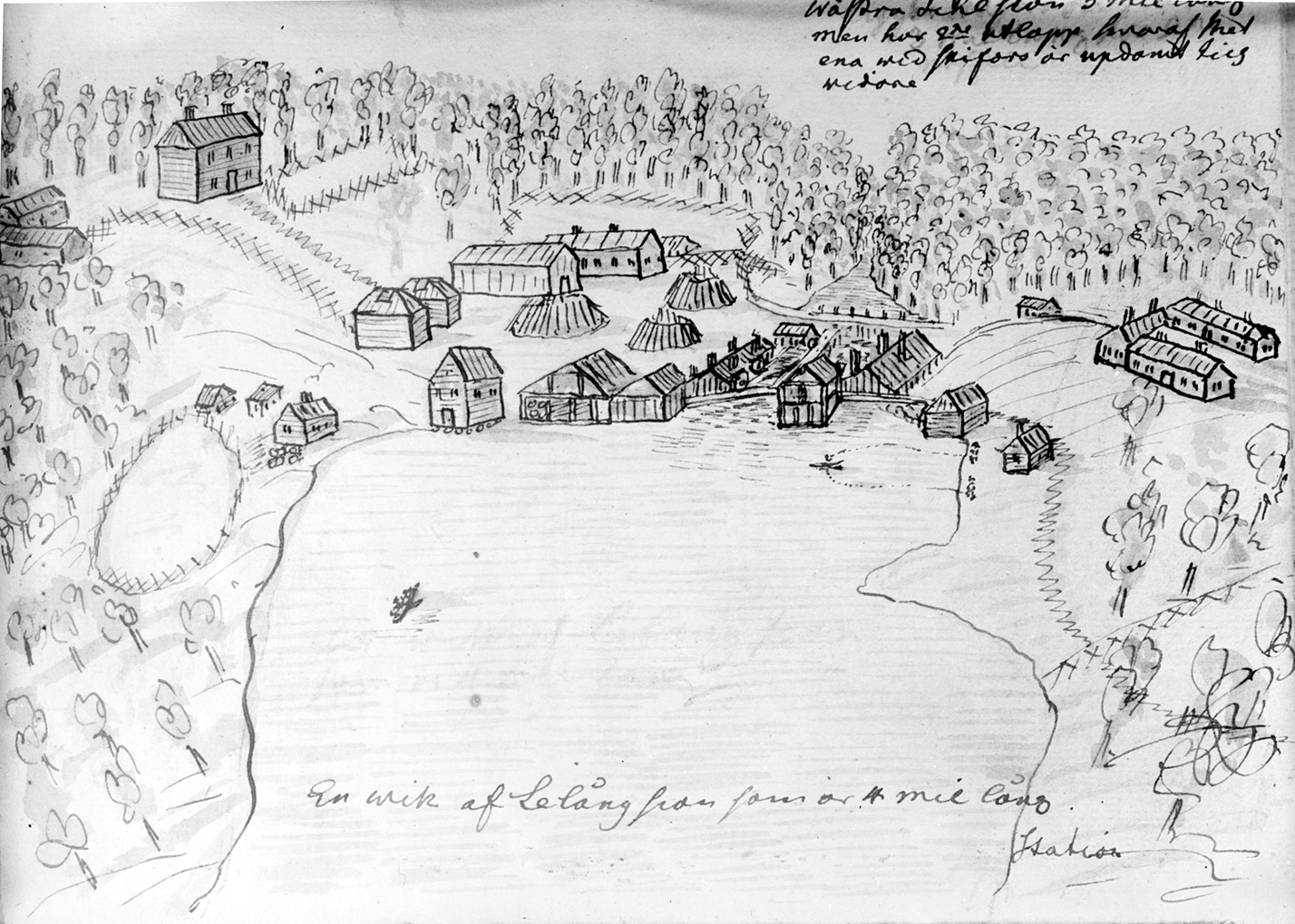
Gustafsfors Iron Works

Reinhold Rücker Angerstein (October 25, 1718, at Vikmanshyttan – January 5, 1760, in Stockholm) was a Swedish metallurgist, civil servant and entrepreneur.

Angerstein was a member of an old family of Swedish Iron Masters, of German descent. He passed his matriculation in Uppsala 1727 and then worked as an auditor at the Swedish Board of Mines (Bergskollegium) between 18 and 24 years of age.

At the age of 31 he started a series of long journeys abroad, financed by the Swedish Association of Iron Masters (Jernkontoret). From these trips he wrote extensive and illustrated travel accounts back to Sweden. He primarily described technical and economic observations from mining and from Iron and Steel Works. Between 1749 and 1757 he was constantly travelling, with only few short spells in Sweden: in Germany, Austria, Italy, France, Portugal, Belgium, the Netherlands and Britain.

After returning to Sweden he got a position at Bergskollegium as Director of Steelworks (Direktör för rikets gröfre svartsmide). There exist illustrations also from his inspection tours of Swedish Iron Works. Towards the end of his life he purchased the Vira Iron Works in Uppland in 1757, northeast of Stockholm, renowned for forging of weapons for the army. He had far-reaching plans to extend this plant, but had no time to implement them before his death in 1760.

Between 1753 and 1755 he visited England and Wales, where he was considered an industrial spy. His visit to Sheffield was brief, less than a day, and it has been suggested that he was driven out of the town for showing too much interest in the crucible process newly invented by Benjamin Huntsman.

In this mountain area there is a lot of Potatoes planted, as the agriculture here is rather weak, and out of 1 part potatoes and 2 parts rice meal bread is baked; the dow is prepared an ordinary fashion, and the made acid, thereafter the potatoes – earlier boiled and peeled - are mashed and mixed with the dow, after which it once more is made acid. After a while big round bread cakes are baked out of this dow, are baked in the oven and do not taste bad.

— Diary from the Travel from Freiberg through Saxony, Bohemia, Poland, Austria and Italy the Years 1750 and 1751, January 22, 1750, in Prague

Wooden fences in Steyermark and Upper Austria are tied with wickers, and put down wi[t]h one pole at a time: in order to twine around each second pole. Fences here most often consist of split wood, which is not very long; however, as the poles stand so much closer it will anyhow become difficult so get over them.

— Ditto, Oktober 29 1750 in Austria

== To read more ==
- R R Angerstein's Illustrated Travel Diary 1753-1755: industry in England and Wales from a Swedish perspective, translated by Torsten & Peter Berg, The Science Museum, London 2001, ISBN 1-900747-24-3
- Göran Rydén & A. Florén: A Journey to the Market Society. A Swedish Pre-Industrial Spy in the Middle of the Eighteenth Century, in R. Björk & K. Molin, eds.: Societies made up of history, Rolf Torstendahls festskrift, Uppsala 1999
- Reinhold R. Angerstein: Reinhold R. Angersteins resor genom Ungern och Österrike 1750, Jernkontorets bergshistoriska utskott, Stockholm 1992
- Leos Müller: Consuls, Corsairs, and Commerce. The Swedish Consular Service and Long-distance Shipping, 1720-1815, Forum Naval No 10, 2004, ISBN 91-974015-8-7
