= James Murray Barbour =

Murray Barbour's method of Strähle construction

James Murray Barbour (1897–1970) is an American acoustician, musicologist, and composer best known for his work Tuning and Temperament: A Historical Survey (1951, 2d ed. 1953). As the opening of the work describes, it is based upon his unpublished dissertation from 1932, his interest having been sparked by musicologist Curt Sachs having shown him Marin Mersenne's Harmonie Universelle. Murray Barbour taught at Ithaca College, New York, 1932–1939, and Michigan State College (later University), 1939–1964. Murray Barbour adapted the Strähle construction for use in approximating equal temperaments.

He is also the author of

- "Synthetic Musical Scales", The American Mathematical Monthly, Vol. 36, No. 3, (Mar., 1929), pp. 155–160.
- Trumpets, Horns and Music (1964). Michigan State University.
- "A Geometrical approximation to the Roots of Numbers", American Mathematical Monthly, vol. 64, 1957. p. 1–9.

== See also ==
- Equal temperament
- Musical temperament
- Musical tuning
