= Nils Hülphers =

18th c. Swedish politician

Nils Hülphers, sometimes transcribed Hylphert (1712–1776), was a Swedish mayor of Hedemora (1760), and member of the Riksdag of Sweden (1755—1756, 1765—1770).

Nils Hülphers was the grandson of Nils Rabenius and cousin of Abraham Hülphers the Elder. Hülphers married Katarina Westman in 1745.
