= Stora Tuna Church =

Church in Borlänge, Sweden

- Stora Tuna kyrka
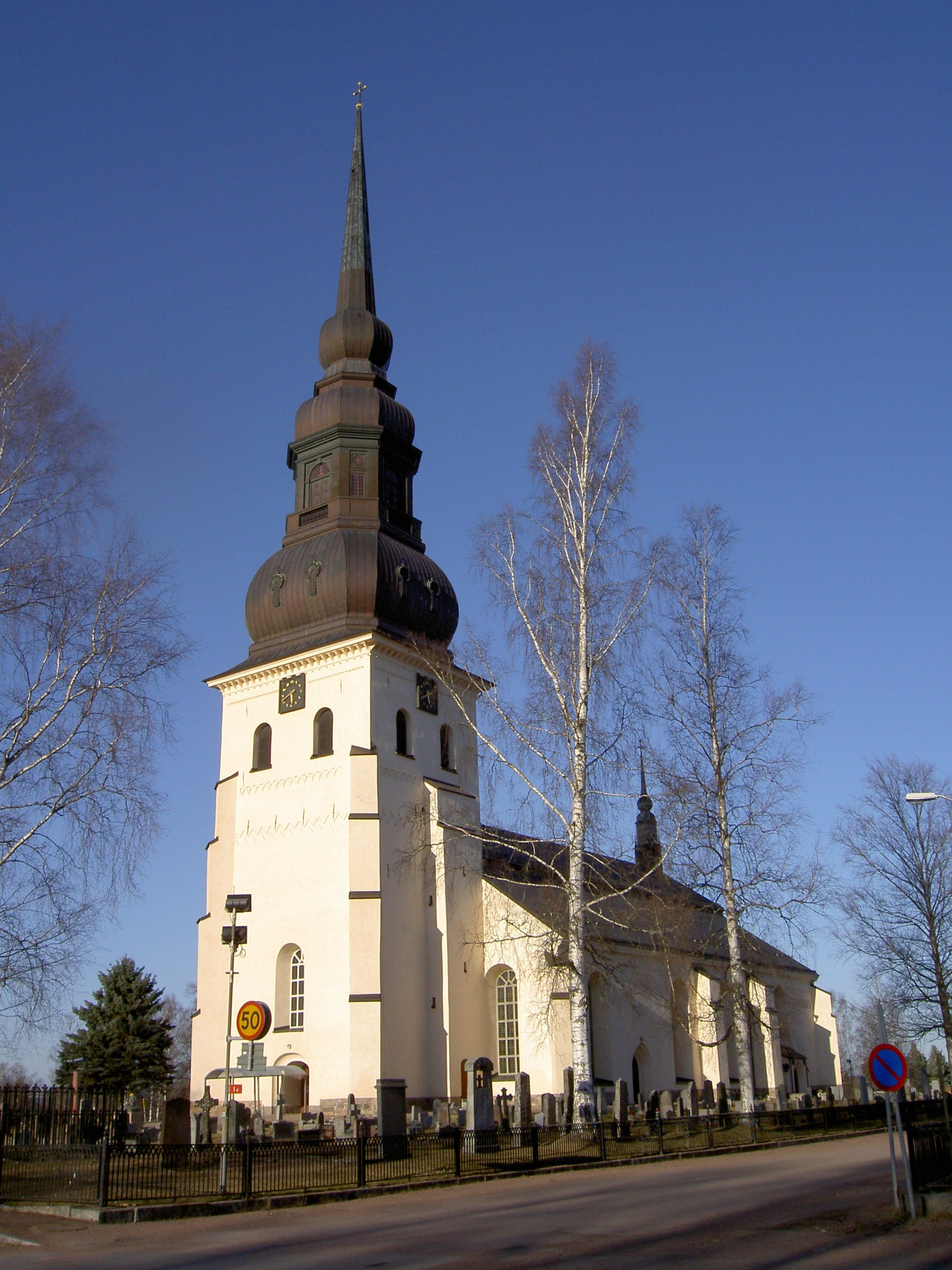
- Church exterior in 2008
- Stora Tuna Church
- 60.451944°N 15.475556°E
- Country: Sweden
- Denomination: Church of Sweden

History
- Consecrated: 1469

Architecture
- Functional status: Active

Administration
- Diocese: Västerås

Stora Tuna Church (Swedish: Stora Tuna kyrka) is a church of the Diocese of Västerås located in Borlänge in Dalarna County, Sweden. It is protected as an ecclesiastical cultural heritage site.

== History ==
The church was consecrated in 1469, having been built on the site of an old stone church from the 13th century. It was originally intended, as Dalecarlia Cathedral, to be a cathedral in the Diocese of Västerås.

The church was seriously damaged by a fire in 1807.

In January 1914, it was reported in Dagens Nyheter that a proposal had been prepared by architect Axel Lindegren for the church's restoration. The plans included a copper-clad spire, as well as the addition of electricity for heating, lighting, and bell ringing. The construction took nearly four years and cost more than 278,000 SEK. The restored church was inaugurated on 2 December 1917, with the then-Crown Prince Gustaf VI Adolf and Crown Princess Margaret in attendance. He then revisited it as king in November 1968.

While excavations were underway in 1921 for a planned parish schoolhouse (300 m southwest of the church), skeletal remains were found. Ethnologist Ola Bannbers was sent to conduct an excavation. At the time it was hypothesized that the remains could be followers of Nils Stensson Sture executed in 1528. Radiocarbon dating from a 2018 study later cast doubt on this theory, as it showed the skeletons were from c. 1040–1260, or the late Middle Ages.

In 2016, a religiously-neutral burial site was designated in the Stora Tuna burial grounds. Ann-Louise Eberstein wrote a book in 2019 about the church's history on the occasion of its 550th year. The church received a new choir mat in October 2021, designed by textile artist Frida Lindberg alongside weavers Ebba Bergström and Samantha Gustafsson. Stora Tuna Church closed temporarily to visitors in February 2022 after a series of thefts and attempted thefts.

== Architecture ==
It was initially believed to be the largest rural church in Sweden, but a reassessment in 1961 determined Järvsö Church to be larger (although Stora Tuna's spire is higher). The floor area of Stora Tuna Church is 997 m^{2} (10,730 sq ft) and the height of the spire is 84.2 m (276 ft).

== Interior ==
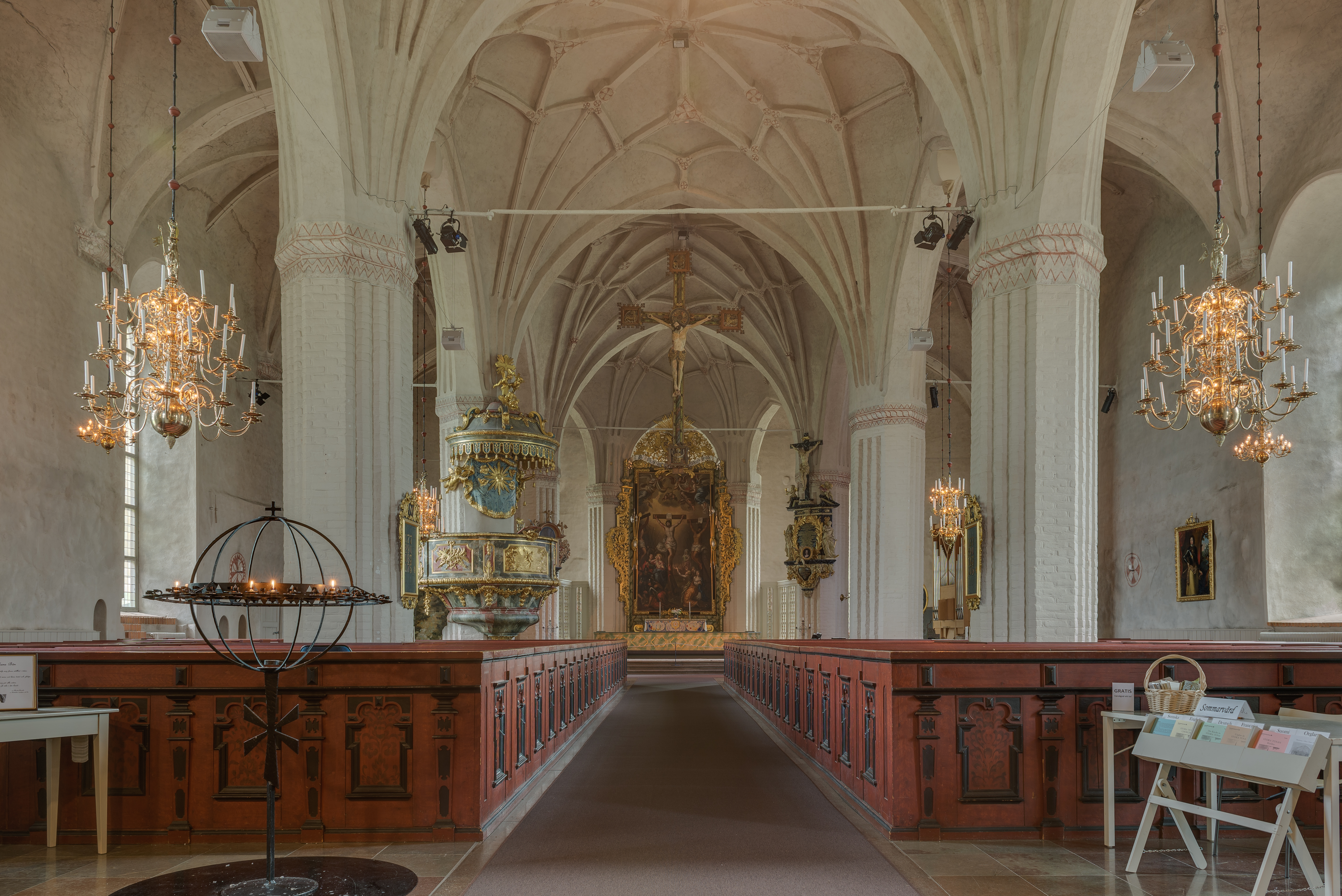
Church interior in 2013

Stora Tuna's triumphal cross measures 6 m (20 ft) high, and is believed to have been created in the early 16th century by an anonymous woodcarver, known as the Stora Tuna-mästaren. The baptismal font, made of limestone from Uppland, also dates back to the 16th century. The pulpit was made by ornamental sculptor Johan Ljung in 1757. The church's main organ, built in 1968 by A. Magnusson Orgelbyggeri AB, has 43 stops.

== Burials ==
Notable burials in the cemetery surrounding the church include:

- Jussi Björling
- Isa Quensel
- Birgit Ridderstedt
