= Järvsö Church =

Church in Järvsö, Sweden

- Järvsö kyrka
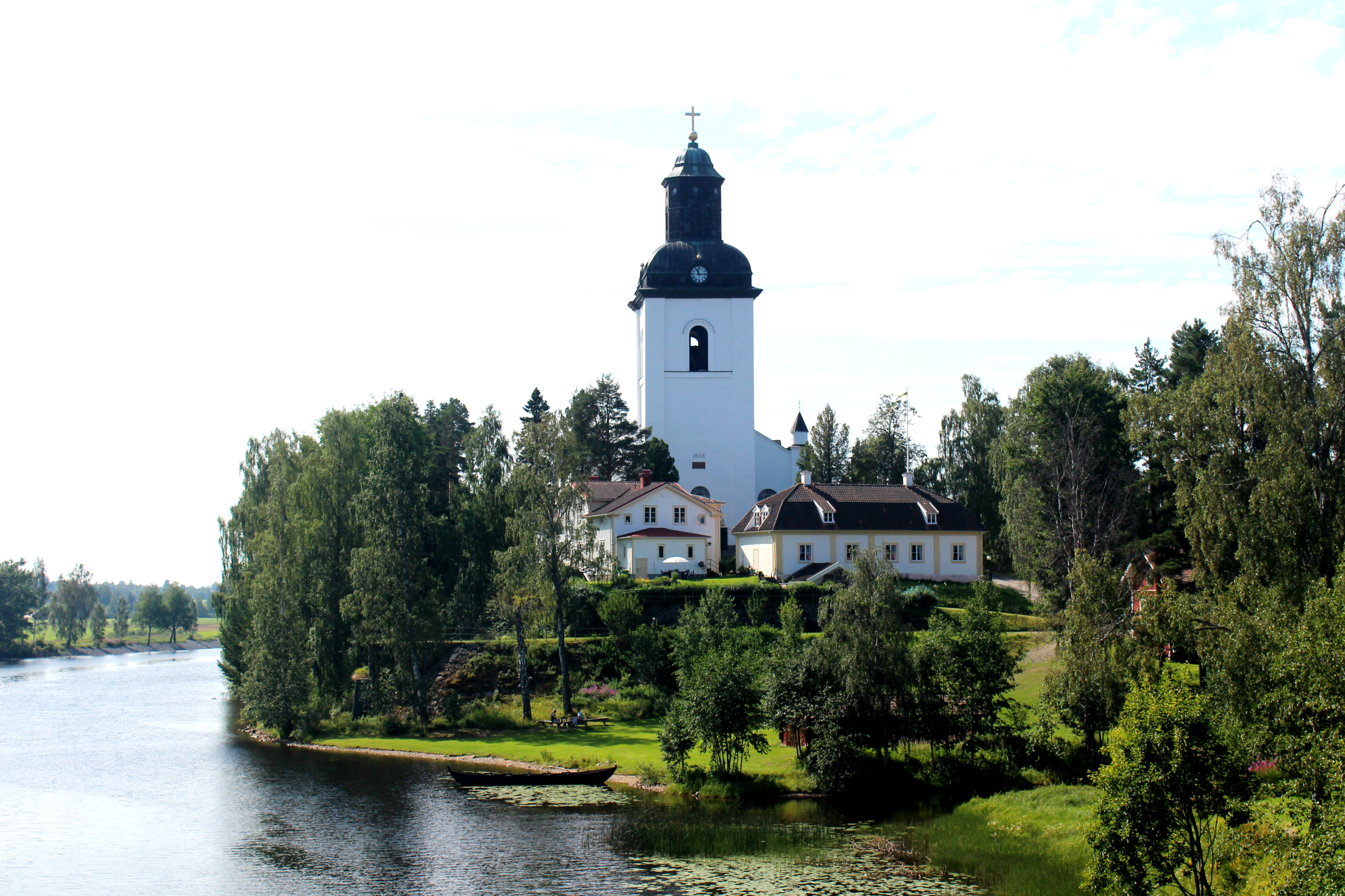
- Church exterior in 2014
- Järvsö Church
- 61.709442°N 16.181331°E
- Country: Sweden
- Denomination: Church of Sweden

History
- Consecrated: 21 July 1838

Architecture
- Functional status: Active
- Architect: Carl Gustaf Blom Carlsson
- Style: Neoclassical

Administration
- Archdiocese: Uppsala

Järvsö Church (Swedish: Järvsö kyrka) is a church of the Archdiocese of Uppsala located on the island of Kyrkön in Järvsö, Gävleborg County, Sweden.

== Location ==
The church is located on Kyrkön, a 5.97-hectare (14.8-acre) island surrounded on all sides by water: the Ljusnan to the east and the Lillälven (a slower-moving tributary) to the west.

== History ==
The church was designed by architect Carl Gustaf Blom Carlsson and consecrated on 21 July 1838 by Archbishop Johan Olof Wallin. Wallin composed a psalm for the occasion, the so-called Järvsö psalm, which appeared in the Church of Sweden's 1986 hymnal book. During restoration work in 1958, graves were discovered under the floor of the church. Antiquarian Olle Källström determined the graves likely dated back to the 17th century, from a previous church which existed on the same site as the present Järvsö Church. The church was reopened after these renovations on 21 December 1958 by Hjalmar Lindroth. The church was visited in August 1987 by King Carl XVI Gustaf and Queen Silvia of Sweden as part of a royal tour. In November 2012, the offering chest, which was used to collect money for candles, was stolen. However, it had just been emptied before the weekend so no money was lost.

== Architecture and interior ==
The church was built with a neoclassical style and has a plaster facade. It is protected as a ecclesiastical cultural heritage site. It was initially believed to be the second-largest rural church in Sweden, but a reassessment in 1961 determined Järvsö Church to be larger than Stora Tuna Church. The floor area is 1,253 m^{2} (13,490 sq ft) and the height of the spire is 53.6 m (176 ft). The church's white marble baptismal font, designed by Maj Starck, was consecrated in 1970.

== Notable burials ==
Riksdag member Emil Hultman's funeral took place at the church in 1933. Lill-Babs' funeral also took place there on 28 May 2018. She was buried in the church's cemetery.
