= Vira Bruk =

Coordinates: 59°34′16.28″N 18°32′41.64″E

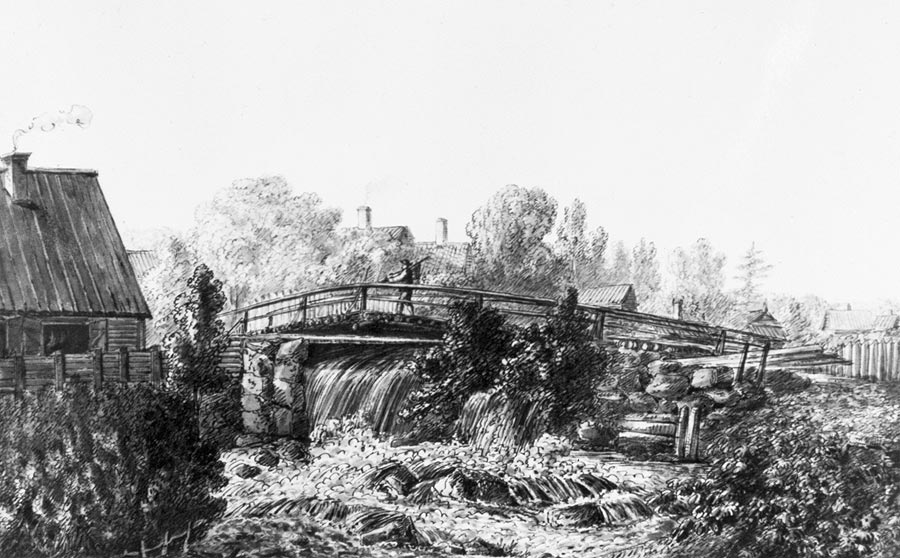
Vira bruk, 1814

Vira Bruk, also spelt Wira Bruk, is a village and an historic iron works in Österåker, Sweden. Founded around 1630 as an ironworks to manufacture weaponry for the Swedish Crown, the forge continued to manufacture civilian goods into the 20th century. Today the whole village is an open-air museum, which is also home to around 60 residents.

== History ==
Vira Bruk, also spelt Wira Bruk, is located in Österåker, around 54 km (34 mi) north of Stockholm. The village was then in the historical province of Uppland, and in the parish of Roslags-Kulle. The forge was located a stream called Viraån.

It was founded around 1630 by Clas Fleming, who was admiral of the Swedish fleet, and the first Governor of Stockholm. On the basis on a monopoly granted by a royal privilege it went into full production of most of the rapiers and swords for the Swedish army from at least 25 April 1635 onwards. The skilled armourers engaged by Fleming were kept busy manufacturing arms through the Thirty Years' War (1618–1648). Around 40 ironworkers worked there, and the iron ore came from the Dannemora mine, north of the village.

In 1668 production stopped, as there was no demand for weaponry during peacetime, and did not restart until 1674.

Vira Bruk was owned by the Fleming family until 1757, when it was sold to Reinhold Angerstein, who at that time was an official of the Swedish Board of Mines. Angerstein planned for extension of the manufacturing, but died in 1760 before they could be realized. The works then were taken over by his brother-in-law, the archbishop Samuel Troilius. When he died in 1764, the estate was sold to a widow, Eva Maria von Schantz, whose son, Major C.S. von Schantz, acted as manager.

Vira lost its royal privilege in 1775, after years of complaints about the quality of the goods produced. However, it continued to make rapiers, bayonets, and other arms which were delivered to the Crown into the 1830s. In 1893 the eight remaining smiths formed the Vira Foundry Federation and signed a contract with Julius Stöörs ironmongery in Stokcholm, which gave him the rights to marked their products, which now included axes, scythes, ice skates, cleavers, and ice axes.

The forge continued to manufacture civilian products into the mid-20th century. The water wheel continued to operate into the 1920s, and the small forge continued until 1948.

== Modern use ==
The Vira Bruk Foundation was established in 1969 to protect the site, and the last owner donated the buildings to the Foundation. Restoration was undertaken with assistance from a government fund, and Vira Bruk is now an open-air museum.

The village is also home to around 60 residents. Today there are cottages for hire, conference and shooting facilities, a restaurant, and a craft shop.
