= Jacob Faggot =

Swedish scientist (1699–1777)

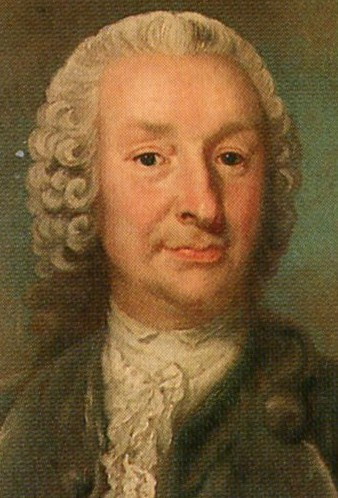
- Faggot in the 1750s
- Born: 13 March 1699; Uppsala County, Sweden
- Died: 28 February 1777 (aged 77); Stockholm, Sweden
- Education: Uppsala University
- Occupations: Scientist, surveyor, government official

Jacob Faggot (13 March 1699 – 28 February 1777) was a Swedish scientist, civil servant, and surveyor.

== Life and career ==
Faggot was educated at Uppsala University and later worked as a tutor of Swedish political leader Nils Reuterholm.

From 1727 onwards, he worked in the Lantmäterikontoret (surveying office) as a surveyor and geometry teacher. He became its director in 1747. On his initiative Sweden printed their first cadastral maps. His interest in reforming Swedish agriculture led him to implement the Storskiftet (great repartition), a land reform to improve agricultural output, similar to the British model, begun in 1749. He was involved in the mapping of Finland and led storskiftesverket in both Finland and Scania.

From 1733 to 1739, Faggot served on the Tabellkommissionen (Commission for the adjustment of weights and measures). He later served as a member of the commission to oversee and improve forestry schemes.

He became a founding member of the Royal Swedish Academy of Sciences in 1739, serving as its secretary from 1741 to 1744 and again from 1757 to 1760. He criticized the organization for using Latin instead of Swedish, which led to his founding the breakaway group Tungomålsgillet (Language Guild). Due to opposition from the Academy of Sciences, he was unable to get a royal charter for the organization.

Faggot assisted in creating the first Census in Sweden in 1749, after becoming the director of the Survey Office. In later life, he published on agricultural topics. His work researching genealogies via hemmansklyvning (division of inherited family lands) led to increased interest in population studies and local history.

In 1730, Faggot married Elisabeth Ehrenström; the couple had five children.

The Royal Swedish Academy of Sciences posthumously awarded a medal to Faggot in 1778.

== Selected bibliography ==
- Historien om svenska landtmäteriet och geographie ("The history of the Swedish surveying office and geographers")
- Svenska landtbrukets hinder ock hjälp ("Swedish agricultural barriers and help")
