= Hedemora church =

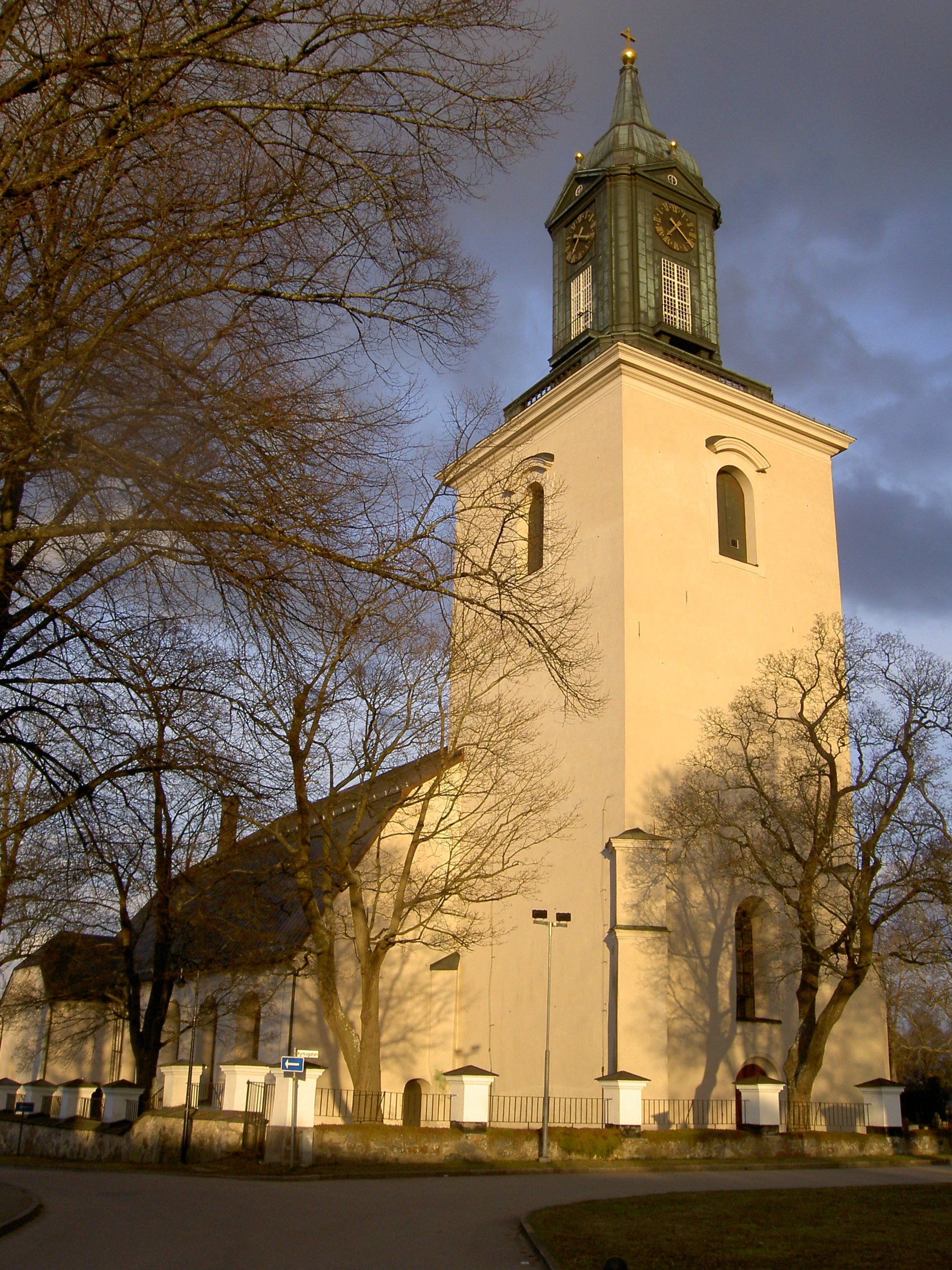
- Hedemora church in April 2008.
- Hedemora church
- 60°16′39.6″N 15°59′31″E
- Location: Hedemora
- Country: Sweden
- Denomination: Church of Sweden

Administration
- Diocese: Diocese of Västerås

Hedemora church (Swedish: Hedemora kyrka) is a church in Hedemora, Sweden. The date of the building is unknown but it was first mentioned in 1362.
