= Greta Wassberg =

Greta Matilda Hülphers, also known by her original name Greta Wassberg, (1904–1996) was a Swedish singer. She recorded about 150 disc sides 1932–1943, and did vocals for a dozen of children's tales 1957–1958 for the brand Karusell.

In 1932 she was on her first record (without mention on the label) with the song Kan du vissla Johanna? (Can you whistle Johanna?) By Sten Axelson, recorded together with John Wilhelm Hagberg on Parlophone. In the same year the recording Jag kommer i kväll under balcony appeared(I'm in the evening under the balcony) from the film comedy Söderkåkar, in which she lent her voice to the actress Astrid Carlsson.

== Discography ==
- Only go to Ander'n (1942), Arne Hülphers with orchestra and Greta Wassberg (vocals); Recording: DGG-Polydor
- Luck and glass, how easy it is, Arne Hülphers with orchestra and Greta Wassberg (vocals)
- Can love be a sin (Lothar Brühne / Bruno Balz), Great Dance Orchestra Kurt Widmann, vocals: Grete Wasberg (Greta Wassberg), recording: Tempo Nr. 666
