= Germans in Sweden =

Germans and their descendants in Sweden

Total population
- 51,434 (by birth) 29,000 (German Nationals)

Languages
- Swedish, German

Germans in Sweden, alternatively known as German Swedish people (Swedish: svensktyskar) are Swedes of full or partial German descent residing in Sweden. In 2020, there were 51,434 people living in Sweden born in Germany. Around 29,000 German citizens lived in Sweden as of 2021.

== See also ==
- Germany–Sweden relations
