= Johan Ljung =

Swedish sculptor (1717–1787)

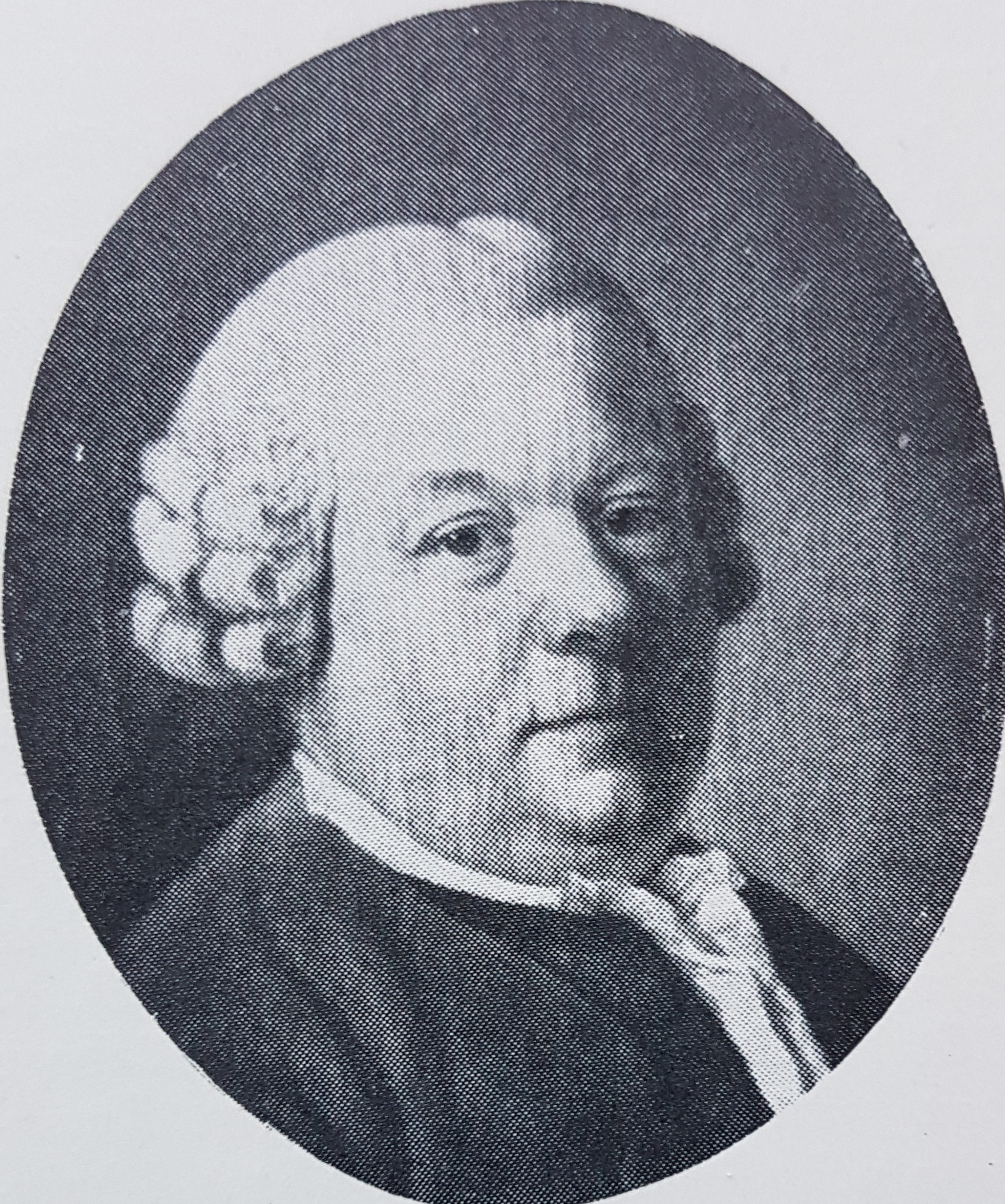
Portrait of Johan Ljung

Johan Ljung (1717–1787) was a Swedish ornamental sculptor attached to the Stockholm Palace.

He was employed at the Stockholm Palace, as was his son, Pehr Ljung (1743–1819). Ljung is represented in the collection of the National Museum, Stockholm.

He made the pulpit at Stora Tuna Church in 1757.
