= Abraham Hülphers the Younger =

Swedish writer and musicologist

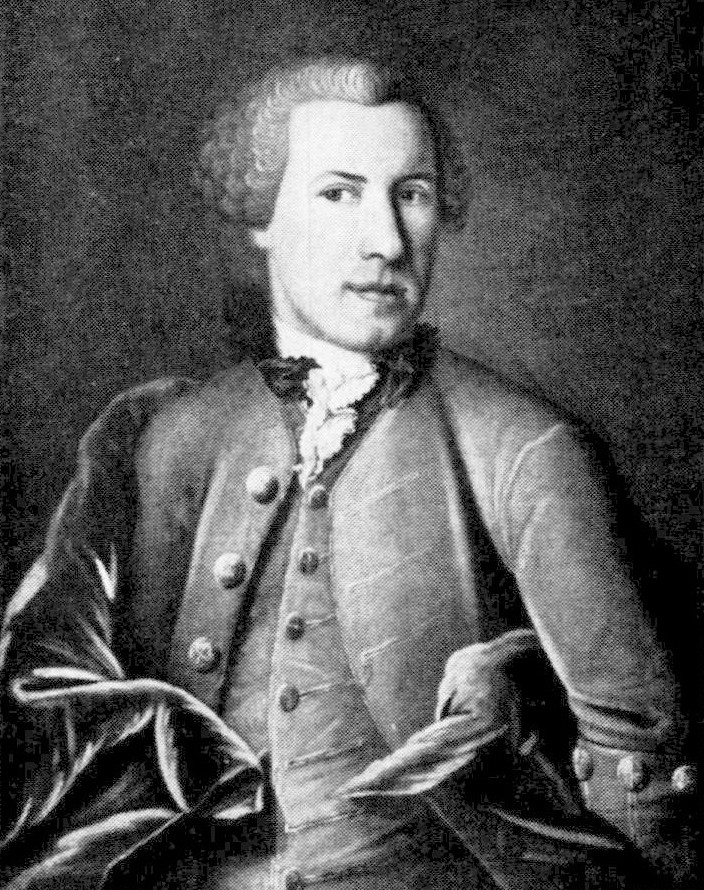
Abraham Hülphers by J. Streng

Abraham Abrahamsson Hülphers ( 27 November 1734, Västerås – 24 February 1798, Västerås) was a Swedish writer, musicologist, topographer, and genealogist. He is particularly known for his book Historisk Afhandling om Musik och Instrumenter (published in 1773) which chronicles the musical scene in Sweden during the Age of Liberty, and also provides an extensive music history of organ music in Sweden.

Abraham Hülphers was the third oldest of 13 children of the burgher Abraham Danielsson Hülphers from Hedemora, Dalarna, and his wife Christina Westdahl from Västerås. The Hülphers family immigrated to Sweden from the Holy Roman Empire in the early modern era. Through schooling in home, he was given a dynamic education and upbringing, with early interest sparked for science.

He was a member of Utile Dulci, Royal Patriotic Society, the National Board of Trade, and Pro Fide et Christianismo, among others.

== Bibliography ==
- Magdalena Hellquist (1984). Abraham Abrahamsson Hülphers och folkmålen i Westerbotten: Ett bidrag till dialektstudiets historia. DAUM Umeå. ISBN 91-86372-03-3.
