= Vikmanshyttan =

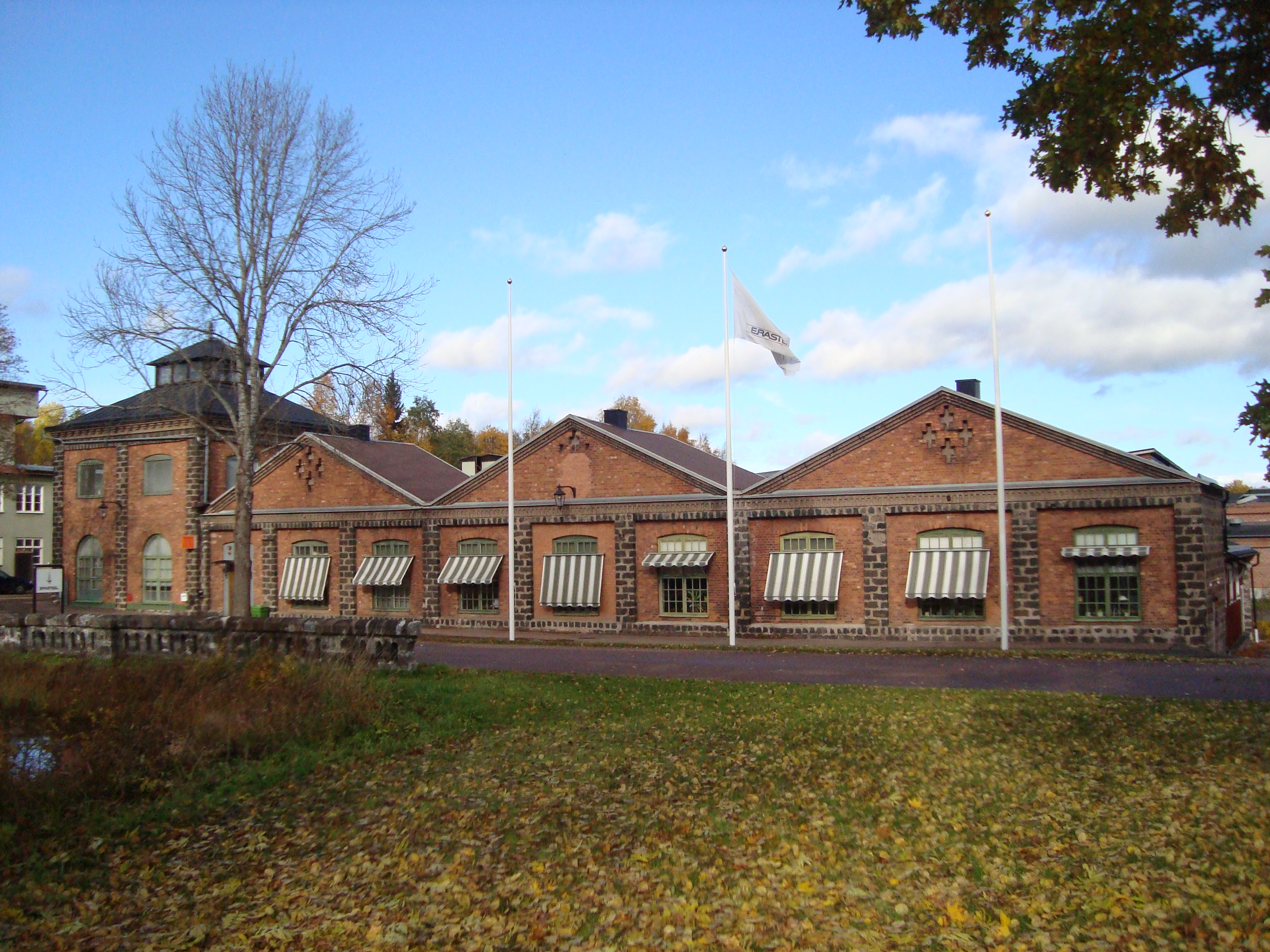

- Location within Dalarna Location within Sweden
- Coordinates: 60°17′N 15°49′E
- Country: Sweden
- Province: Dalarna
- County: Dalarna County
- Municipality: Hedemora Municipality

Area
  - Total: 1.54 km^{2} (0.59 sq mi)

Population (31 December 2010)
  - Total: 843
  - Density: 547/km^{2} (1,420/sq mi)
- Time zone: UTC+1 (CET)
  - Summer (DST): UTC+2 (CEST)

Vikmanshyttan is a locality situated in Hedemora Municipality, Dalarna County, Sweden with 843 inhabitants in 2010. On site the Steelworks Museum of Vikmanshyttan is maintained as a museum of regional industrial history.

== List of patrons ==
Incomplete

- Anders Angerstein (1614–1659)
- Johan Angerstein (1646–1716)
- Gustaf Angerstein (1686–1734)
- Johan Gustaf Angerstein (1715–1758)
- Johan Fredrik Angerstein (1753–1801)

== Gallery ==
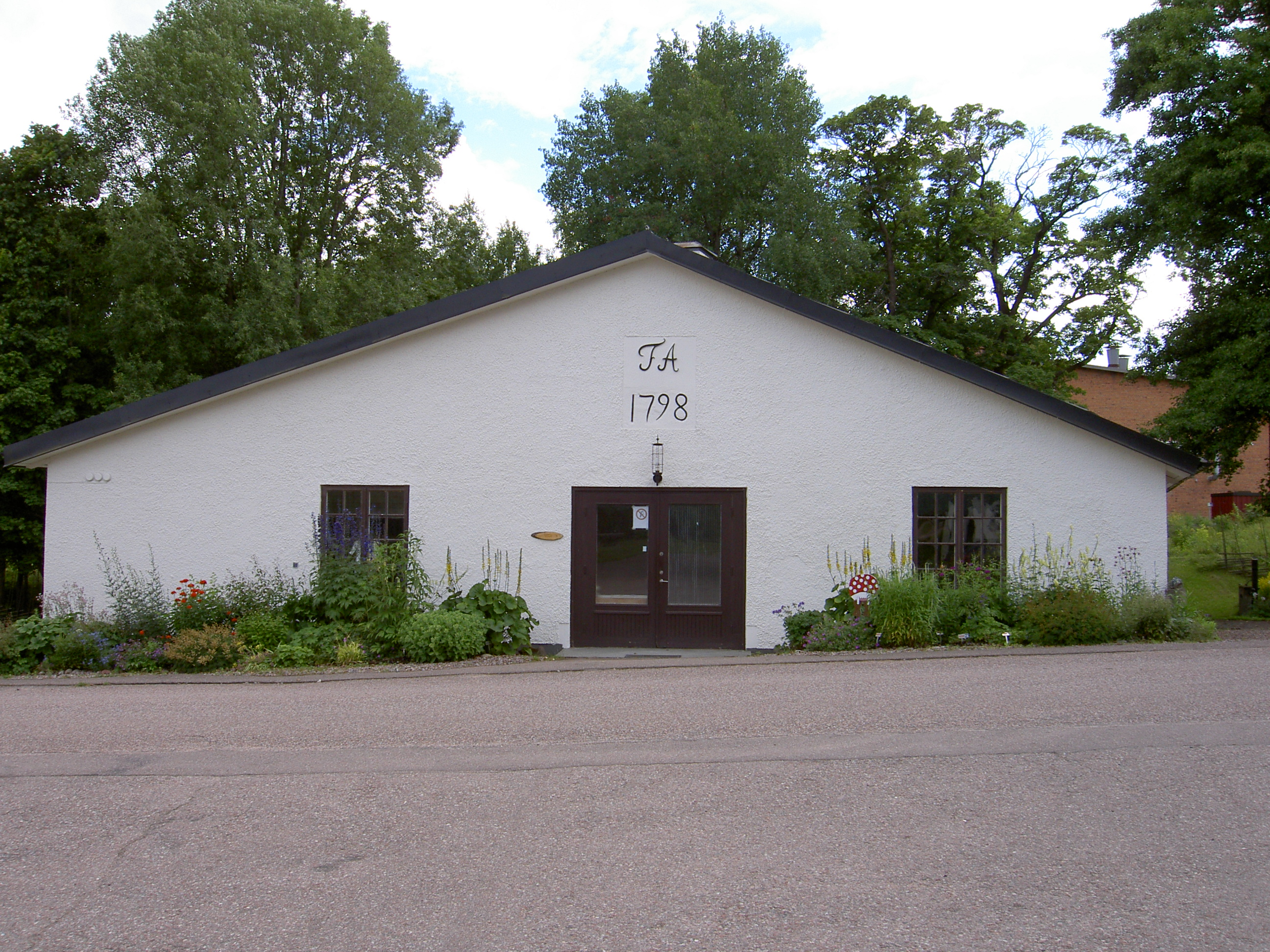
Iron work museum of Vikmanshyttan, Hedemora municipality, Sweden

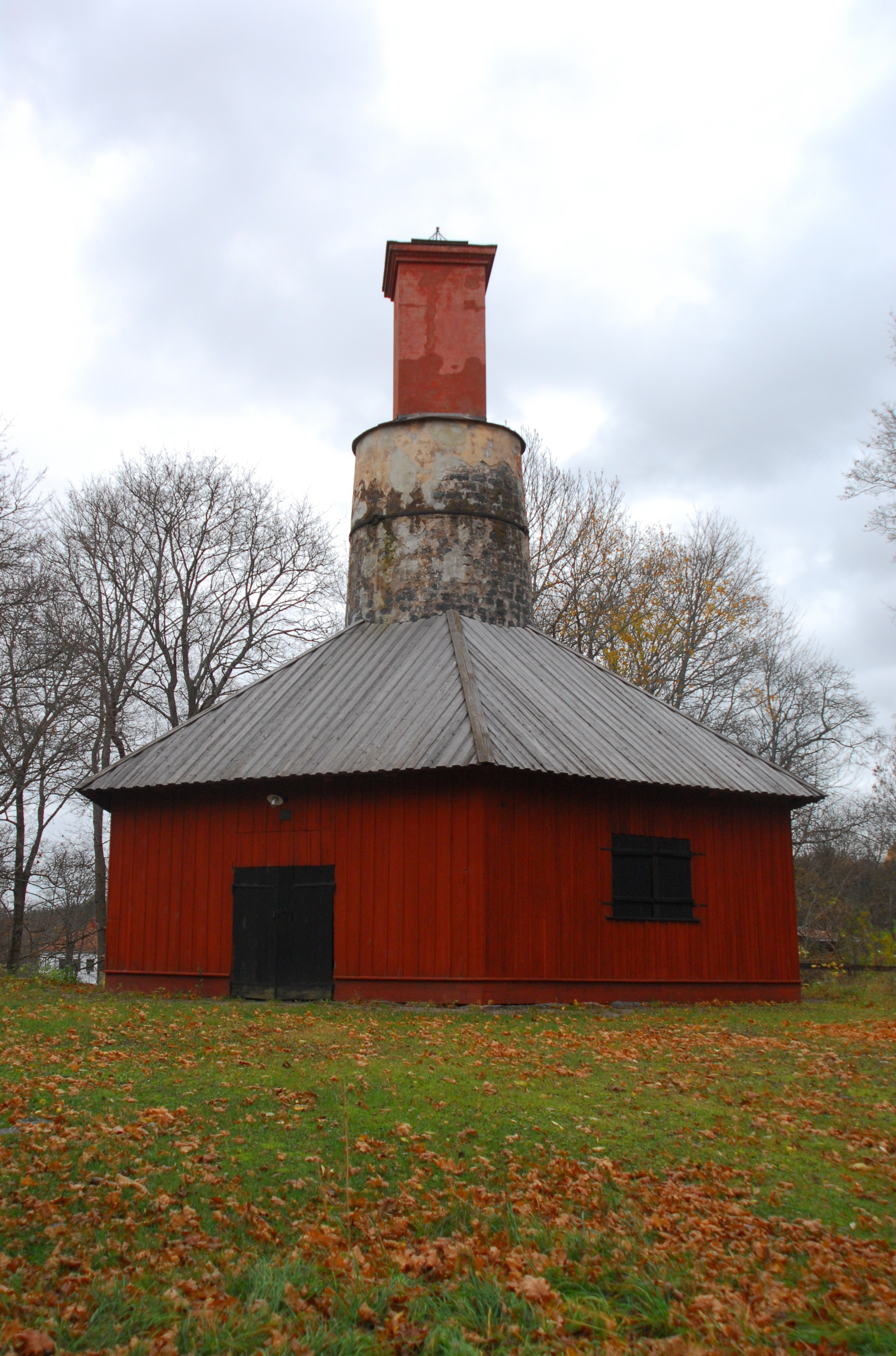
Wikmanshyttan steelworks. Old roasting furnace that once was a part of a blast furnace-complex (defunct since ca 1904).

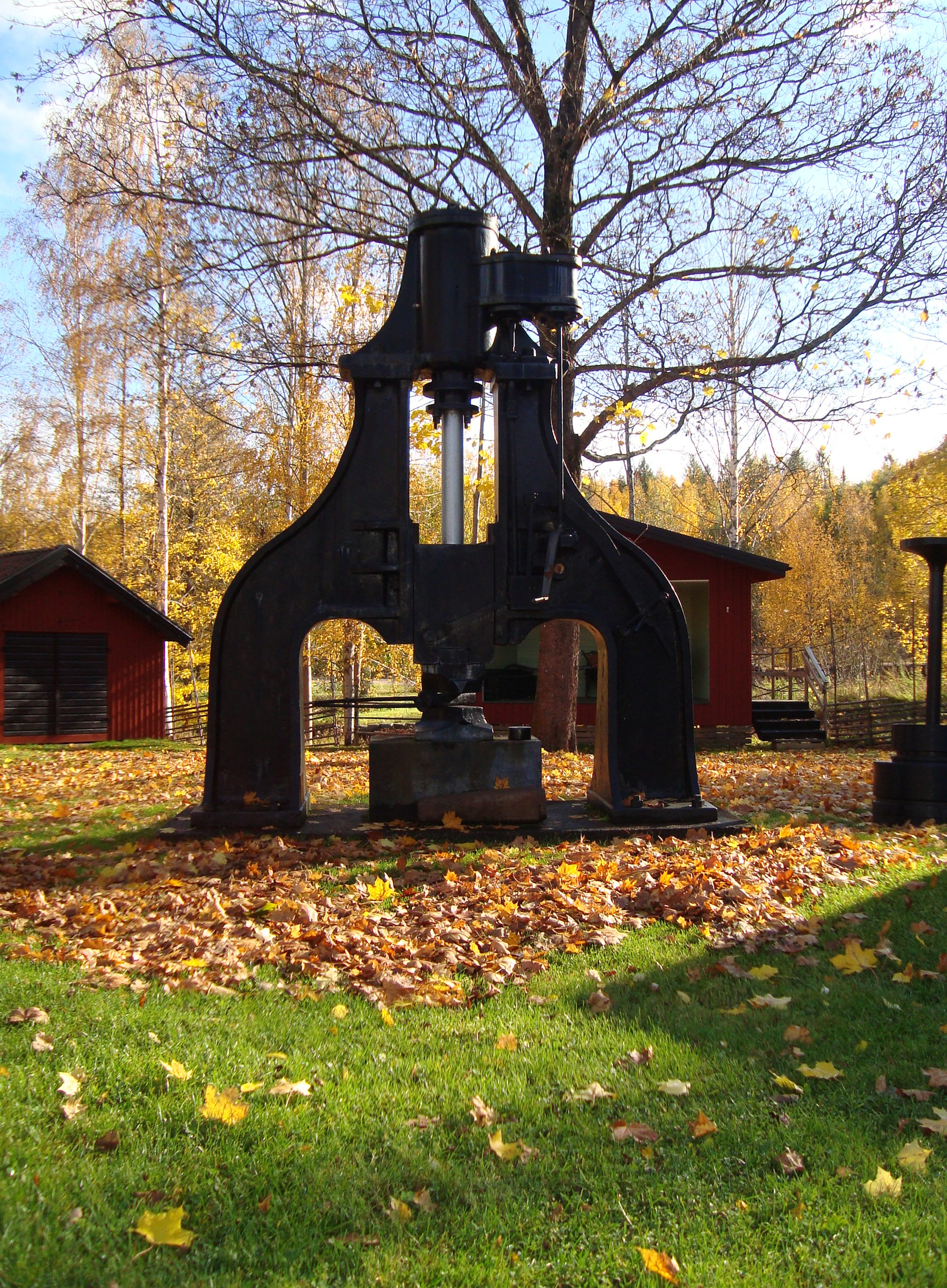
Iron work museum of Vikmanshyttan

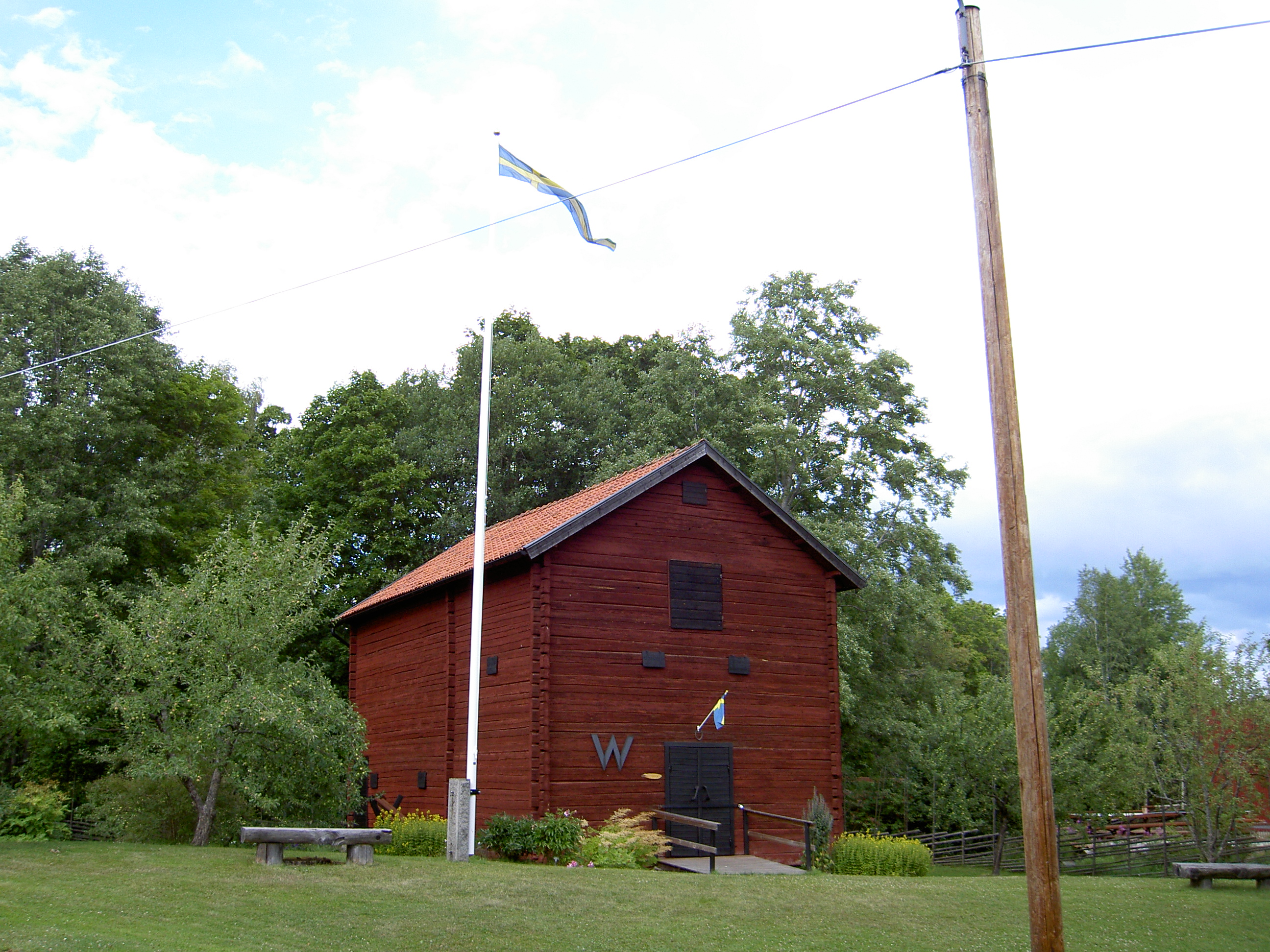
Iron work museum of Vikmanshyttan
