= Stephanus Olai Bellinus =

Swedish prelate, and writer (1570–1629)

Stephanus Olai Bellinus (1570–1629), also called Gaulander and Suecus, was a Swedish prelate, and writer, including on Latin poetry. He was a son of Olaus Stephani Bellinus, and nephew to Christopherus Stephani Bellinus, and Johannes Stephani Bellinus. Stephanus Olai Bellinus assisted at the consistorium majus of bishop Johannes Rudbeckius, and was a preacher at the Riksdag of the Estates in 1604, and at the synod of the Church of Sweden in 1620. After studies at the University of Wittenberg, Bellinus completed his Doctorate in 1593. Bellinus was the last dean of the Diocese of Västerås.

== Bibliography ==
- Artium principiis ortu et legibus (Dortmund 1593)
