= Olaus Canuti Helsingius =

Olaus Canuti Helsingius (1520-1607) was a Swedish prelate, and member of the clergy of the Riksdag of the Estates (1571, 1590, and 1594). He was a preacher at the Royal Court of Sweden, and tutor to the prince, the future King Eric XIV of Sweden. He admitted the liturgy of King John III of Sweden at the liturgical struggle, but was one of the signers of the Uppsala Synod (1593) of the Church of Sweden.
