= Swedish Board of Mines =

Former Swedish governmental agency

The Swedish Board of Mines (Swedish: Bergskollegium) was a Swedish government agency existing between 1637 and 1857 with the task of overseeing the mining industry and metal processing in Sweden. The Board was an expression of the bergregal principle, the royal ownership of mineral resources, and oversaw activities in the Swedish mountain districts. The Board issued charters for blast furnaces, trip hammers and various forms of manufacturing.

== History ==
In 1630 king Gustav II Adolf authorised the formation of a mining office (bergsamt) under the Chamber College (Kammarkollegiet). Mining activities in Sweden had expanded from the 16th century and at this time, the national mining and ironworks industry were of strategic importance during the ongoing Thirty Years' War.

In 1637 it became an independent agency under the name General Mining Office (Generalbergsamtet, also called Bergsämbetet), and was led by a governor, with the other members referred to as assessors. In 1649 it was renamed the Board of Mines (Bergskollegium) and in 1651 the title of its head was changed to president. In 1713 the other members were given the title mining councilors, bergsråd.

The regulations of 1637 stipulated that the Board of Mining should organise the mining districts (each under a bergmästare) as well as appoint all office holders within the mining sector. After a time, only lower level appointments were handled by the Board of Mines, with the higher level appointments handled by the crown. In legal cases related to mining, the Board of Mines functioned as a court of appeal, similar to that of the Hovrätt. The court role of the Board of Mines ended in 1828, when the mining-related cases were transferred to the ordinary courts. In 1857, the Board of Mines was dissolved and its remaining tasks were transferred to the National Board of Trade (Kommerskollegium).

== See also ==
- Bergslagen ("mountain district"), the area where most mining activities were concentrated
- Vuorineuvos – title of mining councilor (bergsråd), still in use in Finland as an honorary title for achievements in industry and commerce.
