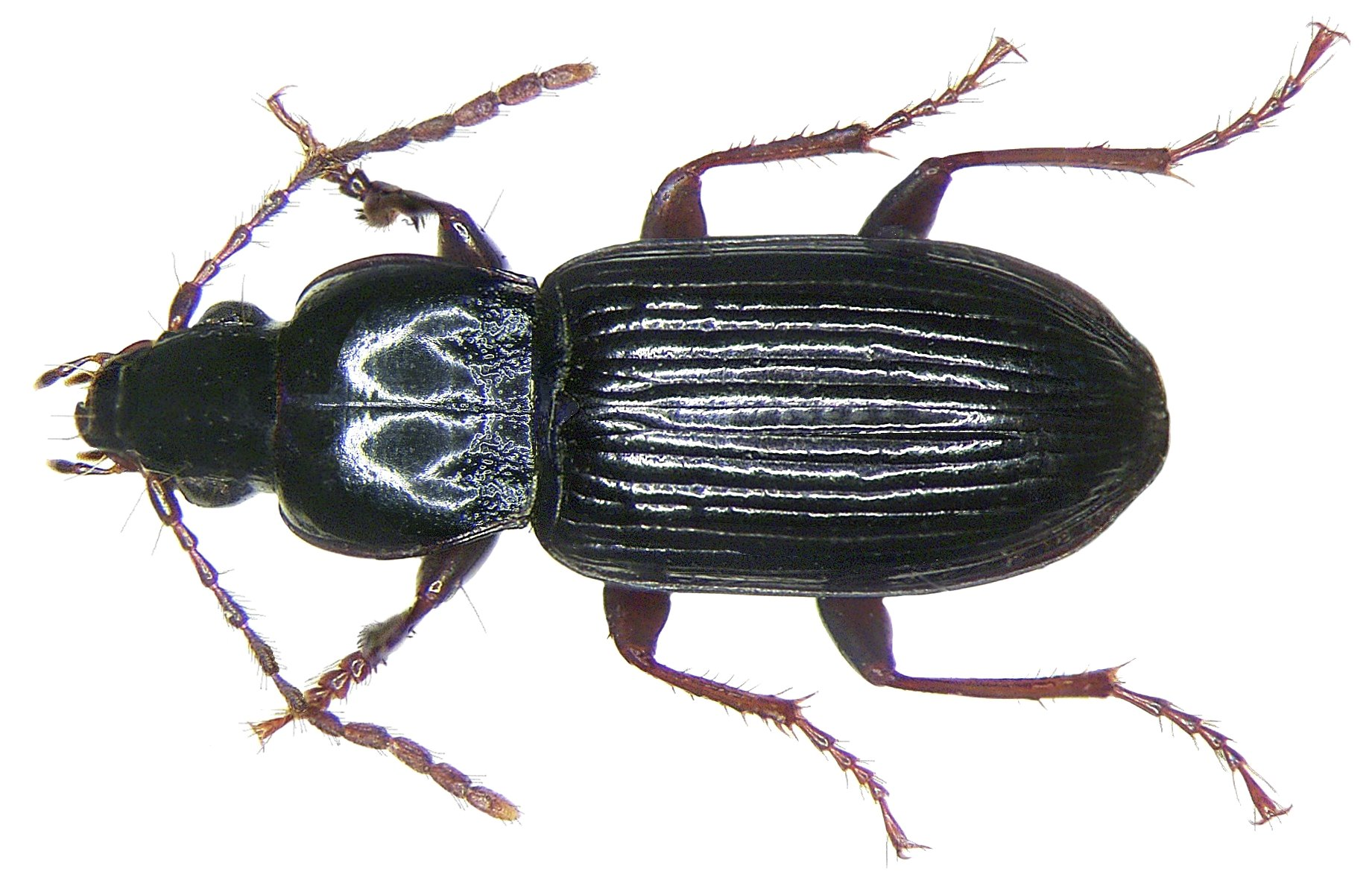

Scientific classification
- Kingdom: Animalia
- Phylum: Arthropoda
- Class: Insecta
- Order: Coleoptera
- Suborder: Adephaga
- Family: Carabidae
- Subfamily: Pterostichinae
- Tribe: Pterostichini
- Genus: Pterostichus
- Species: P. minor

Binomial name
- Pterostichus minor ( Gyllenhal, 1827)

= Pterostichus minor =

Species of beetle

Pterostichus minor is a species of woodland ground beetle native to Europe.
