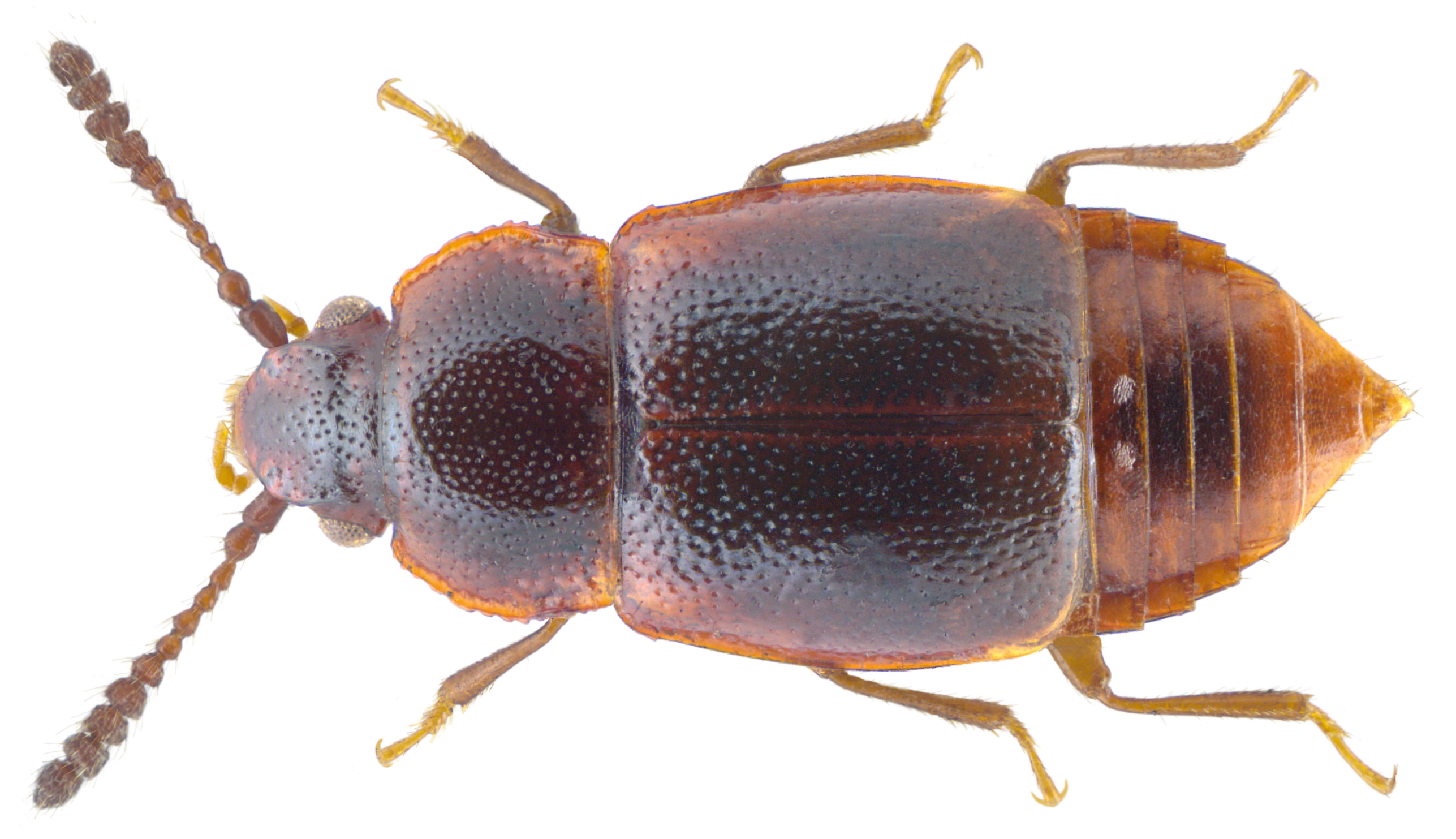

Scientific classification
- Kingdom: Animalia
- Phylum: Arthropoda
- Class: Insecta
- Order: Coleoptera
- Suborder: Polyphaga
- Infraorder: Staphyliniformia
- Family: Staphylinidae
- Genus: Acrulia
- Species: A. inflata

Binomial name
- Acrulia inflata (Gyllenhal, 1813)

= Acrulia inflata =

Species of beetle

Acrulia inflata is a species of beetle belonging to the family Staphylinidae.

It is native to Europe.
