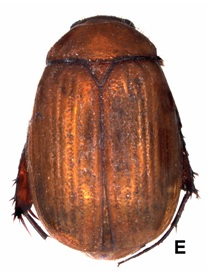

Scientific classification
- Kingdom: Animalia
- Phylum: Arthropoda
- Class: Insecta
- Order: Coleoptera
- Suborder: Polyphaga
- Infraorder: Scarabaeiformia
- Family: Scarabaeidae
- Genus: Maladera
- Species: M. setifera

Binomial name
- Maladera setifera (Gyllenhal, 1817)

Synonyms
- Melolontha setifera Gyllenhal, 1817; Serica setifera

= Maladera setifera =

Species of beetle

Maladera setifera is a species of beetle of the family Scarabaeidae. It is found in Indonesia (Java).

== Description ==
Adults reach a length of about 7.3 mm. They have a yellowish brown, oval body, with yellowish antennae. They are mostly dull, with a few robust setae on head, but otherwise glabrous.

== History ==
For long time it was believed that the species originated from India, because the type locality was originally given as India orientalis. Since the designed lectotype fits to 100% recently collected and geographically well-defined material, the type locality could be more strictly circumscribed to Java. Indeed, the most important ports on the East India route were Cape, Batavia and Canton, and thus the two latter are the completely dominant places of origin for specimens labelled India orientalis in Swedish collections, and supporting the identification of the type locality as being Java. This is further supported by geographically rather restricted distributions of species of the M. thomsoni species group, which includes M. setifera.
