= Euserica cobosi =

Scientific classification
- Kingdom: Animalia
- Phylum: Arthropoda
- Class: Insecta
- Order: Coleoptera
- Suborder: Polyphaga
- Infraorder: Scarabaeiformia
- Family: Scarabaeidae
- Genus: Euserica
- Species: E. cobosi

Binomial name
- Euserica cobosi Baraud, 1965

Species of beetle

Euserica cobosi is a species of beetle of the family Scarabaeidae. It is found in Morocco.

== Description ==
Adults reach a length of about 8 mm. They are very similar to Euserica alcaidei, but the head is very narrowed anteriorly, the anterior margin with a strong triangular incision. The pronotum is more transverse, much less narrowed anteriorly, with the sides very straight and parallel, and not narrowed posteriorly. The punctation slightly stronger and denser.

== Etymology ==
The species is named after its collector, A. Cobos.
