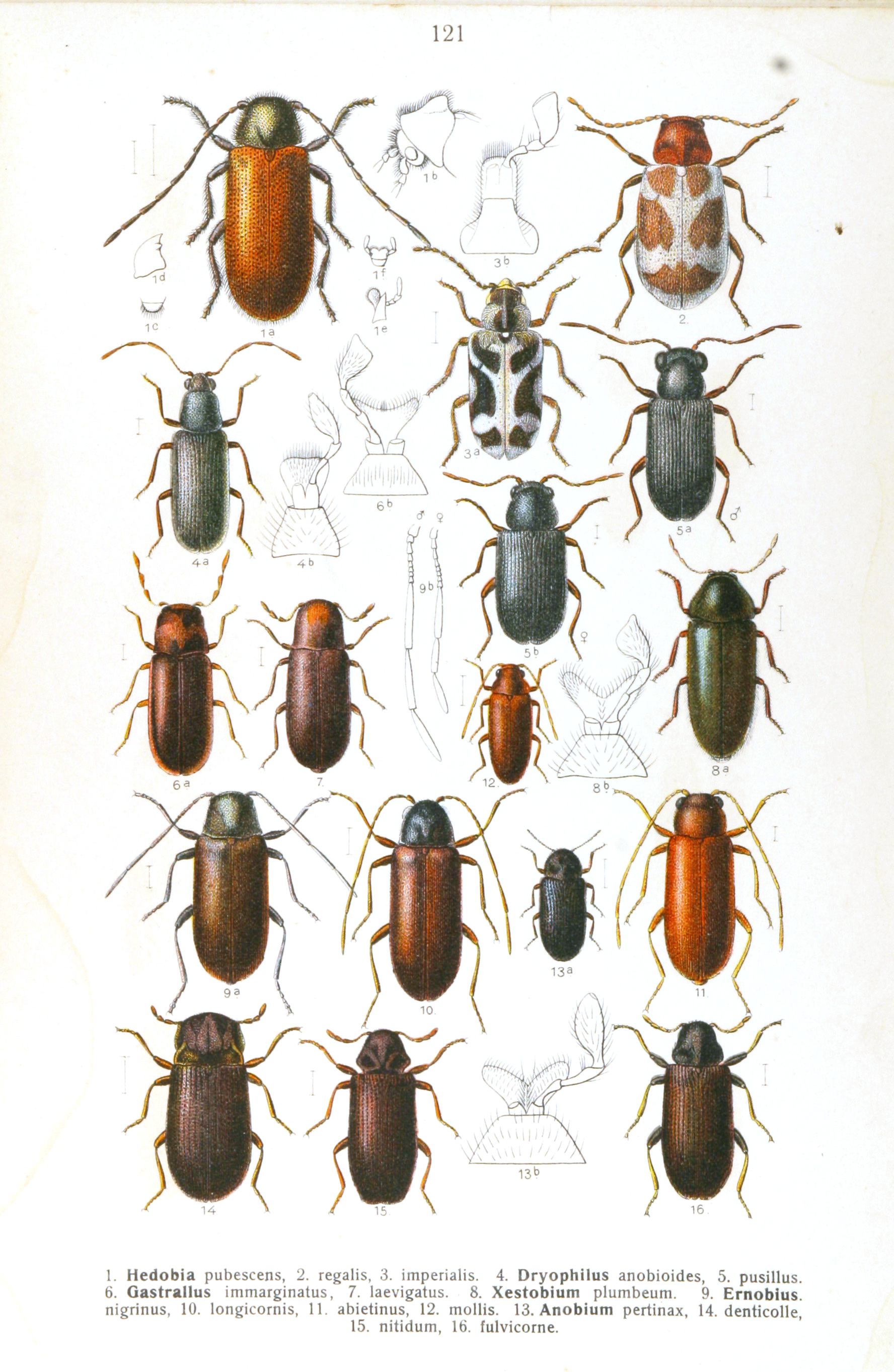
- Dryophilus pusillus figure 5

Scientific classification
- Kingdom: Animalia
- Phylum: Arthropoda
- Class: Insecta
- Order: Coleoptera
- Suborder: Polyphaga
- Family: Ptinidae
- Genus: Dryophilus
- Species: D. pusillus

Binomial name
- Dryophilus pusillus (Gyllenhal, 1808)

Synonyms
- Anobium pusillus Gyllenhal, 1808; Dryophilus semipallidus Pic, 1902; Anobium striatellum Beck, 1817

= Dryophilus pusillus =

Species of beetle

Dryophilus pusillus is a species of beetle in the family Ptinidae. It is widespread in Europe.
