= Heteronyx chlorotica =

Scientific classification
- Kingdom: Animalia
- Phylum: Arthropoda
- Clade: Pancrustacea
- Class: Insecta
- Order: Coleoptera
- Suborder: Polyphaga
- Infraorder: Scarabaeiformia
- Family: Scarabaeidae
- Genus: Heteronyx
- Species: H. chlorotica

Binomial name
- Heteronyx chlorotica (Gyllenhal, 1817)

Synonyms
- Melolontha chlorotica Gyllenhal, 1817; Heteronyx fissiceps Blackburn, 1890

Species of beetle

Heteronyx chlorotica is a species of beetle of the family Scarabaeidae. It is found in Australia (New South Wales, Australian Capital Territory, Victoria, South Australia).

== Description ==
Adults reach a length of about 6–8 mm (0.24–0.31 in). They have a testaceous body. The pygidium is covered with a mixture of short and some long setae.
