= Carl Petter Törnebladh =

19th-century Swedish politician

Prime Minister for Justice
- In office 1840–1843
- Monarch: Charles XIV John
- Preceded by: Arvid Mauritz Posse
- Succeeded by: Lars Herman Gyllenhaal

Personal details
- Born: November 3, 1774; Bergunda församling, Kronoberg County
- Died: June 17, 1844 (aged 69); Stockholm, Stockholm County
- Political party: None
- Spouse: Sofia Charlotta von Oldensköld

Carl Petter Törnebladh (November 3, 1774 – June 17, 1844) was a Swedish politician and Lord of the Realm, who served as Prime Minister for Justice between 1840 and 1843.

Born to Anders Törnebladh, a member of the Bure kinship and Beata Unge. The family had been raised to the untitled nobility in 1720. He received his education at Lund University, earing a degree in law. Prior to assuming the office of Prime Minister for Justice, Törnebladh had been appointed parliamentary ombudsman by the Estates as well as acting Chancellor of Justice.

Political offices
Preceded by Arvid Mauritz Posse	Prime Minister for Justice; 1840–1843	Succeeded by Lars Herman Gyllenhaal
