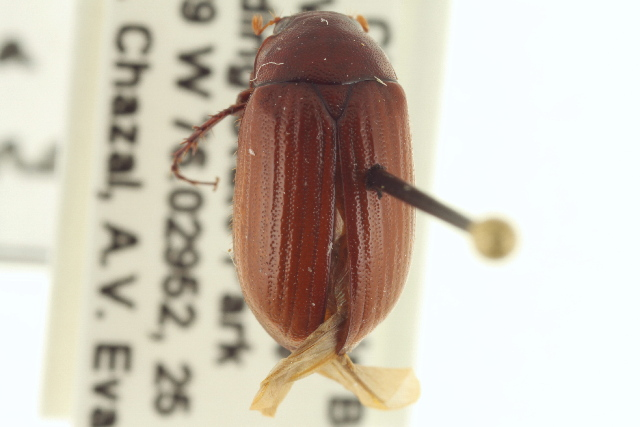

Scientific classification
- Kingdom: Animalia
- Phylum: Arthropoda
- Class: Insecta
- Order: Coleoptera
- Suborder: Polyphaga
- Infraorder: Scarabaeiformia
- Family: Scarabaeidae
- Genus: Serica
- Species: S. vespertina

Binomial name
- Serica vespertina (Gyllenhal, 1817)

Synonyms
- Melolontha vespertina Gyllenhal, 1817

= Serica vespertina =

Species of beetle

Serica vespertina is a species of scarab beetle in the family Scarabaeidae. It is found in North America, where it has been recorded from the United States.

== Description ==
Adults reach a length of about 8.5 mm. The colour is uniformly light brown (amber brown to argus brown). The surface is bare, polished and shining.

== Subspecies ==
These two subspecies belong to the species Serica vespertina:

- Serica vespertina vespertina (New Hampshire to Michigan, south to Florida and Alabama, Colorado, Indiana, Maryland, Wisconsin)
- Serica vespertina accola Dawson, 1921 (Alabama, Iowa, Mississippi, Nebraska, Texas)
