= Gyllenhaal family =

Swedish noble family

Gyllenhaal
- Swedish noble family
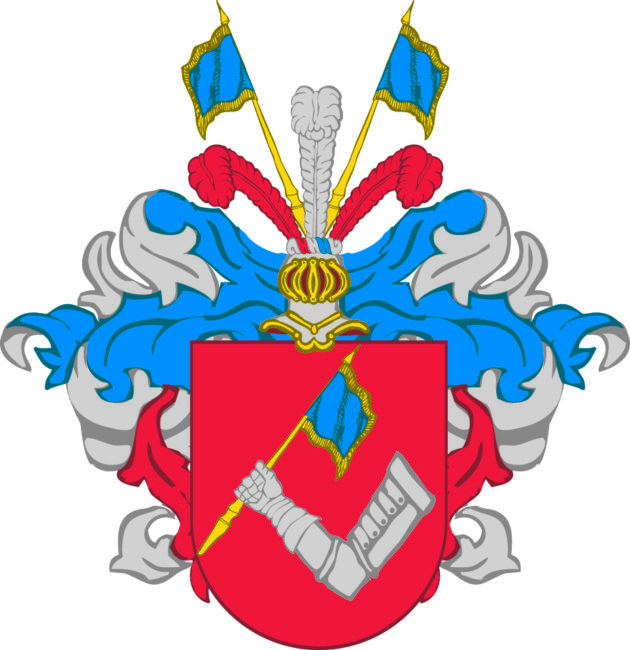
- Country: Sweden
- Origin: Älvsborg County, Sweden
- Founded: 1652; 374 years ago
- Titles: Baron Gyllenhaal (1837); Baron Gyllenhaal till Härlingstorp (1843)

The Gyllenhaal family (Swedish: [ˈjʏ̂lːɛnˌhɑːl]) is a Swedish noble family descended from cavalry officer Lieutenant Nils Gunnarsson Haal (died 1680 or 1681), ennobled in 1652 with a change of name to "Gyllenhaal".

== Family name ==
The name "Gyllenhaal" originated from Nils Gunnarsson Gyllenhaal's father Gunne Olofsson Haal, who was from Hahlegården, a crown homestead in Södra Härene parish in the province of Västergötland in southwestern Sweden. Haal comes from the name of the farm estate "Hahlegården". In the knighthood letter, signed by Queen Christina, the family name was written in two different ways — first "Gyllenhahl" and then "Gyllenhaal". On the copperplate with his coat of arms now hanging in the House of Nobility (Riddarhuset) in Stockholm, it is spelled "Gyllenhahl". Such ambiguities are typical of the time; it would be several generations before Swedish spelling was more strictly regulated. The prefix Gyllen ("Golden") was the one most used when ennobling someone since the 16th century. (Note: Similarly for the naming of Pehr Gustaf Gyllenhammar, the former head of car manufacturer Volvo, and Sofia Johansdotter Gyllenhielm.)

Actor Jake Gyllenhaal, great-great grandson of the below-mentioned Anders Leonard Gyllenhaal, quipped during an interview before the British premiere of Prince of Persia that his last name was pronounced "Yil-en-hoo-luh-hay", parodying Americans' difficulties with Swedish pronunciation. (Note: In Danish, a double "aa" as in Gyllenhaal has for centuries normally been pronounced as [ɔː] (like RP English "thought" (/θɔːt/)). In older Swedish, however, it may have been pronounced with a more open [ɑː] (like RP English "father" (/fɑːðər/)); the double "aa", as with the "ah" in the alternative "Gyllenhahl" (see above) only indicates [ɑː]. The [ɔː] corresponding to Danish "aa" was normally rendered by "å" ("åå", "åh").) (Note: The second problem for English-speakers is how to pronounce the prefix "Gyllen", i.e. Golden. The USA branch of the family's solution is to pronounce it JIL-ən, but in Swedish, the first "Gy" element is instead pronounced as a voiced palatal approximant followed by a near-close near-front rounded vowel (see above for IPA transcription of the full name in Swedish).)

== Family history ==
Nils Gunnarsson Gyllenhaal's descendants today stem from two of his sons: Lars Gyllenhaal (1645–1710), Lieutenant of the Vestgotha cavalry regiment; and his younger brother Hans Gyllenhaal (1655–1710). Hans was killed in action at the Battle of Helsingborg as a cavalry captain.

The members of the older branch descending from Lars still live in Sweden. The most notable member of that branch was the Minister for Justice Lars Herman Gyllenhaal. In 1851, he was created Knight and Commander of the Royal Order of the Seraphim. His great-great grandson, Baron Herman Gyllenhaal of Härlingstorp (born 1934), is now the head of both branches of the noble family Gyllenhaal. He has a son, Lars.

All the members of the family in the United States are descended from Hans Gyllenhaal through his great great-great grandson Anders Leonard (1842–1905) and his wife Amanda (née Nelson, 1859–1948). Anders Leonard Gyllenhaal emigrated to the United States in 1865. A prominent member of this younger branch was Leonard Gyllenhaal (1752–1840). In 1807, he was created a Knight of the Royal Order of Vasa for his scientific work as an entomologist, including his monograph on Swedish insects, Insecta Suecia descripta.

== Notable members ==
- Johan Abraham Gyllenhaal (1750–1788), geologist and mineralogist.
- Leonard Gyllenhaal (1752–1840), military officer and gentleman farmer, known as an entomologist and a leading Swedenborgian. His best-known work was his monograph on Swedish beetles, Insecta suecica. Coleoptera in 4 parts, published between 1808 and 1827.
- Carl Henrik Gyllenhaal (1788–1857), a military officer who participated in the Finnish War of 1808–1809, was later Governor of Blekinge County and Skaraborg County, Privy Councilor, and finally Director General of the Swedish customs. Created a baron in 1837.
- Lars Herman Gyllenhaal (1790–1858), Swedish Prime Minister for Justice 1843–1844. Created a baron in 1843.
- Mathilda d'Orozco (1796–1863), singer, composer and socialite; married in her third marriage to cavalry lieutenant Baron Carl Alexander Fredrik Gyllenhaal, son of Carl Henrik Gyllenhaal and his wife, Hedvig Charlotta Rudbeck (1789-1826). Matilda was a Spanish countess, born in Milan, Italy. She was first married to the stablemaster of Napoleon I's sister; in 1817, widowed, she married J. Montgomery-Cederhjelm in Vienna and became a leading figure and "trendsetter" in Stockholm society. In 1825 she was widowed again; she married a third time in 1839 to Carl Gyllenhaal. She was the subject of a poem by the leading Swedish poet Esaias Tegnér, and a song by Erik Gustaf Geijer; she herself wrote songs and set Tegnér's Rings Drapa to music.
- Anders Leonard Gyllenhaal (1842–1905), grandson of Leonard G., editor-in-chief of the Swedish-American newspaper Svenska Amerikanaren Tribunen in Chicago. Ancestor of the American branch.
- Stephen Gyllenhaal (born 1949), film director and poet, great grandson of Anders Leonard G., was married to producer and screenwriter Naomi Foner Gyllenhaal.
- Maggie Gyllenhaal (born 1977), Academy Award-nominated American actress and filmmaker, daughter of Stephen G.
- Jake Gyllenhaal (born 1980), Academy Award-nominated American actor, son of Stephen G.
- Sam Gyllenhaal, musician, videographer, son of Anders G.

== Family tree ==
- Nils Gunnesson Gyllenhaal (1600-1680) ∞ Märta Hierta (1610-1697)
  - Gudmund Gyllenhaal (1643–1701) ∞ Beata Rosendufva (1643-1725)
  - Lars Gyllenhaal (1645–1710) ∞ Anna Maria Rytterström (1667-1712)
    - Lars Gyllenhaal (1690–1756) ∞ Anna Beata of Wrangel-Lindeberg (1695-1728)
      - Lorentz Herman Gyllenhaal (1723–1786) ∞ Fredrika Eleonora Frölich (1721-1772)
        - Lars Herman Gyllenhaal (1757–1830) ∞ Baroness Hedvig Margareta Leuhusen (1763-1857)
          - Lars Herman Gyllenhaal (1790–1858), Swedish Prime Minister for Justice ∞ (1) Henrika Lovisa Ulrika Tham (1791-1816) ∞ (2) Elisabet Sofia Palm (1795-1865); had issue
  - Hans Gyllenhaal (1655–1710) ∞ Barbro Bengtsdotter Lilliestielke (1663-1729)
    - Abraham Rudolph Gyllenhaal (1694–1743) ∞ Maria Christina Lybecker (1700-1739)
      - Georg Rudolf Gyllenhaal (1721–1780) ∞ (1) Catharina Helena Bjerman (1721-1768) ∞ (2) Anna Helena Åkerhielm af Blombacka (1731-1797)
        - Carl Jonas Gyllenhaal (1749–1808) ∞ (1) Florentina Gustava Strömbom (1765-1795) ∞ (2) Baroness Gustafva Eleonora Rudbeck (1767-1828)
          - Carl Henrik Gyllenhaal (1788–1857) ∞ ∞ (1) Baroness Hedvig Charlotta Rudbeck (1789-1826) ∞ (2) Baroness Beata Aurora af Nordin (1803-1884)
            - Carl Alexander Fredrik Gyllenhaal (1814–1910) ∞ (1) Mathilda Valeria Beatrix d'Orozco, Singer, composer and socialite ∞ (2) Ulla Lagercrantz ∞ (3) Alma Ahlstedt
      - Hans Reinhold Gyllenhaal (1724–1796) ∞ Anna Catharina Wahlfelt (1723-1799)
        - Leonard Gyllenhaal (1752–1840), Swedish military officer and entomologist ∞ Anna Hård af Torestorp (1763-1845)
          - Fredrik Leonard Gyllenhaal (1802–1873) ∞ Christina Lovisa Gustava Westling (1811-1846)
            - Anders Leonard Gyllenhaal (1842–1905) ∞ Selma Amanda Nelson (1861-1948)
              - Leonard Efraim Gyllenhaal (1881–1934) ∞ Virginia Phileah Pendleton (1887-1960)
                - Hugh Anders Gyllenhaal (1921–1979) ∞ Virginia Lowrie Childs (1924-2008)
                  - Stephen Gyllenhaal (born 1949), American film director and poet ∞ (1) Naomi Achs (b. 1946) ∞ (2) Kathleen Kwai Ching Man (b. 1974)
                    - Maggie Gyllenhaal (born 1977), American actress and filmmaker ∞ Peter Sarsgaard (b. 1971)
                      - Ramona Sarsgaard (born 2006)
                    - Jake Gyllenhaal (born 1980), American actor and producer
                    - Luke Gyllenhaal (born 2014)

== Bibliography ==
- Nordisk familjebok, 2nd edition, Volume 10, 1909. (on Projekt Runeberg) (in Swedish)
- Svenskt biografiskt handlexikon, Volume 1, 1906 (in Swedish)
