= Dactylispa echinata =

Scientific classification
- Kingdom: Animalia
- Phylum: Arthropoda
- Class: Insecta
- Order: Coleoptera
- Suborder: Polyphaga
- Infraorder: Cucujiformia
- Family: Chrysomelidae
- Genus: Dactylispa
- Species: D. echinata

Binomial name
- Dactylispa echinata (Gyllenhal, 1817)

Synonyms
- Hispa echinata Gyllenhal, 1817; Hispa maculipennis Kraatz, 1895

Species of beetle

Dactylispa echinata is a species of beetle of the family Chrysomelidae. It is found in Angola, Congo, Equatorial Guinea, Ivory Coast, Nigeria, Sierra Leone and Togo.

== Life history ==
The recorded host plant for this species is Oryza sativa.
