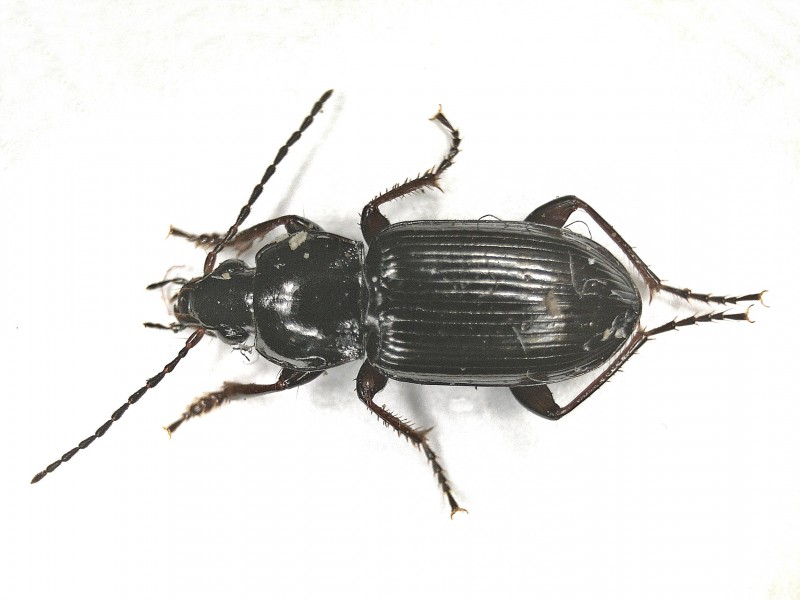

Scientific classification
- Kingdom: Animalia
- Phylum: Arthropoda
- Class: Insecta
- Order: Coleoptera
- Suborder: Adephaga
- Family: Carabidae
- Subfamily: Pterostichinae
- Tribe: Pterostichini
- Genus: Pterostichus
- Species: P. gracilis

Binomial name
- Pterostichus gracilis (Dejean, 1828)

= Pterostichus gracilis =

Species of beetle

Pterostichus gracilis is a species of woodland ground beetle native to Europe.

== Subspecies ==
These two subspecies belong to the species Pterostichus gracilis:

- Pterostichus gracilis giordanii (Bucciarelli & Sopracordevole, 1958)
- Pterostichus gracilis gracilis (Dejean, 1828)
