= Baron Gyllenhaal af Härlingstorp =

Hereditary title

Baron Gyllenhaal till Härlingstorp
- Creation date: 10 November 1837
- Created by: Charles XIV John
- First holder: Lars Herman Gyllenhaal
- Present holder: Lars Gyllenhaal
- Remainder to: Heirs male of the body of the first baron; failing, heirs male of the sons of the first baron's brother

Baron Gyllenhaal till Härlingstorp (Swedish: Friherre Gyllenhaal till Härlingstorp, [ˈfrîːˌhærːɛ ˈjʏ̂lːɛnˌhɑːl tɪl ˈhæ̂ːɭɪŋstɔrp]) is a title in the Swedish nobility. It was created in 1843 for Lars Herman Gyllenhaal, a member of the Gyllenhaal family. He was the sixth Swedish Prime Minister for Justice.

== History ==
In Swedish nobility, the title Baron Gyllenhaal (Swedish: Friherre Gyllenhaal) was created in 1837 for Carl Henrik Gyllenhaal and went extinct in 1910.

== Barons Gyllenhaal till Härlingstorp ==
- Lars Herman Gyllenhaal till Härlingstorp (1790–1858)
- Lars Herman Gyllenhaal till Härlingstorp (1821–1912)
- Lars Herman Gyllenhaal till Härlingstorp (1865–1957)
- Lars Herman Gyllenhaal till Härlingstorp (1906-1983)
- Lars Herman Gyllenhaal till Härlingstorp (1934-2023)
- Lars Herman Folke Gyllenhaal till Härlingstorp (b. 1968)
