= Dactylispa spinigera =

Scientific classification
- Kingdom: Animalia
- Phylum: Arthropoda
- Class: Insecta
- Order: Coleoptera
- Suborder: Polyphaga
- Infraorder: Cucujiformia
- Family: Chrysomelidae
- Genus: Dactylispa
- Species: D. spinigera

Binomial name
- Dactylispa spinigera (Gyllenhal, 1817)

Synonyms
- Hispa spinigera Gyllenhal, 1817; Dactylispa gologoloensis Uhmann, 1928

Species of beetle

Dactylispa spinigera is a species of beetle of the family Chrysomelidae. It is found in Cameroon, Congo, Guinea, Ivory Coast, Kenya, Rwanda, Sierra Leone, Tanzania, Togo, Uganda and Zimbabwe.

== Life history ==
The recorded host plant for this species is Oryza sativa.
