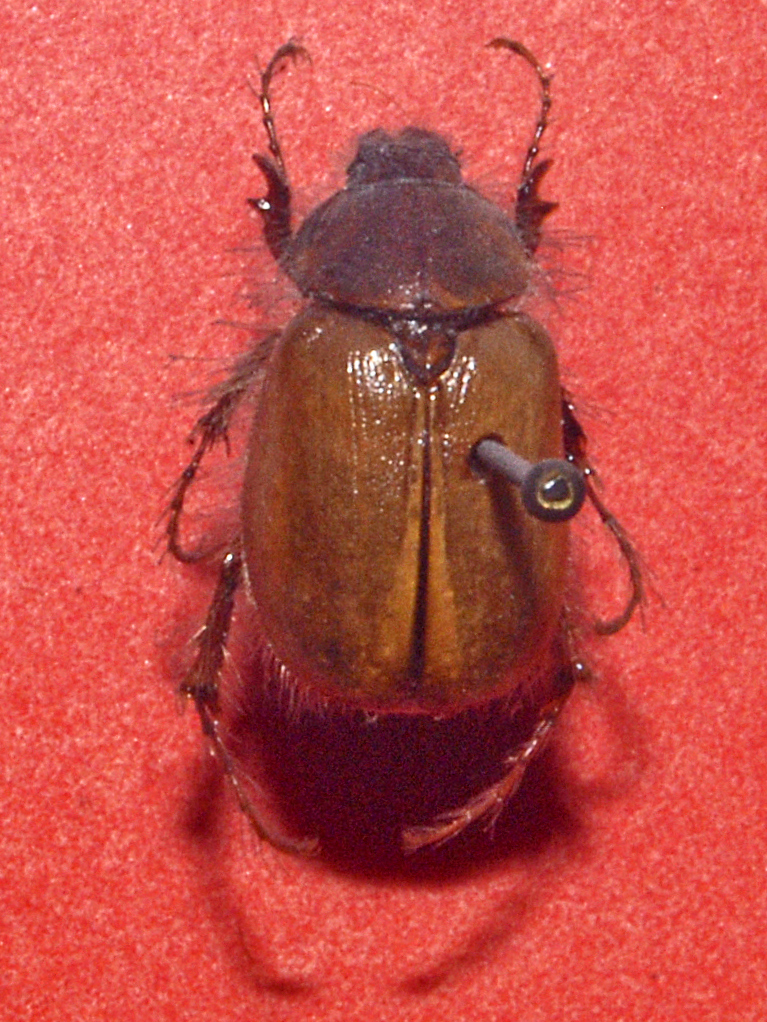
- Elaphocera emarginata. Museum specimen

Scientific classification
- Kingdom: Animalia
- Phylum: Arthropoda
- Class: Insecta
- Order: Coleoptera
- Suborder: Polyphaga
- Infraorder: Scarabaeiformia
- Family: Scarabaeidae
- Genus: Elaphocera
- Species: E. emarginata

Binomial name
- Elaphocera emarginata (Gyllenhal, 1817)

Synonyms
- Elaphocera obscura Gené, 1836; Elaphocera sardoa Rambur, 1843

= Elaphocera emarginata =

Species of beetle

Elaphocera emarginata is a species of dung beetles belonging to the family Scarabaeidae.

== Description ==
Elaphocera emarginata can reach a length of 10–12 millimetres (0.39–0.47 in). Body is brown-black, while females are usually reddish. The basis of the pronotum is hairy.

== Distribution ==
This species is endemic to Sardinia.
