= Henriette Killander =

Swedish furniture designer and music composer

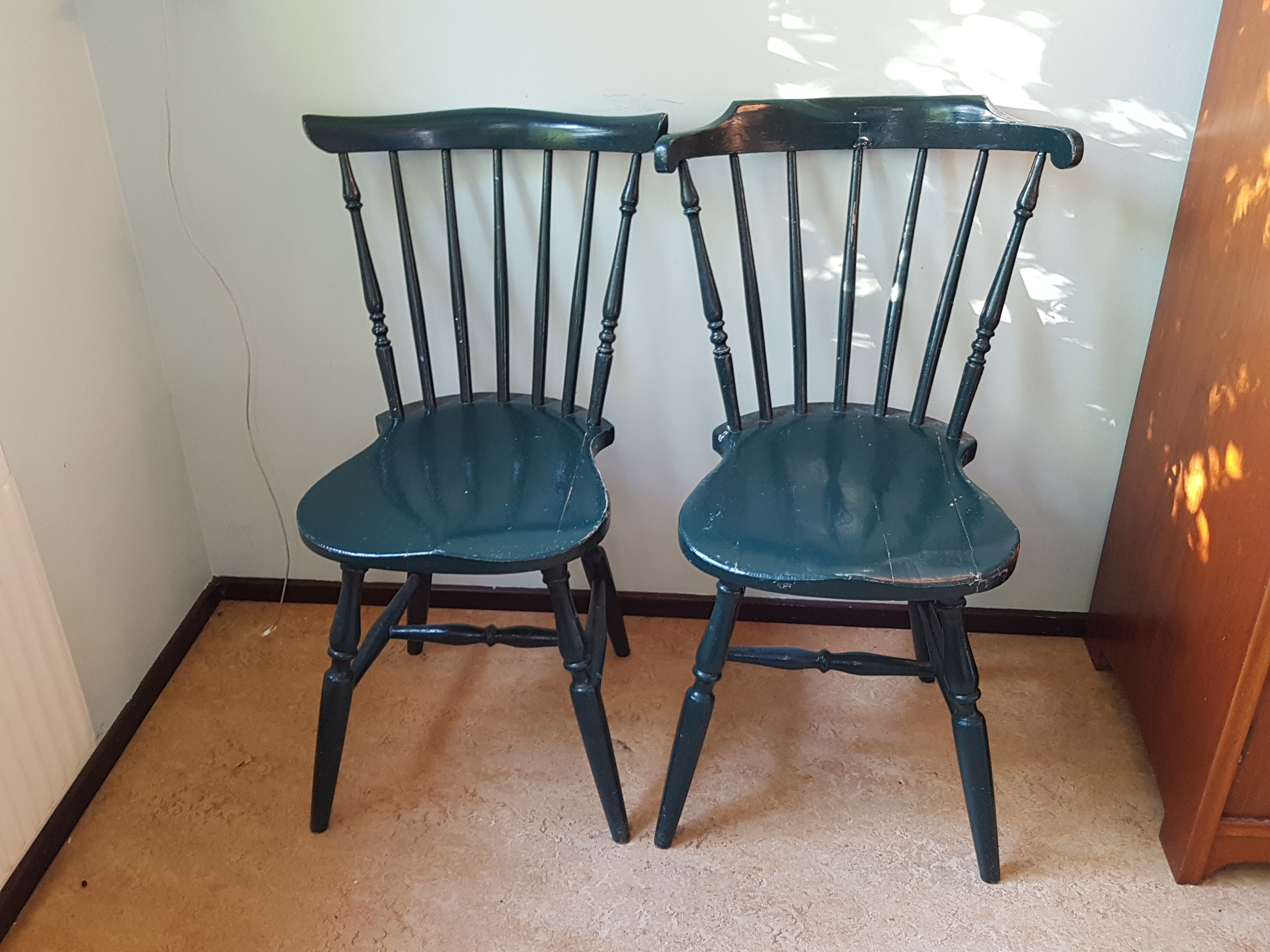
Early pinnstols

Henriette Killander (1816–1898), was a Swedish furniture designer and music composer.

She was born to justice minister baron Lars Herman Gyllenhaal and Henrika Lovisa Ulrika Tham (1791–1816) and married in 1838 to an official of the royal court, Johan Fredrik Killander (1811–1899). The couple lived on the Hooks manor outside Jönköping.

She is known as the designer of the immensely popular chair model pinnstol, which she designed after being inspired by the Windsor chair which she had brought home after a trip to USA, and then had made by the carpenter Daniel Ljungquist in Svenarum in the 1850s, which inspired major chair industry in Småland.

She also composed the song and piano music Jag icke någon vällust känner, which was included in the ”Åtskilliga sångstycken med accompagnement af pianoforte” (literary: 'Several Pieces of Songs for the Fortepiano').
