= Euserica mutata =

Scientific classification
- Kingdom: Animalia
- Phylum: Arthropoda
- Class: Insecta
- Order: Coleoptera
- Suborder: Polyphaga
- Infraorder: Scarabaeiformia
- Family: Scarabaeidae
- Genus: Euserica
- Species: E. mutata

Binomial name
- Euserica mutata (Gyllenhal, 1817)

Synonyms
- Melolontha mutata Gyllenhal, 1817; Serica ariasi Mulsant & Rey, 1871

Species of beetle

Euserica mutata is a species of beetle of the family Scarabaeidae. It is found in Portugal and Spain.

== Description ==
Adults reach a length of about 7–8 mm. The upper surface is entirely blackish-brown, but sometimes reddish, except for the light yellowish-brown antennae and the slightly lighter tibiae. The underside is lighter reddish-brown. They have a glossy appearance. The head has strong punctation. The pronotum is covered with simple, fine, and sparse punctation anteriorly, becoming coarser posteriorly. The striae of the elytra are densely and strongly punctate.
