= Sparreneset =

Headland of Nordaustlandet, Svalbard

Coordinates: 79.8997°N 18.1040°E

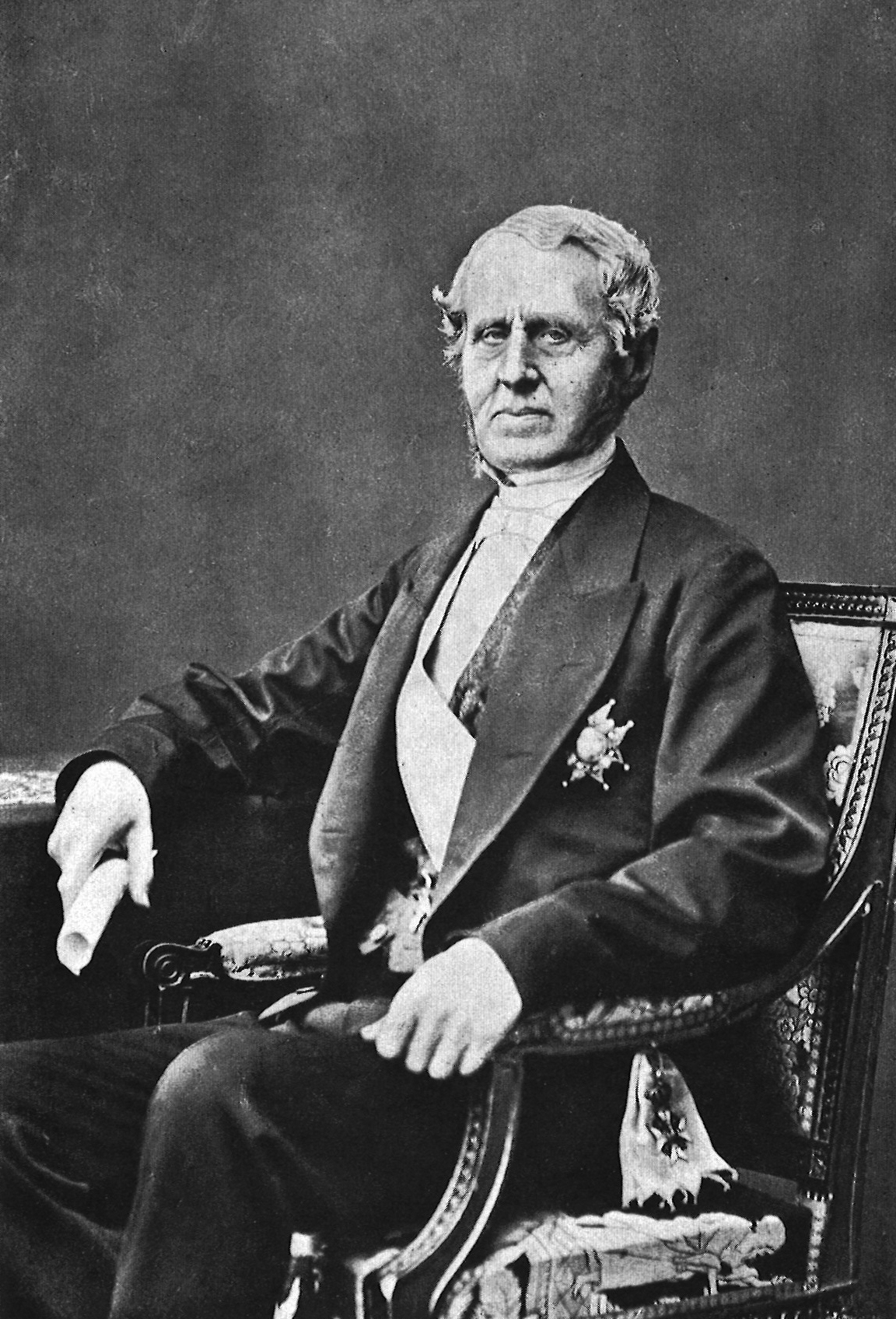
Sparreneset is named after Gustaf Adolf Vive Sparre.

Sparreneset is a headland in Gustav V Land at Nordaustlandet, Svalbard. It is located south of the mouth of Murchisonfjorden, about five nautical miles north of Dolomittøyane and extends about one nautical mile into Hinlopen Strait. The headland is named after Swedish politician Gustaf Adolf Vive Sparre.
