= Arvid Mauritz Posse =

Swedish politician

His Excellency The High Well-born Count Arvid Mauritz Posse
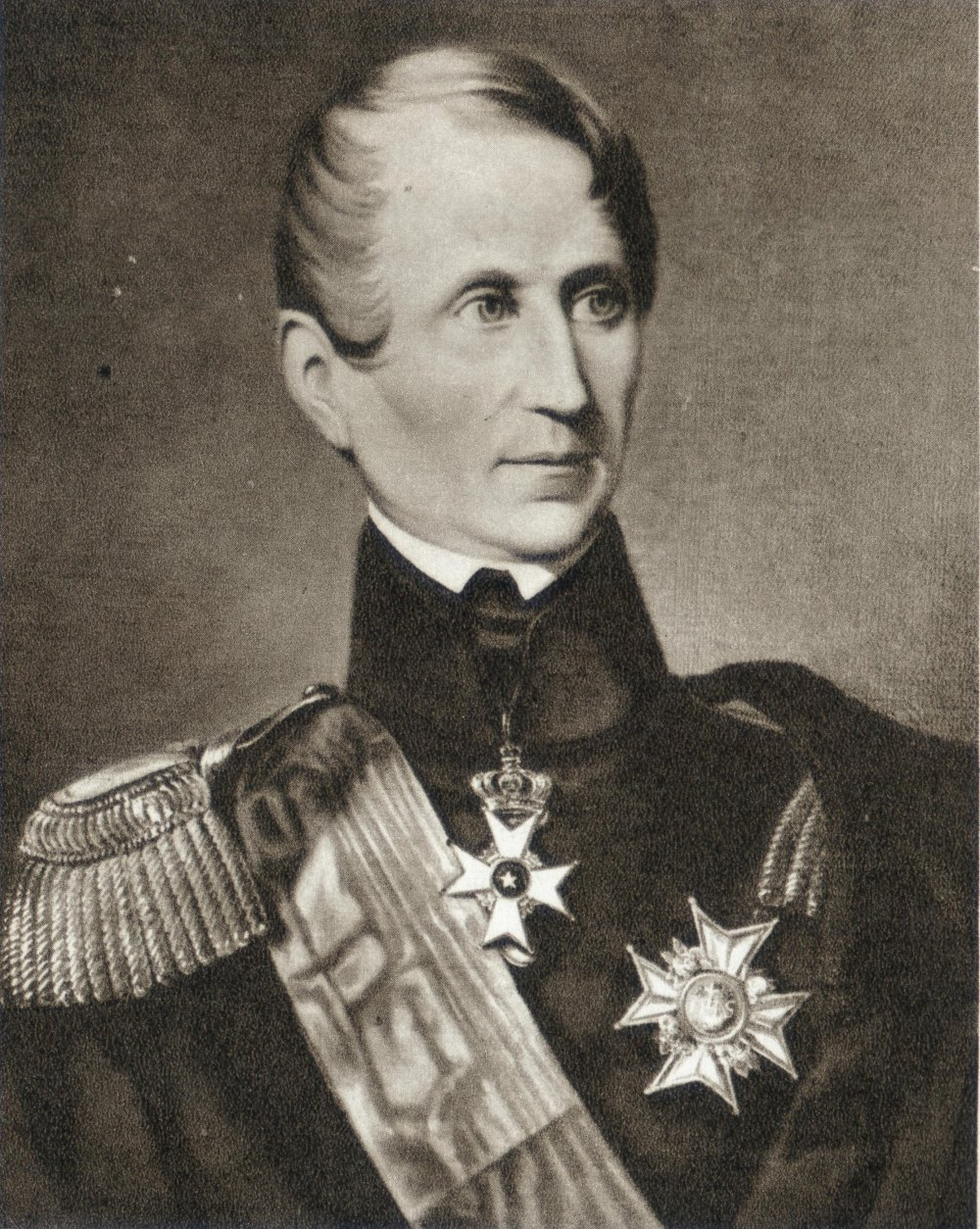
- Portrait by Johan Gustaf Sandberg, 1845.

Prime Minister for Justice
- In office 16 May 1840 – 5 September 1840
- Monarchs: Charles XIV John; Oscar I
- Preceded by: Mathias Rosenblad
- Succeeded by: Carl Petter Törnebladh
- In office 23 March 1846 – 10 April 1848
- Preceded by: Johan Nordenfalk
- Succeeded by: Gustaf Adolf Vive Sparre

Personal details
- Born: 5 January 1796; Bergunda, Kronoberg County
- Died: 22 July 1850 (aged 58); Gothenburg, Västra Götaland County
- Political party: None

Arvid Mauritz Posse (5 January 1792 – 22 July 1850) was a Swedish count and politician who served as Prime Minister for Justice briefly in 1840 and again from 1846 and 1848. Posse was also Marshal of the Realm from 1845 to 1849.

== Biography ==
Posse was born into a noble family, as the son of Count and Lord of the Realm Arvid Erik Posse and his wife, the baroness Catharina Charlotta von Otter. The family was of Jutlandic origin and belonged to the high nobility, having been raised to countship in 1706. Posse received his education at Lund University. He went on to work at Göta Court of Appeal and later became an assessor at the Svea Court of Appeal in 1816. Prior to his appointment as Prime Minister for Justice, Posse had served as governor of Skaraborg County as well as director-general of the Swedish Customs Service.

By 1840, Posse became known for his liberal positions in matters concerning free trade in the Riksdag of the Estates and following the government resignation in 1840, the king had him appointed Prime Minister for Justice. This was done in order to ease the pressure from the liberal opposition. However, his term at the office become short and Posse was forced to resign later that same year. During the Riksdag of 1845, Posse was appointed Marshal of the Realm. This eventually lead to him being appointed for a second time as Prime Minister for Justice in the government of 1846. Following the political turmoil after the March Unrest and due to popular protests against the government, Posse resigned from his office in 1848 along with his most of his cabinet.

In 1849, due to his declining health Posse resigned as Marshal of the Realm and died the following year in Gothenburg.

He was the uncle of Prime Minister Arvid Posse.

Political offices
Preceded by Mathias Rosenblad	Prime Minister for Justice; 1840	Succeeded by Carl Petter Törnebladh
Preceded by Johan Nordenfalk	Prime Minister for Justice; 1846–1848	Succeeded by Gustaf Adolf Vive Sparre
Court offices
Preceded by Magnus Brahe	Marshal of the Realm of Sweden; 1845–1849	Succeeded by Mauritz Axel Lewenhaupt
