= Euserica =

Scientific classification
- Kingdom: Animalia
- Phylum: Arthropoda
- Class: Insecta
- Order: Coleoptera
- Suborder: Polyphaga
- Infraorder: Scarabaeiformia
- Family: Scarabaeidae
- Subfamily: Sericinae
- Tribe: Sericini
- Genus: Euserica; Reitter, 1896

Genus of leaf beetles

Euserica is a genus of beetles belonging to the family Scarabaeidae.

== Species ==
- Euserica alcaidei Baraud, 1965
- Euserica alonsoi Ruiz & Ávila, 1993
- Euserica brancobaraudi Ruiz & Ávila, 1995
- Euserica cambeloi Ruiz & Ávila, 1993
- Euserica cobosi Baraud, 1965
- Euserica fernandezcarbajalesi López-Colón, 2024
- Euserica lopeznievaorum López-Colón, 2024
- Euserica lucipeta Baraud, 1965
- Euserica mamorensis Baraud, 1965
- Euserica monstruosa Baraud & Branco, 1985
- Euserica monticola Baraud, 1965
- Euserica mulsanti (Brenske, 1902)
- Euserica mutata (Gyllenhal, 1817)
- Euserica paenibaeticae Galante, 1987
- Euserica segurana (Brenske, 1898)
- Euserica villarreali Baraud, 1975
