= Euserica lucipeta =

Scientific classification
- Kingdom: Animalia
- Phylum: Arthropoda
- Class: Insecta
- Order: Coleoptera
- Suborder: Polyphaga
- Infraorder: Scarabaeiformia
- Family: Scarabaeidae
- Genus: Euserica
- Species: E. lucipeta

Binomial name
- Euserica lucipeta Baraud, 1965

Species of beetle

Euserica lucipeta is a species of beetle of the family Scarabaeidae. It is found in France, Portugal and Spain.

== Description ==
Adults reach a length of about 7–8 mm. The upper surface colour varies from reddish-brown to various shades of brown, and even black. In darker specimens, only the antennae and palps remain pale yellowish-brown. The underside is paler. It has a slightly glossy appearance. The head has fine, very dense punctation. The pronotum is covered with fine, fairly dense punctation. The elytra has densely punctate striae, with the interstriae smooth and with very sparse punctation.
