= Euserica paenibaeticae =

Scientific classification
- Kingdom: Animalia
- Phylum: Arthropoda
- Class: Insecta
- Order: Coleoptera
- Suborder: Polyphaga
- Infraorder: Scarabaeiformia
- Family: Scarabaeidae
- Genus: Euserica
- Species: E. paenibaeticae

Binomial name
- Euserica paenibaeticae Galante, 1987

Species of beetle

Euserica paenibaeticae is a species of beetle of the family Scarabaeidae. It is found in Spain.

== Description ==
Adults reach a length of about 8–9 mm. They are castaneous brown or sometimes very dark and slightly lighter underneath. The antennae are yellowish.
