= Lord of the Realm =

Former Swedish honorary title

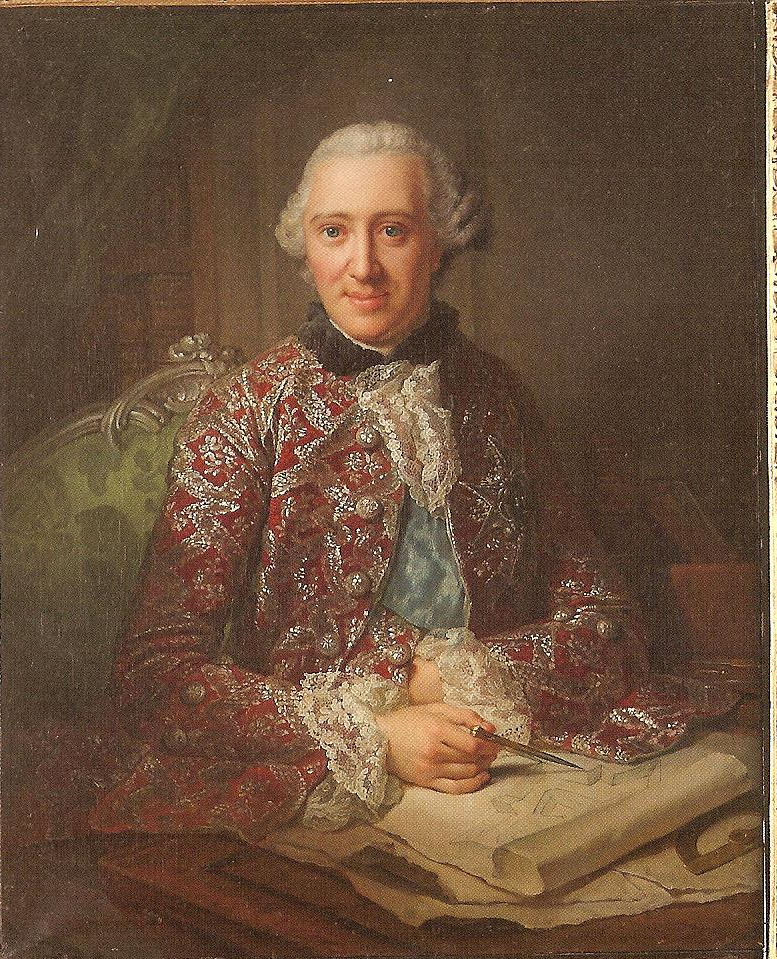
Portrait of Frederick William, Prince von Hessenstein, the first titleholder.

The Lord of the Realm (Swedish: En av rikets herrar, lit. 'one of the lords of the realm') was a title of honour introduced by Gustavus III, King of Sweden shortly after his coup and the newly passed constitution. The title was granted by the King and was first received by Frederick William, Prince von Hessenstein on 15 January 1773 by letter. One of the most famous title holders was Hans Axel, Count von Fersen, the supposed lover and confidant of Marie Antoinette, Queen of France.

The title was not hereditary nor assigned with any function or appointment at the Royal Court or in public life. It was simply meant as a great honour bestowed upon deserving individuals after years of accomplished service to the King and Country. The title holder was styled "Excellency" and ranked equal to Privy Councillors. They also had the right to wear the Privy Councillor's robes. On 10 January 1868, the title was officially defunct.

== List of title holders ==
The following list is in alphabetical order:

- Gustaf Mauritz Armfelt (1757–1814)
- Carl Julius Bernhard von Bohlen (1738–1813)
- Magnus Fredrik Ferdinand Björnstjerna (1779–1847)
- Magnus Fredrik Brahe (1756–1826)
- Magnus Brahe (1790–1844)
- Germund Ludvig Cederhielm (1755–1841)
- Gustaf Philip Creutz (1731–1785)
- Carl De Geer (1781–1861)
- Louis De Geer the Elder (1818–1896)
- Pontus Fredrik De la Gardie (1726–1791)
- Jacob De la Gardie (1768–1842)
- Hans Henric von Essen (1755–1824)
- Carl Reinhold von Fersen (1716–1786)
- Fabian Reinhold von Fersen (1762–1818)
- Axel von Fersen the Younger (1755–1810)
- Claes Adolph Fleming (1771–1831)
- Adolf Fredrik Nils Gyldenstolpe (1799–1864)
- Lars Herman Gyllenhaal (1790–1858)
- Gustaf David Hamilton (1699–1788)
- Frederick William von Hessenstein (1735–1808)
- Claes Horn (1755–1823)
- Albrecht Elof Ihre (1797–1877)
- Wilhelm Mauritz Klingspor (1744–1814)
- Arvid Fredrik Kurck (1735–1810)
- Elias Lagerheim (1791–1864)
- Charles Emil Lewenhaupt the Younger (1721–1796)
- Gustaf Lewenhaupt (1780–1844)
- Gustaf Carl Fredrik Löwenhielm (1771–1856)
- Carl Axel Löwenhielm (1772–1861)
- Salomon Löfvenskiöld (1764–1850)
- Johan August Meijerfeldt the Younger (1725–1800)
- Carl Carlsson Mörner af Tuna (1755–1821)
- Carl Stellan Mörner af Morlanda (1761–1834)
- Adolf Göran Mörner af Morlanda (1773–1838)
- Johan Gabriel Oxenstierna (1750–1818)
- Carl Clas Piper (1770–1850)
- Filip Julius Bernhard von Platen (1732–1805)
- Carl Henric Posse (1767–1843)
- Arvid Mauritz Posse (1792–1850)
- Fredric Arvidsson Posse (1727–1794)
- Johan af Puke (1751–1816)
- Gustaf Adolf Reuterholm (1756–1813)
- Mathias Rosenblad (1758–1847)
- Johan August Sandels (1764–1831)
- Anders Fredrik Skjöldebrand (1757–1834)
- Gustaf Adolf Sparre af Söfdeborg (1802–1886)
- Gabriel Spens (1712–1781)
- Jakob Wilhelm Sprengtporten (1794–1875)
- Curt von Stedingk (1746–1837)
- Gustaf Algernon Stierneld (1791–1868)
- Johan Christopher Toll (1743–1817)
- Samuel af Ugglas (1750–1812)
- Pehr Gustaf af Ugglas (1784–1853)
- Carl Axel Wachtmeister (1754–1810)
- Claes Adam Wachtmeister (1755–1828)
- Gustaf Wachtmeister (1757–1826)
- Hans Gabriel Trolle-Wachtmeister (1782–1871)
- Gustaf af Wetterstedt (1776–1837)
- Anton Johan Wrangel the Younger (1724–1799)
- Carl Adam Wrangel af Adinal (1748–1829)
- Fabian Wrede (1760–1824)
- Tage Thott (1739–1824)
- Thure Leonard Klinckowström (1735–1821)
- Nils Posse (1739–1818)
- Gustaf Lagerbjelke (1777–1837)
- Carl Göran Bonde (1757–1840)
- Georg Adlersparre (1760–1835)
- Olof Rudolf Cederström (1764–1833)
- Erik Reinhold Adelswärd (1778–1840)
- Carl Johan Adlercreutz (1757–1815)
- Carl Lagerbring (1751–1822)
- Baltzar Bogislaus von Platen (1766–1829)
