= Euserica brancobaraudi =

Scientific classification
- Kingdom: Animalia
- Phylum: Arthropoda
- Clade: Pancrustacea
- Class: Insecta
- Order: Coleoptera
- Suborder: Polyphaga
- Infraorder: Scarabaeiformia
- Family: Scarabaeidae
- Genus: Euserica
- Species: E. brancobaraudi

Binomial name
- Euserica brancobaraudi Ruiz & Ávila, 1995

Species of beetle

Euserica brancobaraudi is a species of beetle of the family Scarabaeidae. It is found in Morocco.

== Description ==
Adults reach a length of about 8.8 mm. The general colouration of the body is reddish brown, darker on the head and lighter on the ventral surface, legs and pygidium.
