= Carl Julius Bernhard von Bohlen =

German nobleman and Lieutenant General of the Swedish Cavalry

His Excellency Imperial Count Carl Julius Bernhard von Bohlen Lord of the Realm KmstkSO
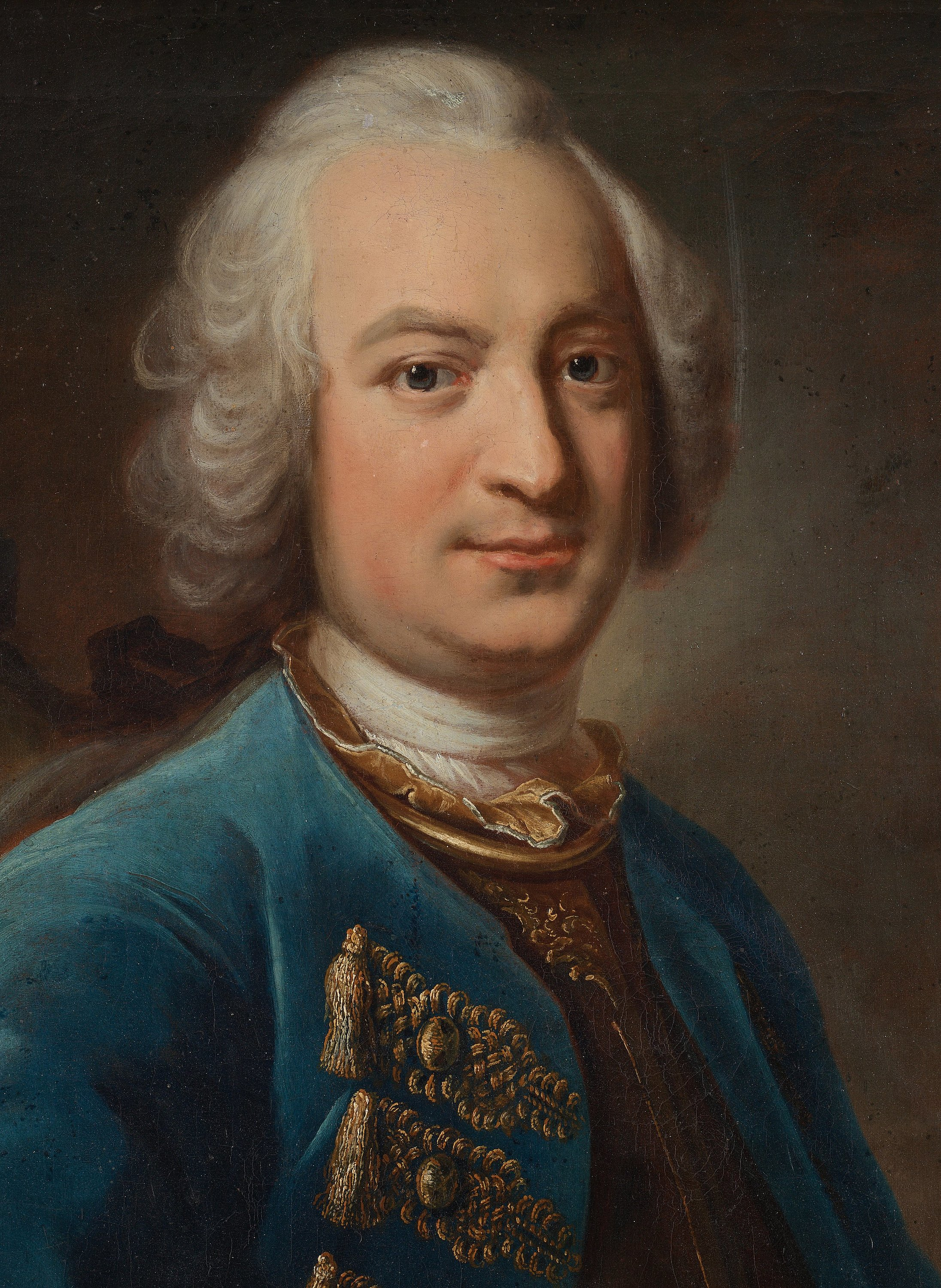
- Portrait by Johan Henrik Scheffel, c. 1770.
- Born: 17 January 1738; Karlsburg Castle, Margraviate of Baden-Durlach, Holy Roman Empire
- Died: 10 January 1813 (aged 74)
- Noble family: Bohlen family
- Spouses: Hedwig Birgitte von Krassow; Agnes Christiane von Stranz
- Issue: Hedwig Anna; Carl Philipp; Friedrich Ludwig; Caroline Louise Ulrike
- Father: Carl Heinrich Bernd von Bohlen
- Mother: Anna Eleonora von Normann

Carl Julius Bernhard von Bohlen (17 January 1738 – 10 January 1813) was a German nobleman and Lieutenant General of the Swedish Cavalry.

== Biography ==
Carl Julius Bernhard was born on 17 January 1738 at the Karlsburg Castle to Carl Heinrich Bernd von Bohlen (1705–1757) and Anna Eleonora von Normann (1712–1752), thus making him a member of the Bohlen family. The comital family originated from Prussia, but the main branch later settled in Pomerania (what came to be Swedish Pomerania). His father was an Imperial Count and Justice of the Supreme Administrative Court of Swedish Pomerania. Eventually, Carl Julius Bernhard was appointed Lieutenant General of the Swedish Cavalry and Lord of the Realm. He also was awarded Commander Grand Cross of the Order of the Sword.

He married twice, first with Hedwig Birgitte von Krassow (1739–1778) and second with Agnes Christiane von Stranz (born 1747). One of their descendants married Wilhelm II, German Emperor. He was styled as:

His Excellency Imperial Count, Carl Julius Bernhard von Bohlen, Lord of the Realm, Commander Grand Cross of the Order of the Sword, Hereditary Lord of Karlsburg, Jasedow, Steinfurt and Zarkow, Lord of Murchin, Libbenow, Crenzow and Zarrentin
