= Claës Günther =

Swedish politician and jurist

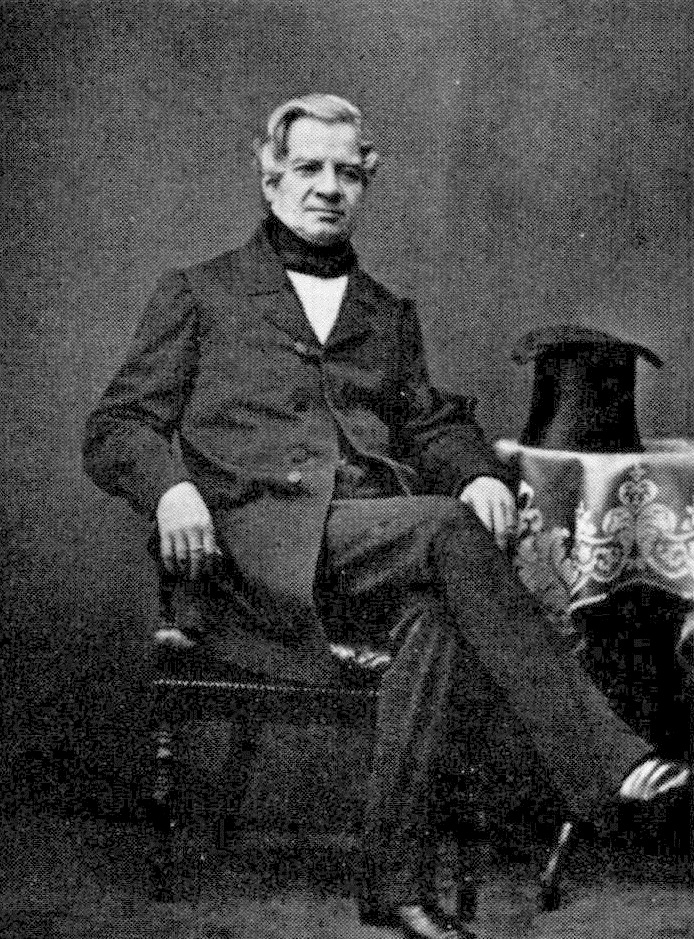
Claës Günther

Claës Efraim Günther (29 or 30 December 1799 – 23 July 1861) was a Swedish politician and jurist who served as Prime Minister for Justice between 1856 and 1858.

== Biography ==
Günther was born into a noble family in Örebro, as the son of Christian Ernst Günther and Agneta Charlotta Carpelan. The family was of Prussian origin and had been raised to the untitled nobility in 1720.

He received his education at Uppsala University, obtaining a Master of Philosophy in 1824. Upon finishing his studies he went on to work as a notary at the Svea Court of Appeal.

Günther first entered politics acting as a representative of the nobility at the Riksdag of the Estates in 1828. During the Riksdag of 1844–1845, Günther came to be known as an avid advocate for reforming the penal code as well as one of few members in the House of Nobility to argue in favour of equal inheritance rights between men and women. In 1845, he became a member of a legislative committee whose task was to draft a new statute of laws regarding the inheritance of property and family law.

In response to the March Unrest of 1848, king Oscar I appointed Günther to serve as minister without portfolio in the Council of State. He resigned from the council in 1851, and was subsequently made a judge at the supreme court. In 1856, Günther was reinstated in the government, this time as Prime Minister for Justice, an office he held until 1858 when he was forced to resign due to pressures from the Crown Prince.

He was the paternal grandfather of Christian Günther.

Preceded by Gustaf Adolf Vive Sparre	Prime Minister for Justice; 1856–1858	Succeeded by Louis Gerhard De Geer
