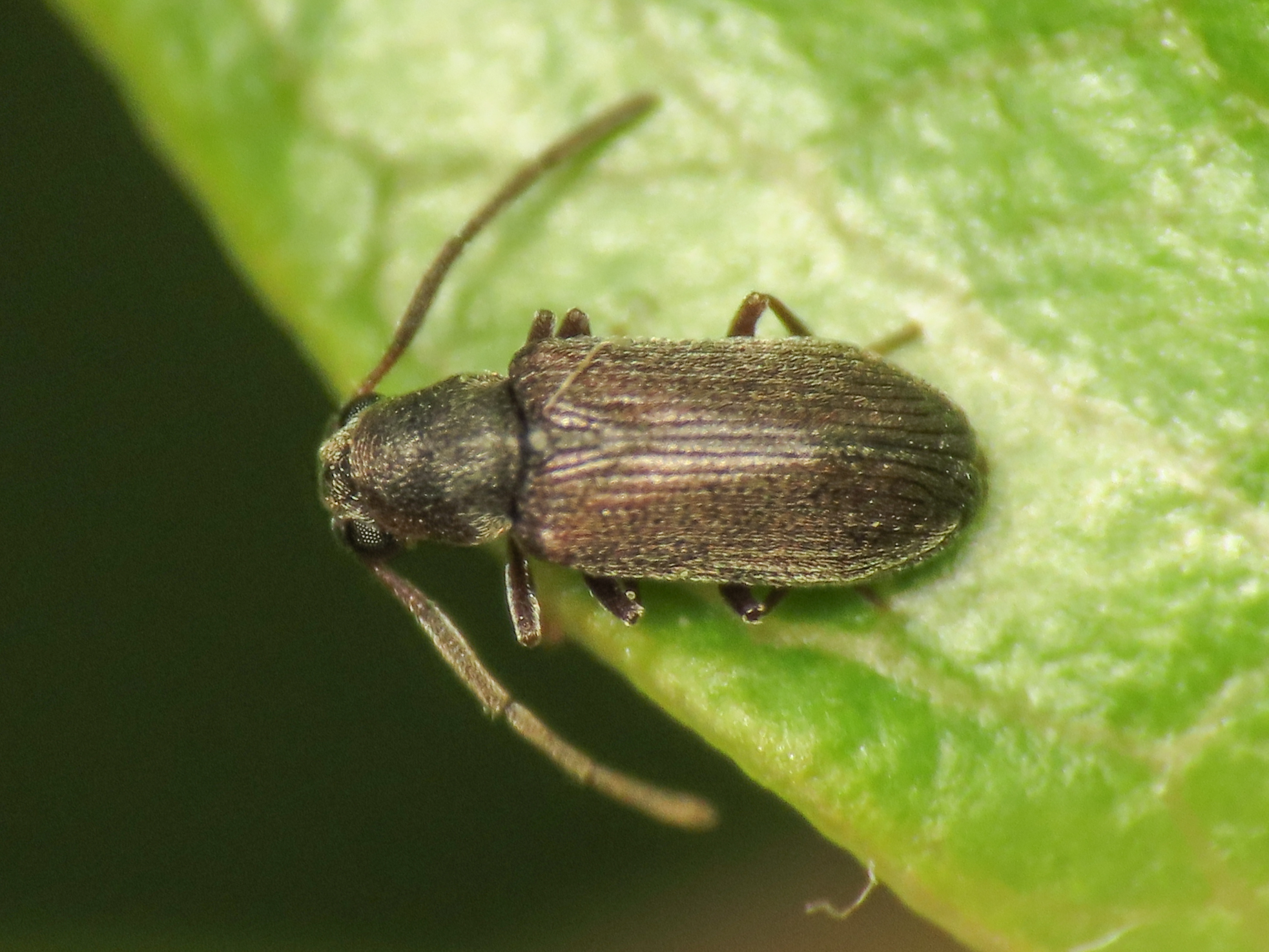

Scientific classification
- Kingdom: Animalia
- Phylum: Arthropoda
- Class: Insecta
- Order: Coleoptera
- Suborder: Polyphaga
- Family: Ptinidae
- Genus: Dryophilus
- Species: D. anobioides

Binomial name
- Dryophilus anobioides Chevrolat, 1832

= Dryophilus anobioides =

Species of beetle

Dryophilus anobioides is a species of beetle in the family Ptinidae.
