= Euserica alonsoi =

Scientific classification
- Kingdom: Animalia
- Phylum: Arthropoda
- Class: Insecta
- Order: Coleoptera
- Suborder: Polyphaga
- Infraorder: Scarabaeiformia
- Family: Scarabaeidae
- Genus: Euserica
- Species: E. alonsoi

Binomial name
- Euserica alonsoi Ruiz & Ávila, 1993

Species of beetle

Euserica alonsoi is a species of beetle of the family Scarabaeidae. It is found in Morocco.

== Description ==
Adults reach a length of about 8.4 mm. The general colouration of the body is light brown. The sides of the pronotum and elytra, elytral apex, legs and ventral surface are lighter.

== Etymology ==
The species is named after Dr. D. Miguel Angel Alonso Zarazaga.
