= Dolomittøyane =

Island group in Svalbard, Norway

Coordinates: 79.8017°N 18.3475°E

Dolomittøyane is a group of islands in Hinlopen Strait, Svalbard. They are located about five nautical miles south of the headland of Sparreneset, and extend over a length of about three miles, curving towards the spit of Gimleodden.
