= Johan Nordenfalk =

Swedish politician

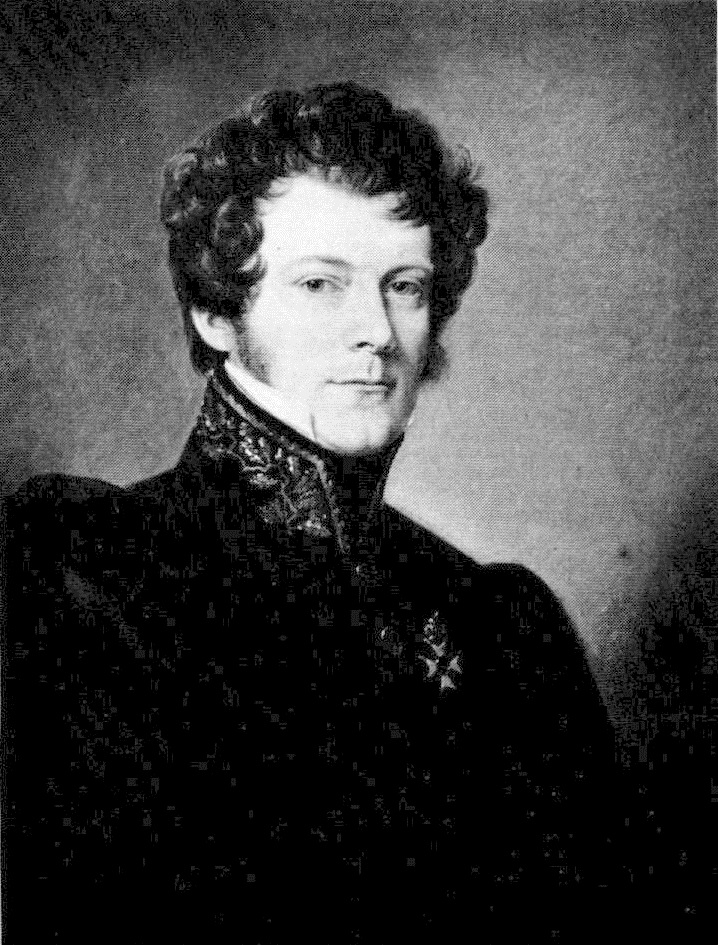

Prime Minister for Justice
- In office 28 December 1844 – 9 March 1846
- Monarch: Oscar I
- Preceded by: Lars Herman Gyllenhaal
- Succeeded by: Arvid Mauritz Posse

Personal details
- Born: 9 September 1796; Överlännäs, Holms säteri, Västernorrland County
- Died: 9 March 1846 (aged 49); Stockholm, Stockholm County
- Political party: None
- Spouse: Maria Risellschiöld

Johan Nordenfalk (9 September 1796 – 9 March 1846) was a Swedish friherre, public servant, and politician who served as Prime Minister for Justice from 1844 until his death in 1846.

== Biography ==
Nordenfalk was born into wealthy family of landowners as the son of Carl Fredrik Nordenfalk and Hedvig Sofia Hjärne. He received his education at Uppsala University, obtaining a degree in law and came to work as an assessor at the Svea Court of Appeal. Upon the death of his father in 1825, he inherited the family estate and large portions of agricultural land in Ångermanland. Through his marriage the Blekhem manor in Småland also came under his possession.

Between 1828 and 1831, Nordenfalk was a member of the Estates of the realm. He resigned from his post after coming into conflict with conservative fractions in the diet, among them count Magnus Brahe. After his resignation Nordenfalk returned to his estates, spending much time and investment in agricultural projects.

In 1838, Nordenfalk was raised to the noble rank of friherre.

After the death of king Charles XIV John he became minister without portfolio in the new government and was appointed Prime Minister for Justice later the same year.

Nordenfalk died in 1846 following a brief illness.

Preceded by Lars Herman Gyllenhaal	Prime Minister for Justice; 1844–1846	Succeeded by Arvid Mauritz Posse
