= Stephen Gyllenhaal =

American film director

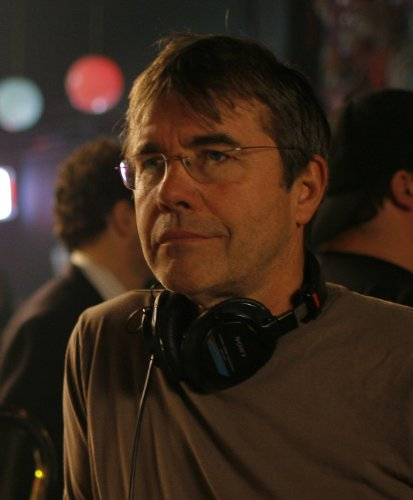
- Gyllenhaal in 2010
- Born: Stephen Roark Gyllenhaal; October 4, 1949 (age 77); Cleveland, Ohio, U.S.
- Education: Trinity College
- Occupations: Film director; TV director; poet
- Years active: 1979–present
- Spouses: Naomi Foner (m. 1977; div. 2009) Kathleen Man (m. 2011)
- Children: 3, including Maggie and Jake
- Family: Gyllenhaal
- Website: stephenrgyllenhaal.com

Stephen Roark Gyllenhaal (/ˈdʒɪlənhɔːl/ JIL-ən-hawl, Swedish: [ˈjʏ̂lːɛnˌhɑːl]; born October 4, 1949) is an American film director and poet. He is the father of actors Jake and Maggie Gyllenhaal.

== Early life ==
Stephen Roark Gyllenhaal was born in Cleveland, Ohio, to Hugh Anders Gyllenhaal and Virginia Lowrie (née Childs). He is of Swedish and English descent; through his father, he is a descendant of the cavalry officer Nils Gunnesson Haal, who was ennobled by Queen Christina of Sweden in 1652 and given the family name "Gyllenhaal".

Gyllenhaal grew up in Bryn Athyn, a suburb of Philadelphia, in a close-knit Swedenborgian family. He graduated from Trinity College in Hartford, Connecticut, in 1972, with a degree in English. His mentor at Trinity was the poet Hugh Ogden.

== Career ==
Gyllenhaal directed the film version of the Pete Dexter novel Paris Trout, which was nominated for five Emmy Awards and won him a DGA Award. In 1990, Gyllenhaal directed Family of Spies, which was nominated for two Golden Globe Awards and an Emmy. In 1992, he directed the feature film Waterland, starring Jeremy Irons and Ethan Hawke. Since 1993, he has focused primarily on directing in television, including an episode of the ABC television series Twin Peaks. He directed his son, Jake, then 13 years old, in an episode of NBC's Homicide: Life on the Street that aired in 1994. Gyllenhaal directed several episodes of the CBS series Numb3rs, The Mentalist, Hawthorne, Army Wives, Rectify, and Blue Bloods. In 2011, Gyllenhaal directed Girl Fight which starred Anne Heche and earned Gyllenhaal a nomination for Directors Guild of America Award for Outstanding Directing – Miniseries or TV Film.

He is also a poet, and has been published in literary journals such as Prairie Schooner and Nimrod. His first collection of poetry, Claptrap: Notes from Hollywood, was published in June 2006 by Cantara Christopher's New York–based literary small press, Cantarabooks.

In 2013, Gyllenhaal directed a backdoor pilot originally titled Sworn to Silence that aired as the Lifetime TV movie An Amish Murder. It stars Neve Campbell as a local police detective who must solve a murder case that involves the Amish Community she was shunned from years ago. Gyllenhaal is also in post-production on a documentary about dream interpretation titled Exquisite Continent.

In 2019, Gyllenhaal was on the "Social Impact Advisory Board" of the San Diego International Film Festival with Susan Sarandon and Cecilia Peck.

== Personal life ==
Gyllenhaal was married to screenwriter Naomi Foner Gyllenhaal for 32 years, from 1977 until their divorce was finalized in 2009. Together, they are the parents of actress Maggie and actor Jake Gyllenhaal.

In July 2011, he married Kathleen Man, a filmmaker and professor who was a co-producer on Gyllenhaal's 2012 film Grassroots. Their son Luke was born in 2014.

His brother, Anders Gyllenhaal, is executive editor of the Miami Herald.

== Selected filmography ==
Year	Title	Notes
1979	Exit 10	
1985	Certain Fury	
1990	A Killing in a Small Town	TV film; Nominated - Primetime Emmy Award for Outstanding Directing for a Miniseries, Movie or a Dramatic Special
1990	Family of Spies	TV
1991	Twin Peaks	TV; "The Path to the Black Lodge"
1991	Paris Trout	TV
1992	Waterland	
1993	A Dangerous Woman	
1995	Losing Isaiah	
1998	Homegrown	
1999	Resurrection	TV
2000	The $treet	
2001	The Warden of Red Rock	TV
2002	Living with the Dead	TV
2006	Time Bomb	TV
2007	Manchild	TV
2010	The Mentalist	TV
2011	Girl Fight	TV
2012	NYC 22	TV
2012	Grassroots	
2013	An Amish Murder	TV
2014	Rectify	TV
2016	So B. It	
2016	Billions	TV
2023	UnCharitable	Documentary Film
