= Euserica villarreali =

Scientific classification
- Kingdom: Animalia
- Phylum: Arthropoda
- Class: Insecta
- Order: Coleoptera
- Suborder: Polyphaga
- Infraorder: Scarabaeiformia
- Family: Scarabaeidae
- Genus: Euserica
- Species: E. villarreali

Binomial name
- Euserica villarreali Baraud, 1975

Species of beetle

Euserica villarreali is a species of beetle of the family Scarabaeidae. It is found in Spain.

== Description ==
Adults reach a length of about 7 mm. They are uniformly light reddish-brown, with only the antennae light testaceous. The punctuation on the pronotum is fairly strong and dense, especially on the sides. The elytra has medium, simple, dense punctation, especially concentrated on the striae. The interstriae are slightly raised and smooth in their middle.
