= Frederick William von Hessenstein =

Field Marshal of Sweden (1735–1808)

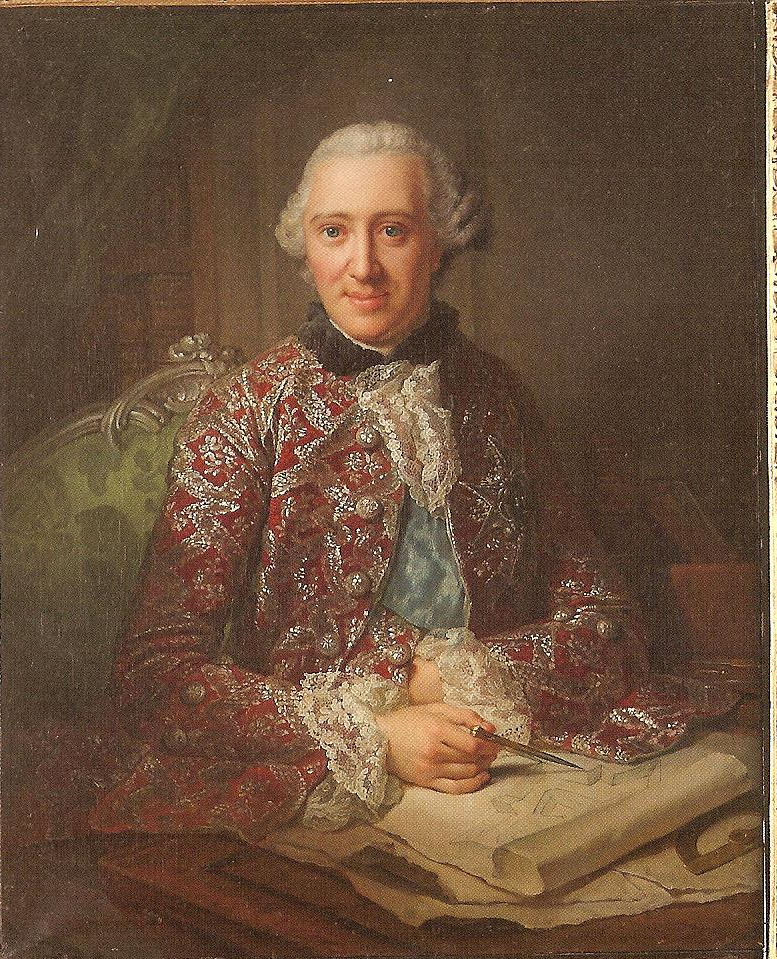
Frederick William von Hessenstein

Frederick William, Prince von Hessenstein (17 March 1735, Stockholm — 27 July 1808, Panker), was a Swedish statesman and a soldier of German ancestry.

== Biography ==
He was the eldest extramarital son of King Frederick I of Sweden, member of the House of Hesse, and his royal mistress Hedvig Ulrika Taube.

King Gustav III treated him with great respect. He was appointed Field Marshal in 1773, Privy Councillor in 1776, and Governor-General of Pomerania between 1776 and 1791. Hessenstein was made a count of the Holy Roman Empire (in which his father's German realm, the landgraviate of Hesse-Kassel, was located) on 28 February 1741, and created a Swedish count on 29 March of the following year. He was elevated to Prince von Hessenstein in the Empire in November 1772, and hereditary Prince von Hessenstein also in Sweden on 28 April 1785. In 1773, he was also made the first of the Lords of the Realm.

According to unverified rumors, he might have been the father of an extramarital daughter by Princess Sofia Albertina, Gustav III's sister. Named Sophia, she was allegedly born in 1786, a year before the princess was sent to Germany as Abbess of Quedlinburg.

== Honors ==
- Knight of the Royal Order of the Seraphim
- Commander of the Royal Order of the Sword

== Other sources ==
- Lindquist, Herman (2002) Historien om Sverige. Gustavs dagar (Norstedts Förlag) ISBN 978-91-1-301455-5)
- Lagerqvist, Lars O. (1976) Sveriges regenter - från forntid till nutid (Bonnier) ISBN 978-91-0-041538-9
