= Euserica mulsanti =

Scientific classification
- Kingdom: Animalia
- Phylum: Arthropoda
- Class: Insecta
- Order: Coleoptera
- Suborder: Polyphaga
- Infraorder: Scarabaeiformia
- Family: Scarabaeidae
- Genus: Euserica
- Species: E. mulsanti

Binomial name
- Euserica mulsanti (Brenske, 1902)

Synonyms
- Serica mulsanti Brenske, 1902; Serica ariasi Brenske, 1898

Species of beetle

Euserica mulsanti is a species of beetle of the family Scarabaeidae. It is found in Portugal and Spain.

== Description ==
Adults reach a length of about 5–6 mm. The upper surface ranges from reddish-brown to blackish-brown, with the antennae and palps light yellow and the underside lighter. They are slightly glossy.
