= Euserica segurana =

Scientific classification
- Kingdom: Animalia
- Phylum: Arthropoda
- Class: Insecta
- Order: Coleoptera
- Suborder: Polyphaga
- Infraorder: Scarabaeiformia
- Family: Scarabaeidae
- Genus: Euserica
- Species: E. segurana

Binomial name
- Euserica segurana (Brenske, 1898)

Synonyms
- Serica segurana Brenske, 1898; Euserica pauliani López-Colón, 1988

Species of beetle

Euserica segurana is a species of beetle of the family Scarabaeidae. It is found in Spain.

== Description ==
Adults reach a length of about 7–8 mm. The upper surface ranges from dark brown to black, except for the light yellowish-brown antennae and palps, and the tibiae, which are slightly lighter and reddish. The underside is lighter reddish-brown. They have a slightly glossy appearance.
