= Lagercrantz =

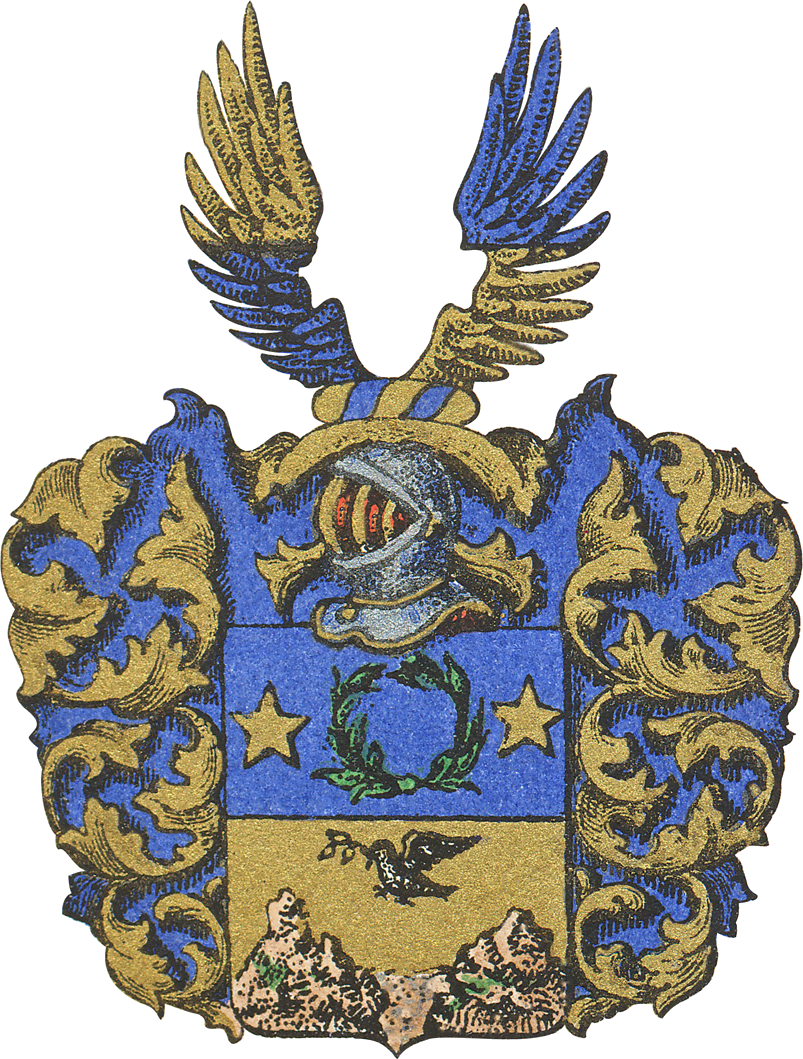
Coat of arms of Lagercrantz family

The Lagercrantz family is an influential Swedish noble family, whose members held various positions in Sweden and Finland.

== History ==
On 13 February 1682 he family was ennobled with the name Lagercrantz. On 6 October 1682 the family was introduced to the House of Nobility. The current head of the family is Carl Lagercrantz (born 1935).

== Notable members ==
- Ava de Lagercrantz (1862–1938), Swedish portrait artist
- Bengt Lagercrantz (1887–1924), Swedish sport shooter
- Bror Lagercrantz (1894–1981), Swedish fencer
- David Lagercrantz (born 1962), Swedish journalist and author
- Floyd Lagercrantz (1915–1977), Swedish footballer
- Hugo Lagercrantz (born 1945), Swedish paediatrician
- Marika Lagercrantz (born 1954), Swedish actress
- Olof Lagercrantz (1911–2002), Swedish writer and critic
- Otto Lagercrantz (1868–1938), Swedish linguist
- Rose Lagercrantz (born 1947), Swedish author

== See also ==
- Lagercrantz family
