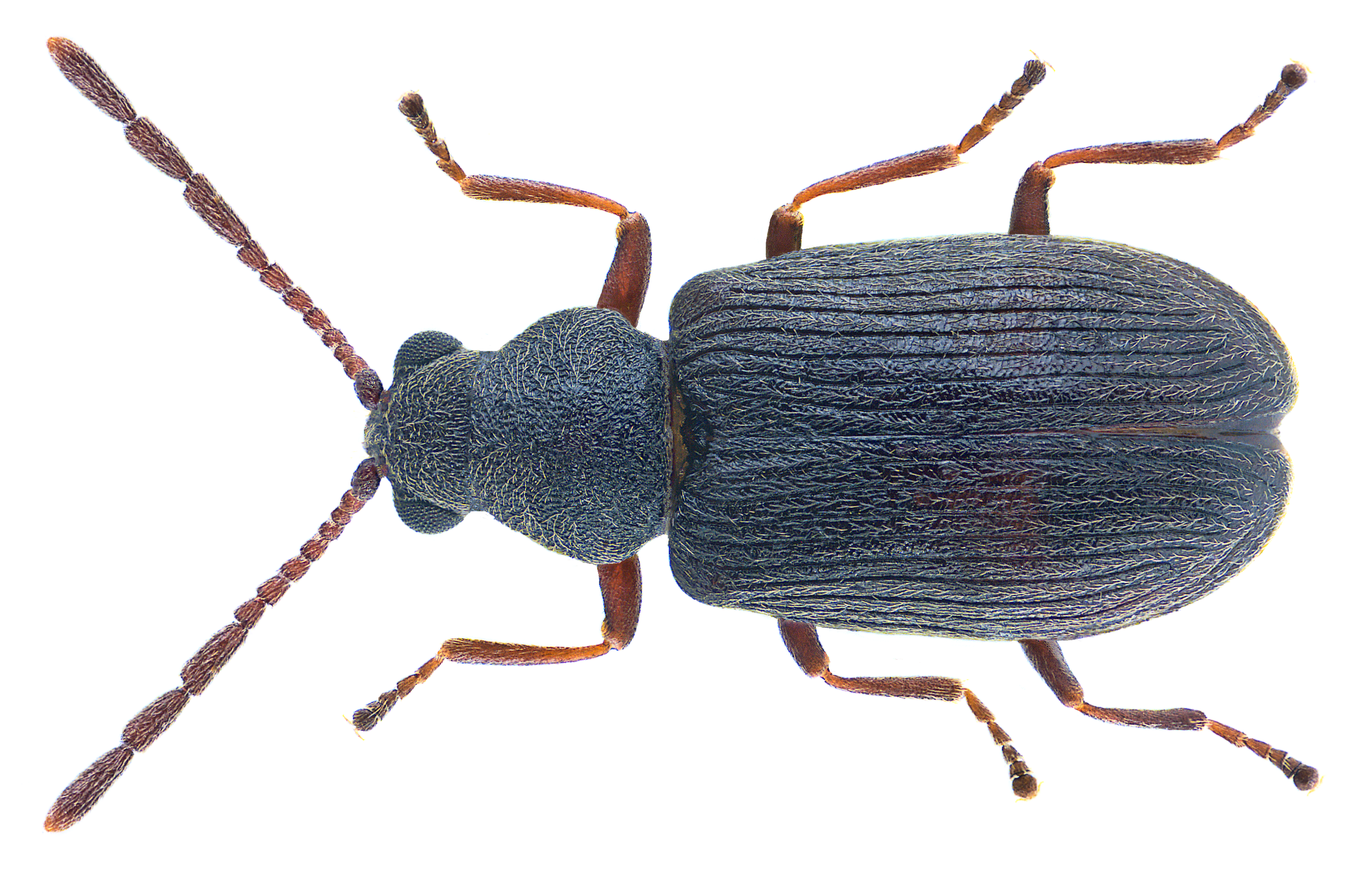
- Dryophilus pusillus (Gyllenhal, 1808), Female

Scientific classification
- Kingdom: Animalia
- Phylum: Arthropoda
- Class: Insecta
- Order: Coleoptera
- Suborder: Polyphaga
- Family: Ptinidae
- Tribe: Dryophilini
- Genus: Dryophilus; Chevrolat, 1832

= Dryophilus =

Genus of beetles

Dryophilus is a genus of beetles in the family Ptinidae. There are about eight described species in Dryophilus.

== Species ==
These species belong to the genus Dryophilus:

- Dryophilus anobioides Chevrolat, 1832^{g}
- Dryophilus densipilis Abeille de Perrin, 1872^{g}
- Dryophilus forticornis Abeille de Perrin, 1875^{g}
- Dryophilus longicollis (Mulsant & Rey, 1853)^{g}
- Dryophilus luigionii Pic, 1921^{g}
- Dryophilus pusillus (Gyllenhal, 1808)
- Dryophilus rufescens Pic, 1921^{g}
- Dryophilus siculus Ragusa, 1896^{g}

Data sources: i = ITIS, c = Catalogue of Life, g = GBIF, b = Bugguide.net
