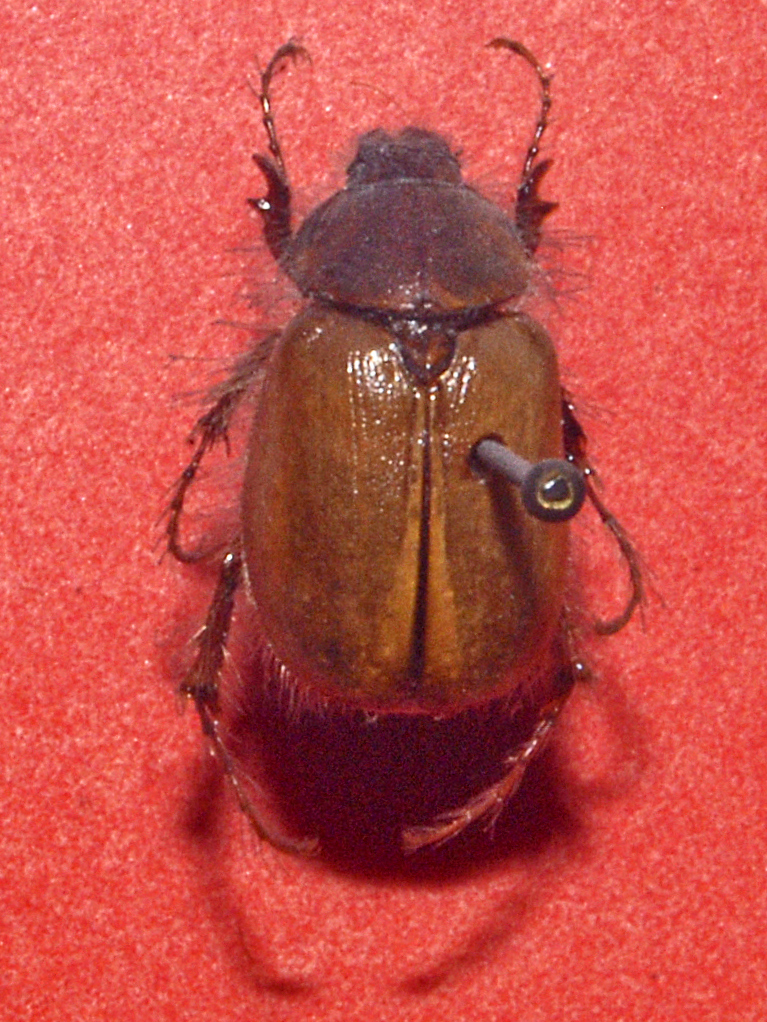
- Elaphocera emarginata

Scientific classification
- Kingdom: Animalia
- Phylum: Arthropoda
- Class: Insecta
- Order: Coleoptera
- Suborder: Polyphaga
- Infraorder: Scarabaeiformia
- Family: Scarabaeidae
- Tribe: Tanyproctini
- Genus: Elaphocera; Géné, 1836

Synonyms
- Leptopus Waltl, 1838 (Homonym)

= Elaphocera =

Genus of beetles

Elaphocera is a genus of scarab beetles belonging to the subfamily Melolonthinae.

== Species ==
Species within this genus include:

- Elaphocera affinis
- Elaphocera alonsoi
- Elaphocera ampla
- Elaphocera angusta
- Elaphocera aristidis
- Elaphocera autumnalis
- Elaphocera baguenae
- Elaphocera barbara
- Elaphocera cacerensis
- Elaphocera capdeboni
- Elaphocera carteiensis
- Elaphocera christina
- Elaphocera churianensis
- Elaphocera cretica
- Elaphocera dalmatina
- Elaphocera denticornis
- Elaphocera elongata
- Elaphocera emarginata
- Elaphocera erberi
- Elaphocera erichsoni
- Elaphocera ferreri
- Elaphocera gibbifrons
- Elaphocera gracilis
- Elaphocera heydeni
- Elaphocera hiemalis
- Elaphocera hirticollis
- Elaphocera hispalensis
- Elaphocera ibicensis
- Elaphocera insularis
- Elaphocera kosensis
- Elaphocera lajonquierei
- Elaphocera martini
- Elaphocera martorellii
- Elaphocera nigroflabellata
- Elaphocera nupcialis
- Elaphocera ochsi
- Elaphocera perezlopezi
- Elaphocera phungae
- Elaphocera roessneri
- Elaphocera schmidti
- Elaphocera segurensis
- Elaphocera staudingeri
- Elaphocera sulcatula
- Elaphocera suturalis
- Elaphocera syriaca
- Elaphocera tethys
