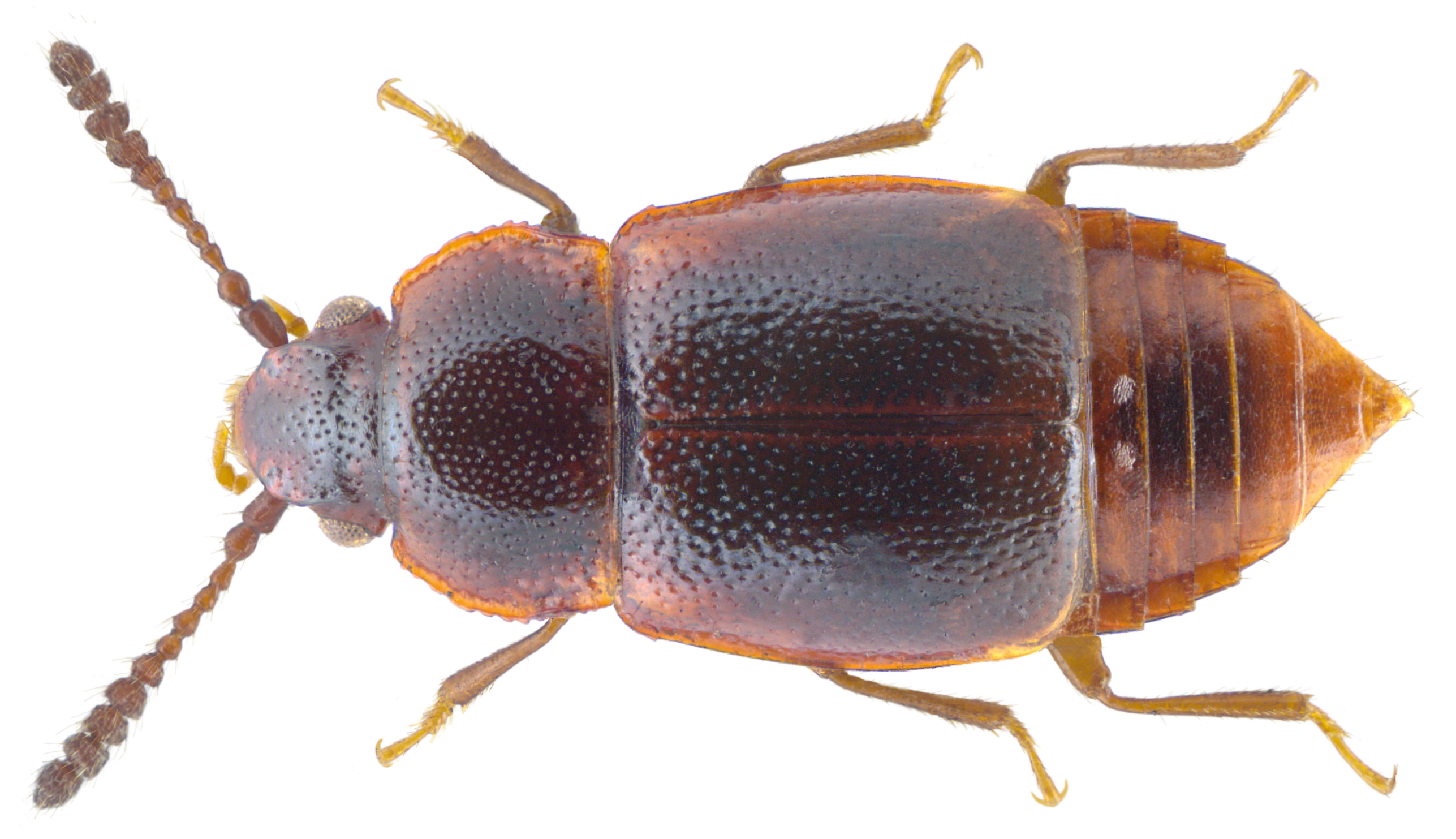
- Acrulia inflata

Scientific classification
- Kingdom: Animalia
- Phylum: Arthropoda
- Class: Insecta
- Order: Coleoptera
- Suborder: Polyphaga
- Infraorder: Staphyliniformia
- Family: Staphylinidae
- Genus: Acrulia; Thomson, 1858

= Acrulia =

Genus of beetles

Acrulia is a genus of beetles belonging to the family Staphylinidae.

The genus was first described by Thomson in 1858.

The species of this genus are found in Europe and Northern America.

Extant species:

- Acrulia angusticollis Reitter, 1909
- Acrulia inflata Gyllenhal, 1813

Extinct species:

- †Acrulia danica Shavrin, 2023
