= Blekhem =

Coordinates: 57°49′21″N 16°25′40″E

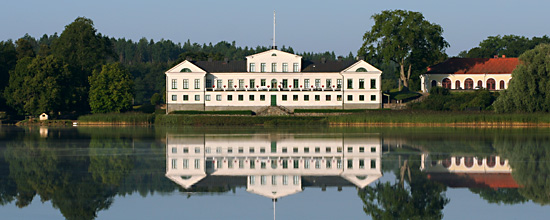
Blekhem

Blekhem is a manor house in Västervik Municipality, Sweden.

The history of the estate goes back to the 14th century. It was owned by the Soop family until 1562, when it was sold to King Eric XIV. It remained a royal estate until 1612, when Johan Skytte acquired it from the Crown. It has thereafter belonged to various Swedish aristocratic and other families, e.g. Gyllenstierna, Posse, Lewenhaupt and Hamilton. The present main building was built in 1838-42 during the ownership of baron Johan Nordenfalk. It is still owned by the Nordenfalk family.
