= Euserica mamorensis =

Scientific classification
- Kingdom: Animalia
- Phylum: Arthropoda
- Class: Insecta
- Order: Coleoptera
- Suborder: Polyphaga
- Infraorder: Scarabaeiformia
- Family: Scarabaeidae
- Genus: Euserica
- Species: E. mamorensis

Binomial name
- Euserica mamorensis Baraud, 1965

Species of beetle

Euserica mamorensis is a species of beetle of the family Scarabaeidae. It is found in Morocco.

== Description ==
Adults reach a length of about 8 mm. The upper surface is reddish-brown or blackish-brown, while the under surface and the legs are lighter. The antennae and palps are yellow. They have a glossy appearance.
