= Euserica cambeloi =

Scientific classification
- Kingdom: Animalia
- Phylum: Arthropoda
- Class: Insecta
- Order: Coleoptera
- Suborder: Polyphaga
- Infraorder: Scarabaeiformia
- Family: Scarabaeidae
- Genus: Euserica
- Species: E. cambeloi

Binomial name
- Euserica cambeloi Ruiz & Ávila, 1993

Species of beetle

Euserica cambeloi is a species of beetle of the family Scarabaeidae. It is found in Ceuta.

== Description ==
Adults reach a length of about 8.3 mm. The general colouration of the body is not very dark brown, more or less uniform dorsally, while the sides of the pronotum and elytra, legs and ventral surface are somewhat lighter.

== Etymology ==
The species is named after D. Antonio Jose Cambelo.
