= Lars Herman Gyllenhaal =

Swedish politician (1790–1858)

His Excellency The High Well-born Baron Lars Herman Gyllenhaal Lord of the Realm RoKKMO
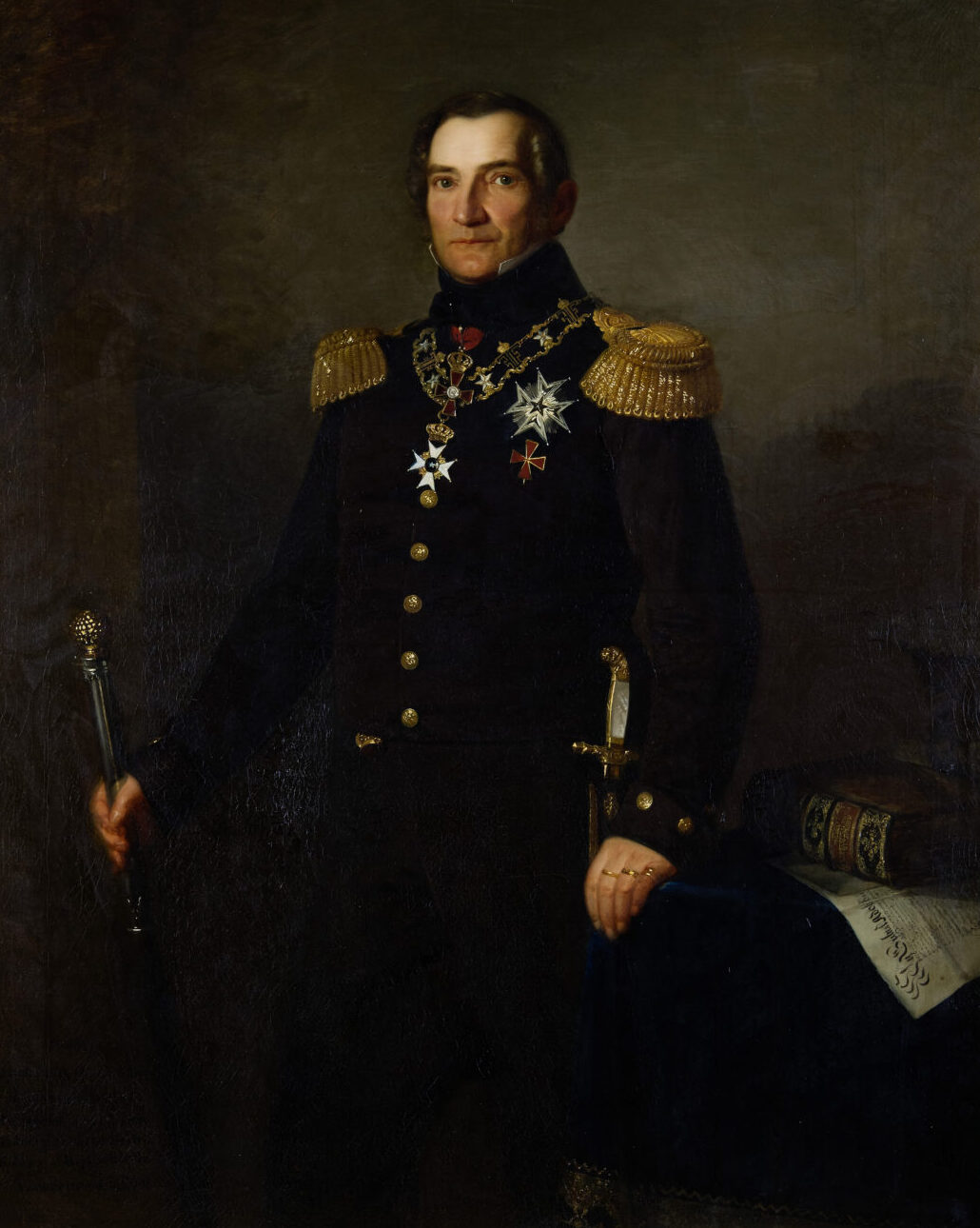

6th Prime Minister for Justice
- In office 5 January 1843 – 28 December 1844
- Monarch: Charles XIV John
- Preceded by: Carl Petter Törnebladh
- Succeeded by: Johan Nordenfalk

Personal details
- Born: Lars Herman Gyllenhaal; 20 March 1790 Härlingstorp, Vings socken, Sweden
- Died: 22 December 1858 (aged 68) Härlingstorp, Vings socken, Sweden
- Party: None
- Relatives: Gyllenhaal family
- Occupation: Statesman

Baron Lars Herman Gyllenhaal (20 March 1790 – 28 December 1858) was a Swedish friherre, public servant, and statesman who served as Prime Minister for Justice from 1843 to 1844.

== Early life ==
Born into the Swedish noble Gyllenhaal family, as the fourth child and only son of Lorentz Herman Gyllenhaal (1757–1830) and his wife, Baroness Hedvig Margareta Leuhusen (1763–1857), daughter of Baron Carl Leuhausen (1724–1795) and Juliana Margareta Nordencrantz (1743–1769).

== Career ==
Gyllenhaal was "president," in the Göta Court of Appeals 1836–1855, Prime Minister for Justice 1843–1844. Again chief justice in the Göta court of appeal from 28 December 1844 to 3 April 1855. Speaker (lantmarskalk) in the Estate of the Nobility in the Riksdag 1850–1851. HedLLA 43 (Honorary Member of the Agriculture Academy 1843) RoKKMO 51 (Knight and Commander of the Orders of His Majesty the King 1851).

== Personal life ==
He married firstly Henrika Lovisa Ulrika Tham (1791–1816), daughter of Casper Tham (1750–1805) and his wife, Baroness Elisabeth Albertina Margareta von Knorring (1765–1802), both of descending from German nobility. After the death of his first wife, he married secondly Elisabet Sofia Palm (1795–1865), daughter of Jakob Svensson Palm (1748–1821) and Margareta Christina Lidman (1758–1815). He had issue from both marriages.

== See also ==
- Gyllenhaal family

Regnal titles
New title	Baron Gyllenhaal af Härlingstorp; 1837–1858	Succeeded by Lars Herman Gyllenhaal
