= Kathleen Man Gyllenhaal =

American film director (born 1974)

- Born: Kathleen Kwai Ching Man; 1974 (age 51–52); Oahu, Hawaii, U.S.
- Education: Punahou School; Yale University (BA); University of Iowa (MFA)
- Occupation: Filmmaker
- Years active: 2000–present
- Spouse: Stephen Gyllenhaal (m. 2011)
- Children: 1

Kathleen Man Gyllenhaal (born Kathleen Kwai Ching Man; 1974) is an American filmmaker from Hawaii.

== Education ==
Man Gyllenhaal graduated from Yale University with a Bachelor of Arts degree in film studies and received her Master of Fine Arts from the University of Iowa. Man Gyllenhaal was awarded a Fulbright Scholarship in Paris, France where she directed an award-winning short film titled L'Entretien (The Interview). Man Gyllenhaal then served as a professor at Vassar College where she was awarded tenure. While at the college, Man Gyllenhaal directed a short film as a collaboration with her students titled, Walk the Fish.

== Personal life ==
Man Gyllenhaal was born on the island of Oahu in Hawaii. There, she attended high school at the Punahou School, graduating in 1992. In July 2011 Gyllenhaal married Stephen Gyllenhaal, a director/producer who is the father of actors Jake and Maggie Gyllenhaal. The ceremony was held on her home island of Oahu. Their son Luke was born in 2014. The pair have collaborated on projects such as the film Grassroots which starred Jason Biggs and Joel David Moore.

== Career ==
Man Gyllenhaal has directed many award-winning shorts including Sita: A Girl From Jambu which explores sex trafficking in Nepal and Lychee Thieves a short film where Man Gyllenhaal represented her native Hawaii. Sita: A Girl From Jambu was used at benefit screenings to raise awareness and funds for the prevention of sex trafficking in Nepal. The film is based on Bichari (Poor) Sita, a play that was written and performed by native girls in rural Nepal. Man Gyllenhaal produced Kind of a Blur which starred Sandra Oh.

Man Gyllenhaal also co-directed the award-winning feature-length documentary, Beauty Mark. The film tells the story of runner, Diane Israel, and her struggle with an eating disorder.

Man Gyllenhaal served as a co-producer of Grassroots and is the producer of Uncharitable, based on the viral TED Talk "The Way We Think About Charity is Dead Wrong" by Dan Pallotta.

Man Gyllenhaal is also the writer/director of In Utero, a feature documentary about prenatal life and its impact on human development, which premiered at the Seattle International Film Festival in 2015 and won a Social Impact Media Award (SIMA) and the Breakthrough Documentary Award at the San Diego International Film Festival. Man Gyllenhaal was pregnant herself during filming.
