= Gustaf Adolf Vive Sparre =

Swedish politician (1802–1886)

Count Gustaf Adolf Vive Sparre
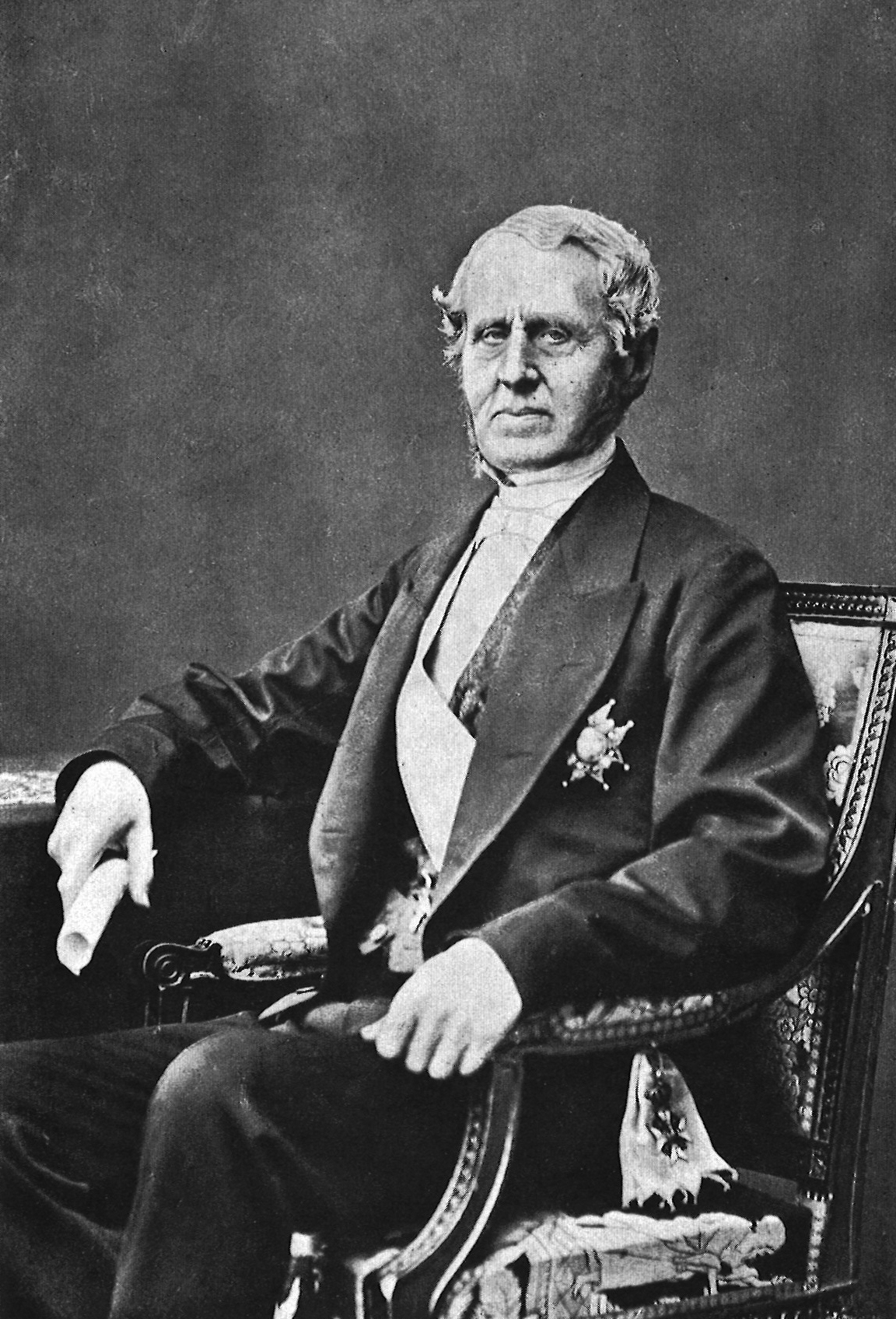

9th Prime Minister for Justice
- In office 10 April 1848 – 25 September 1856
- Monarch: Oscar I
- Preceded by: Arvid Mauritz Posse
- Succeeded by: Claës Günther

Marshal of the Realm
- In office 1864 – 1886
- Preceded by: Nils Gyldenstolpe
- Succeeded by: Gillis Bildt

Personal details
- Born: 4 September 1802 Trolleholm Castle in Scania
- Died: 26 April 1886 (aged 83) Stockholm
- Education: Uppsala University

Gustaf Adolf Vive Sparre af Söfdeborg (4 September 1802 – 26 April 1886) was a Swedish statesman and jurist who served as Prime Minister for Justice from 1848 to 1856. Following his premiership, Sparre served as Marshal of the Realm. He initially represented Swedish nobility in the Riksdag of the Estates from 1828 to 1866, and later Kopparberg in the bicameral Riksdag from 1867 to 1875.

== Biography ==
Sparre was born in 1802 into the comital af Söfdeborg branch of the House of Sparre. He enrolled at Uppsala University in 1816 and graduated in 1823, after which he began his career as a jurist.

In 1848 Sparre was chosen as Prime Minister for Justice, and had to deal with the Revolutions of 1848 as well as the reactionary response in the subsequent years. He resigned in 1856 and became President of the Svea Court of Appeal instead. Sparre also served as Chancellor of both Universities between 1856 and 1867, and was Marshal of the Realm from 1864 until his death.

He was a member of the Riksdag of the Estates between 1834 and 1866, and was between 1867 and 1875 member of the First Chamber for Kopparberg County. He was also a member of several academies and societies, such as the Guild of the Order of the Seraphim (chairman, 1858). the Academy of Sciences (1855), the Academy of Letters, History and Antiquities (honorary, 1848), the Society of Sciences in Uppsala (1848), the Academy of Agriculture (1853), and the Physiographic Society in Lund (1860).

Sparre had no strong political convictions of his own but loyally assisted King Oscar I in aligning national policy in a more conservative direction. He was highly interested in the humanities, especially genealogy.

A headland of Svalbard, Sparreneset, is named after him.

== Orders and decorations ==
- Knight and Commander of the Orders of His Majesty (Order of the Seraphim)
- Grand Cross of the Order of S:t Olav
- Knight of the Order of the Elephant

Preceded by Arvid Mauritz Posse	Prime Minister for Justice; 1848–1856	Succeeded by Claës Günther
