= Euserica alcaidei =

Scientific classification
- Kingdom: Animalia
- Phylum: Arthropoda
- Class: Insecta
- Order: Coleoptera
- Suborder: Polyphaga
- Infraorder: Scarabaeiformia
- Family: Scarabaeidae
- Genus: Euserica
- Species: E. alcaidei

Binomial name
- Euserica alcaidei Baraud, 1965

Species of beetle

Euserica alcaidei is a species of beetle of the family Scarabaeidae. It is found in Morocco.

== Description ==
Adults reach a length of about 5–6 mm. The upper surface is brown, more or less reddish or, smetimes even blackish. The underside is lighter. The antennae and palps are light yellow. They have a glossy appearance.
