= Ava de Lagercrantz =

Swedish portrait painter

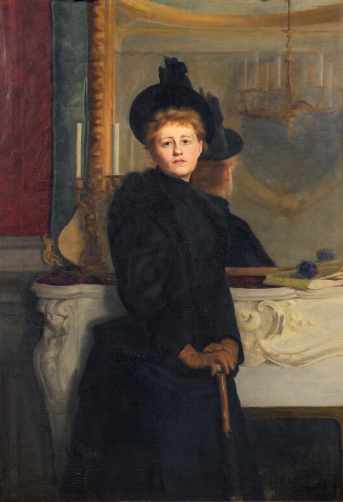
Self-portrait of Ava de Lagercrantz (1889)

Hedvig Gustava Lagercrantz (1862–1938), generally known as Ava de Lagercrantz, was a prominent Swedish portrait painter who was active in New York, Stockholm and Paris. A cousin of Sweden's envoy to Washington, Herman Lagercrantz, she prospered in New York from portrait commissions. She is also remembered for being called to paint the portraits of the Swedish kings Oscar II and Gustaf V. Several of her works are in the collection of the National Museum of Sweden.

== Early life and education ==
Born in Karlskrona on 7 September 1862, Hedvig Gustava Lagercrantz was the daughter of vice-admiral Jacob Reinhold Lagercrantz (1821–1898) and his wife Hedvig Ottilia née Lindström (1833–1907). She was raised in a family of five children.

Exhibiting a talent for painting from an early age, she studied both in Sweden and abroad, first at Kerstin Cardon's school in Stockholm. She then moved to Paris where in the mid-1880s she studied under Jules Lefebvre, Tony Robert-Fleury, Gustave Boulanger, and Benjamin Constant.

== Career ==
From 1888 she exhibited in Paris, presenting her self-portrait in 1889, considered to be one of her finest works. In 1890, she won first prize for a portrait of her father. In addition to portraits, she painted landscapes, still-life flower paintings and miniatures.

In 1902, Lagercrantz moved to New York where she remained until 1923. Thanks to her cousin, the Swedish envoy to Washington Herman Lagercrantz, she obtained commissions to paint the portraits of diplomatics and opera personalities. Enhancing her image by adding an aristocratic "de" to her name, she was included in the exclusive Woman's Who's Who of America (1915). In 1896, she had painted the portrait of King Oscar II. While in New York, in 1909 she was called back to Sweden to paint the portrait of his son, Gustav V. On her return in May 1909, details were reported in the New York Times.

On returning to Sweden in 1923, Lagercrantz settled in Stockholm where she held an exhibition at Konstnärshuset in 1935. She spent her final years in Paris where she died on 6 May 1938.
