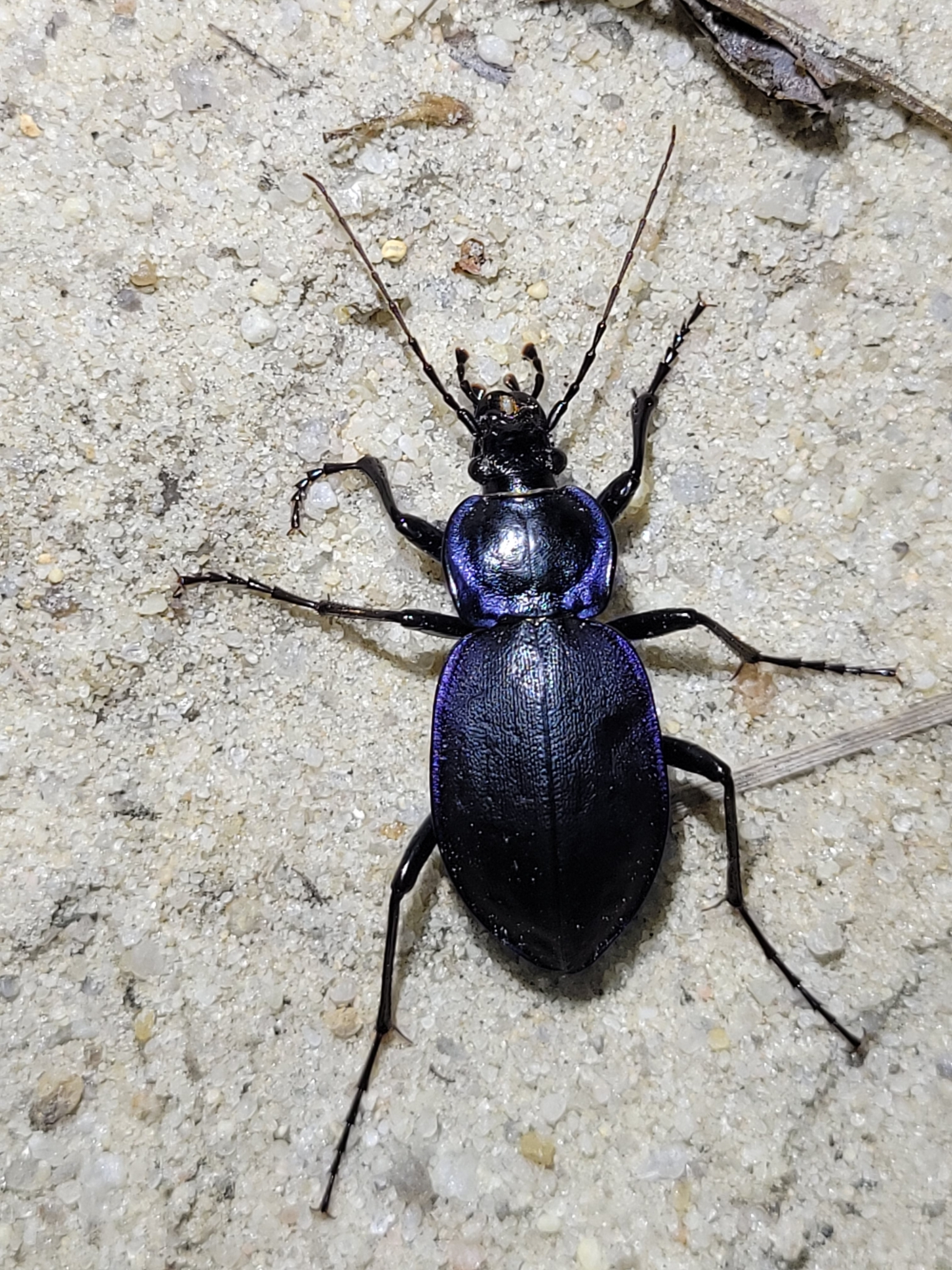

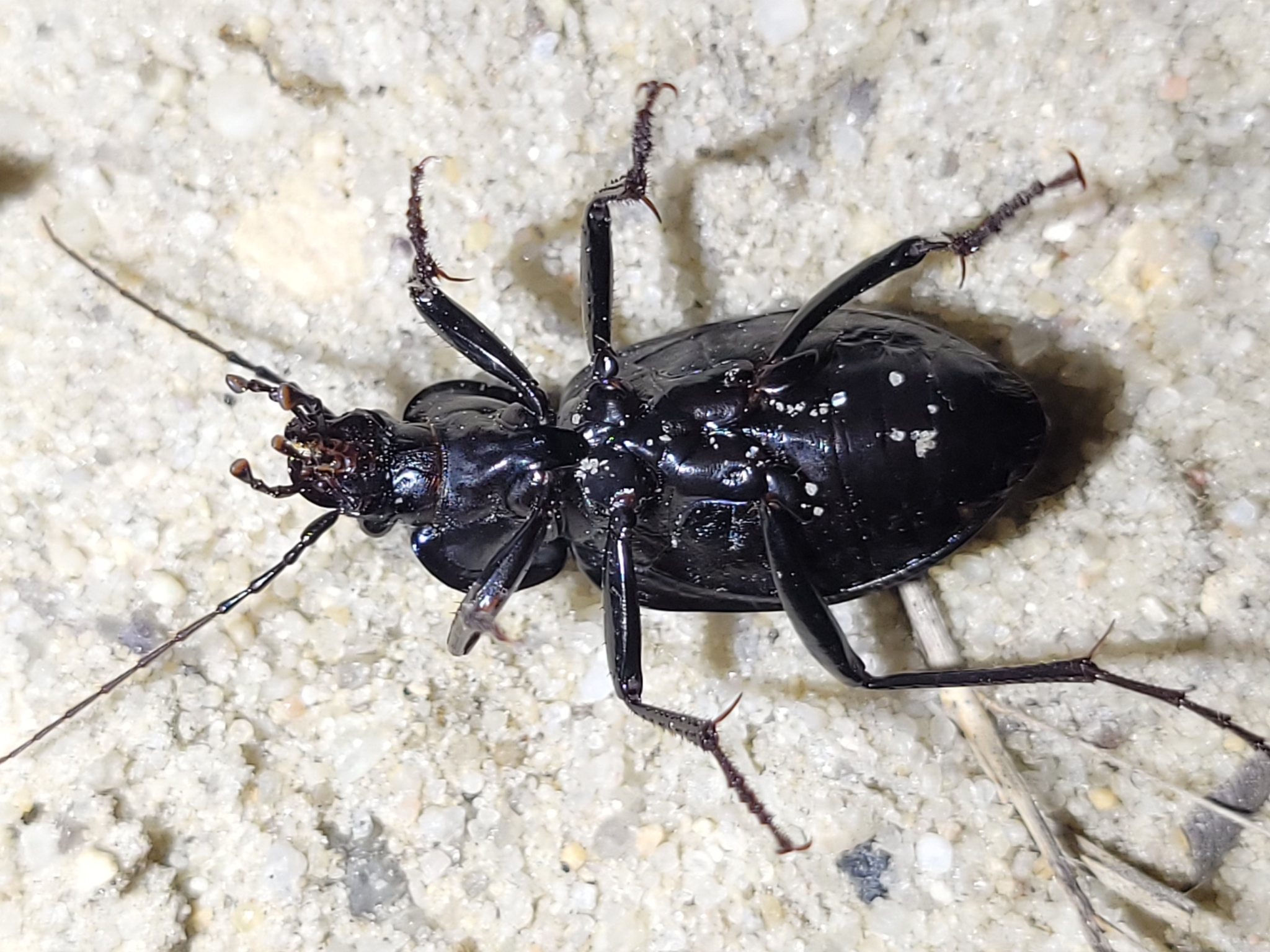

Scientific classification
- Kingdom: Animalia
- Phylum: Arthropoda
- Class: Insecta
- Order: Coleoptera
- Suborder: Adephaga
- Family: Carabidae
- Genus: Carabus
- Species: C. sylvosus

Binomial name
- Carabus sylvosus Say, 1823

Synonyms
- Carabus lherminieri Dejean, 1826

= Carabus sylvosus =

Species of beetle

Carabus sylvosus, the woodland ground beetle or silvan worm and slug hunter, is a species of ground beetle in the family Carabidae. It is found in North America, where it inhabits wooded areas, including deciduous mixed and coniferous forests, as well as orchards.

Adults are brachypterous and nocturnal. They prey on Lepidoptera pupae and scarabaeids.
