= List of members of the upper house of the Riksdag, 1891 =

This is a list of members of the upper house of the Swedish parliament in 1891.

== List of members of parliament ==
| Member of Parliament | Profession | Year of Birth | Constituency |
|---|---|---|---|
| Gustaf Rudolf Abelin | lieutenant general | 1819 | Östergötland County |
| Claes Adolf Adelsköld | former major | 1824 | Blekinge County |
| baron Gustaf Åkerhielm | prime minister | 1833 | Stockholm County |
| Lars Åkerhielm | minister | 1846 | Gothenburg and Bohus County |
| Oscar Alin | professor | 1846 | Uppsala County |
| August Almén | director-general | 1833 | Västerbotten County |
| Fredrik Almgren | överdirektör | 1840 | Norrbotten County |
| Oscar Almgren | wholesale dealer | 1842 | City of Stockholm |
| Robert Almström | manufacturer | 1834 | City of Stockholm |
| Frans Albert Anderson | director-general | 1831 | Västernorrland County |
| Gustaf Andersson | land tenure | 1840 | Östergötland County |
| Nils Andersson | farmer | 1845 | Kristianstad County |
| Per Johan Andersson | manufacturer | 1830 | Älvsborg County |
| Ludvig Annerstedt | former justice | 1836 | City of Stockholm |
| Fredrik Barnekow | land tenure | 1839 | Kristianstad County |
| Herman Behm | land tenure | 1842 | Örebro County |
| Carl Gottreich Beijer | director-general | 1811 | City of Malmö |
| Jöns Bengtsson i Hyllinge | farmer | 1820 | Malmöhus County |
| Axel Bennich | former generaltulldirektör | 1817 | Kalmar County Northern |
| Gustaf Berg | vogt | 1844 | Jönköping County |
| Lars Berg | county governor | 1838 | Norrbotten County |
| Oscar Bergius | vogt | 1834 | Malmöhus County |
| Carl Otto Bergman | lieutenant colonel | 1828 | Norrbotten County |
| Axel Bergström | county governor | 1823 | Örebro County |
| Niklas Biesèrt | bruksägare | 1831 | Jämtland County |
| Gillis Bildt | reichsmarschall, former prime minister | 1820 | City of Stockholm |
| Gottfrid Billing | bishop | 1841 | Västmanland County |
| Knut Björkenstam | vogt | 1815 | Västmanland County |
| Oscar Björnstjerna | major general | 1819 | City of Stockholm |
| Knut Bohnstedt | former ryttmästare | 1841 | Örebro County |
| Fredrik Theodor Borg | printer | 1824 | Malmöhus County |
| Filip Boström | ryttmästare | 1843 | Södermanland County |
| Wilhelm Brehmer | major | 1841 | Gävleborg County |
| Pontus af Burén | bruksägare | 1835 | Blekinge County |
| Fredrik Daniel Carlborg | vogt | 1834 | Gothenburg and Bohus County |
| Edvard Casparsson | former captain | 1827 | Uppsala County |
| Henrik Cavalli | landskamererare | 1852 | Malmöhus County |
| Axel Cederberg | byråingenjör | 1837 | Västerbotten County |
| Hjalmar Claëson | vogt | 1836 | Kopparberg County |
| Charles Dickson | physician, kirurgie magister | 1814 | City of Gothenburg |
| Ludvig Douglas | chamberlain | 1849 | Östergötland County |
| Casper Ehrenborg | ryttmästare | 1846 | Kristianstad County |
| Pehr von Ehrenheim | universitetskansler | 1823 | Uppsala County |
| Gustaf Ekdahl | handlare | 1835 | Stockholm County |
| Victor Ekenman | vogt | 1842 | Älvsborg County |
| Carl Edvard Ekman | bruksägare | 1826 | Östergötland County |
| Johan Eneroth | prosecutor | 1840 | Kristianstad County |
| Harald Ericsson | bruksägare | 1826 | Örebro County |
| Fredrik von Essen | minister | 1831 | Älvsborg County |
| baron Reinhold von Essen | land tenure | 1826 | Skaraborg County |
| Albert Evers | disponent | 1846 | Älvsborg County |
| Oskar Evers | director-general | 1833 | Gothenburg and Bohus County |
| Helmer Falk | colonel | 1829 | Värmland County |
| Wilhelm Falk | bruksägare | 1825 | Kopparberg County |
| Sixten Flach | tjänstgörande kabinettskammarherre | 1826 | Östergötland County |
| Nils Fock | former ryttmästare | 1825 | Skaraborg County |
| Hans Forssell | president | 1843 | Gävleborg County |
| Edvard Fränckel | consul-general | 1836 | City of Stockholm |
| Christian Fröberg | mayor | 1835 | Västernorrland County |
| Henric Gahn | bruksägare | 1820 | Kopparberg County |
| Gustaf Fredrik Gilljam | lecturer | 1832 | Gävleborg County |
| Magnus Hallenborg | ryttmästare | 1828 | Malmöhus County |
| Carl Birger Hasselrot | vogt | 1842 | Kalmar County Southern |
| Robert von Hedenberg | captain | 1830 | Västerbotten County |
| Adolf Helander | former first surveyor | 1820 | Södermanland County |
| Karl Husberg | director general for administrative affairs | 1854 | Västerbotten County |
| Johan Jeansson | wholesale dealer | 1831 | Kalmar County Southern |
| Paul Jönsson | land tenure | 1822 | Skaraborg County |
| Robert Kajerdt | acting vice-chancellor | 1831 | Kalmar County Northern |
| Ingemar Kerfstedt | pharmacist | 1845 | Halland County |
| Rudolf Klinckowström | colonel | 1816 | Älvsborg County |
| Carl Klingspor | captain | 1847 | Skaraborg County |
| Philip Klingspor | former captain | 1845 | Östergötland County |
| Ludvig Kockum | land tenure | 1835 | Malmöhus County |
| Emil Königsfeldt | vogt | 1823 | Kopparberg County |
| Robert von Kræmer | major | 1825 | Älvsborg County |
| Julius Edvard von Krusenstierna | Postmaster-General | 1841 | Värmland County |
| Gustaf Lagerbjelke | former county governor | 1817 | Södermanland County |
| Anders Larsson | farmer | 1822 | Skaraborg County |
| Liss Olof Larsson | fullmäktig i riksbanken | 1838 | Kronoberg County |
| Abraham Leijonhufvud | lieutenant general | 1823 | Kopparberg County |
| Sten Leijonhufvud | lieutenant colonel | 1826 | Södermanland County |
| Casimir Lewenhaupt | former captain | 1827 | Jämtland County |
| Karl Liljesköld | vogt | 1837 | Värmland County |
| Wilhelm Nils Andreas Lindahl | former auditör | 1825 | Blekinge County |
| John Lindqvist | vice-consul | 1845 | Västernorrland County |
| Pehr Lithander | wholesale dealer | 1835 | Älvsborg County |
| Wilhelm Lothigius | county governor | 1836 | Halland County |
| Christian Lundeberg | bruksägare | 1842 | Gävleborg County |
| Johan Lundin | land tenure | 1823 | Stockholm County |
| Carl Herman Lundström | bergmeister | 1828 | Värmland County |
| Johan Mallmin | land tenure | 1840 | Västmanland County |
| Alfred de Maré | bruksägare | 1831 | Kalmar County Northern |
| Ola Nilsson i Ranseröd | farmer | 1837 | Kristianstad County |
| Carl Nordenfelt | mayor | 1837 | Värmland County |
| Carl Nyström | doctor of philosophy | 1839 | Gothenburg and Bohus County |
| Wilhelm Odelberg | former lieutenant | 1844 | Stockholm County |
| Herman Ölander | vogt | 1841 | Västernorrland County |
| Gottfrid Olsén | manufacturer | 1848 | Värmland County |
| Petter Olsson | consul | 1830 | Malmöhus County |
| August Östergren | minister | 1832 | Gotland County |
| John Pehrsson | farmer | 1826 | Kristianstad County |
| John Philipson | wholesale dealer | 1829 | City of Norrköping |
| count Alfred Piper | överhovstallmästare | 1834 | Malmöhus County |
| Victor von Post | bruksägare | 1825 | Östergötland County |
| Patric Reuterswärd | Marshal of the Court | 1820 | Västmanland County |
| Fredrick Richter | fullmäktig i riksbanken | 1819 | Kronoberg County |
| Julius Roman | vogt | 1843 | Jämtland County |
| Axel Ros | bruksägare | 1833 | Värmland County |
| Per Samzelius | statskommissarie | 1827 | Kalmar County Southern |
| Johan Sandberg | vice-chancellor | 1834 | Kalmar County Southern |
| Johan Sanne | wholesale dealer | 1836 | Gothenburg and Bohus County |
| Werner von Schulzenheim | former lieutenant colonel | 1833 | Örebro County |
| Edward Sederholm | land tenure | 1828 | Södermanland County |
| Cornelius Sjöcrona | county governor | 1835 | Skaraborg County |
| Axel Sjögreen | ryttmästare | 1836 | Jönköping County |
| Jonas Sjölund | hemmansägare | 1830 | Västernorrland County |
| Lars Olsson Smith | wholesale dealer | 1836 | Blekinge County |
| Magnus Söderberg | farmer | 1835 | Jönköping County |
| Wilhelm Söderhjelm | bruksägare | 1842 | Gävleborg County |
| Wilhelm Spånberg | bruksägare | 1842 | Jönköping County |
| count Gustaf Sparre | chamberlain | 1834 | Västernorrland County |
| Harald Spens | county governor | 1827 | Kronoberg County |
| Joseph Stephens | bruksägare | 1841 | Kronoberg County |
| Wilhelm Stråle af Ekna | former county governor | 1816 | Stockholm County |
| Ernst Stridsberg | manufacturer | 1839 | Älvsborg County |
| Fredrik von Strokirch | Marshal of the Court | 1824 | Jönköping County |
| Anton Niklas Sundberg | archbishop | 1818 | Gothenburg and Bohus County |
| Axel Svedelius | captain | 1836 | Värmland County |
| Fredrik von Sydow | pharmacist | 1832 | Halland County |
| Hugo Tamm | land tenure | 1840 | Uppsala County |
| Gustaf Wilhelm Sebastian Tham | fabriksdisponent | 1839 | Jönköping County |
| Ragnar Törnebladh | lecturer | 1833 | City of Stockholm |
| Gustaf Tornérhjelm | ryttmästare | 1854 | Malmöhus County |
| Curry Treffenberg | county governor | 1825 | Kopparberg County |
| Carl Trolle-Bonde | land tenure | 1843 | Kristianstad County |
| baron Gustaf af Ugglas | former minister | 1820 | City of Stockholm |
| Magnus Unger | vogt | 1832 | Örebro County |
| Carl Fredrik Wærn | acting president | 1819 | City of Gothenburg |
| Carl Wilhelm Wallberg | manufacturer | 1827 | Halland County |
| Isak Wallberg | manufacturer | 1825 | Älvsborg County |
| August Weinberg | land tenure | 1848 | Skaraborg County |
| Gunnar Wennerberg | minister | 1817 | Kronoberg County |
| Olof Widmark | first surveyor | 1831 | Gävleborg County |
| Sigfrid Wieselgren | director-general | 1843 | City of Gothenburg |
| Knut Wijkmark | farmer | 1849 | Skaraborg County |
| Johan Wolmer Wrangel von Brehmer | överstekamarjunkare | 1836 | Malmöhus County |
