= Gustaf Lagerbjelke =

Swedish politician (1817–1895)

Gustaf Lagerbjelke, 3rd Count Lagerbjelke RoKKMO
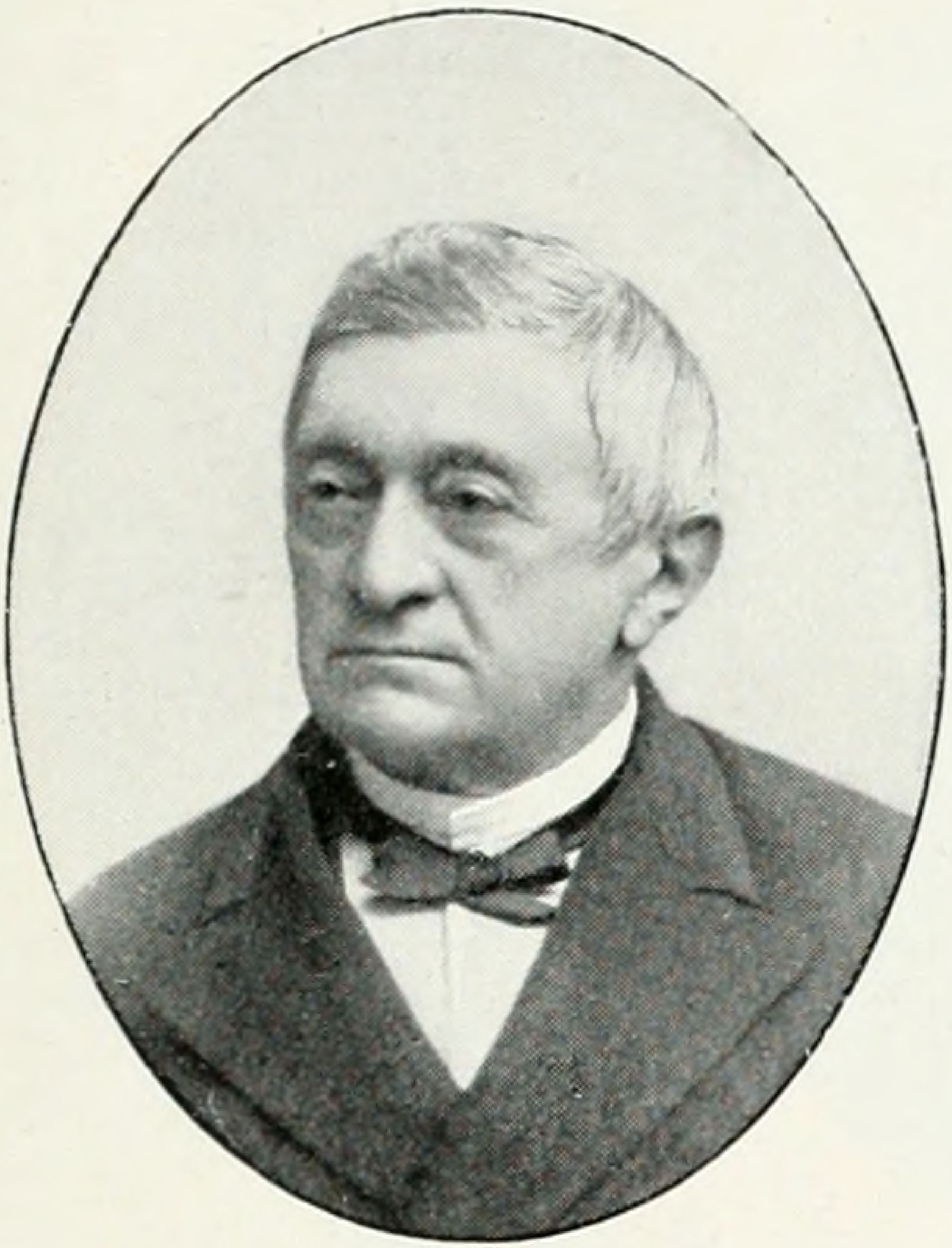

Lord Marshal
- In office 1862–1863
- Monarch: Charles XV
- Preceded by: Gustaf Adolf Vive Sparre
- In office 1865–1866
- Monarch: Charles XV

1st Speaker of Första kammaren
- In office 1867–1876
- Monarchs: Charles XV; Oscar II
- Succeeded by: Henning Hamilton
- In office 1881–1891
- Monarch: Oscar II
- Preceded by: Anton Niklas Sundberg
- Succeeded by: Pehr von Ehrenheim

Governor of Södermanland County
- In office 27 April 1858 – 31 December 1888
- Preceded by: Gustaf Erik Frölich
- Succeeded by: Otto H. Roland Prinssköld

Member of the Riksdag of the Estates for Lagerbjelke family
- In office 1844–1866

Member of Första kammaren for Södermanland County
- In office 1867–1894

Personal details
- Born: Gustaf Lagerbjelke; 6 October 1817 Stockholm, Sweden
- Died: 6 March 1895 (aged 77) Stockholm, Sweden
- Spouse(s): Sofia Albertina Snoilsky (1943–47); Ebba Augusta Henriette Ribbing (1959–92)
- Education: Uppsala University

Count Gustaf Lagerbjelke RoKKMO (6 October 1817 – 6 March 1895) was a Swedish politician, the last Lord Marshal and the first Speaker of Första kammaren of the Riksdag.

== Biography ==
Gustaf Lagerbjelke was born 6 October 1817 on Skeppsholmen, Stockholm, to colonel Count Axel Lagerbjelke and Baroness Carolina Antoinetta Cederström. After his father's death in 1832, he became 3rd Count Lagerbjelke. Lagerbjelke studied at Uppsala University, where he became Juris utriusque kandidat in December 1838. Between 1844 and 1866, he served in the Riksdag of the Estates for the Lagerbjelke family.

Along with Henning Hamilton, Gillis Bildt and Eric Josias Sparre, Lagerbjelke became one of the leaders of the Junker Party, and was the party's authority on constitutional and formal issues. In connection with the representation reform as the country moved to a parliamentary system, he submitted his own proposal, but it was not adopted.

From 1867, he was a member of Första kammaren of the Riksdag and its speaker from 1867–1876 and 1881–1891. From 27 April 1858 to 31 December 1888, he was Governor of Södermanland County. Lagerbjelke died on 6 March 1895 in Brännkyrka parish in Stockholm.

== Personal life ==
Lagerbjelke married countess Sofia Albertina Snoilsky, daughter of commander count Gustaf Snoilsky and Ulrika Juliana Lode, in Stockholm on 5 December 1843. After her death in 1847, he married Ebba Augusta Henriette Ribbing, daughter of rittmeister Bengt Ribbing and Augusta Christina Schmiterlöw, on 19 July 1859 on Liljeholmen in Jönköping.
