= Gustaf Lagerbielke =

Gustaf Lagerbielke may refer to:

- Gustaf Lagerbjelke, Swedish politician
- Gustaf Lagerbielke (footballer), Swedish footballer
