= Speaker of the Riksdag =

Presiding officer of Swedish legislature

- Riksdagens talman
- Coat of Arms of the Swedish Parliament

- Flag of Sweden

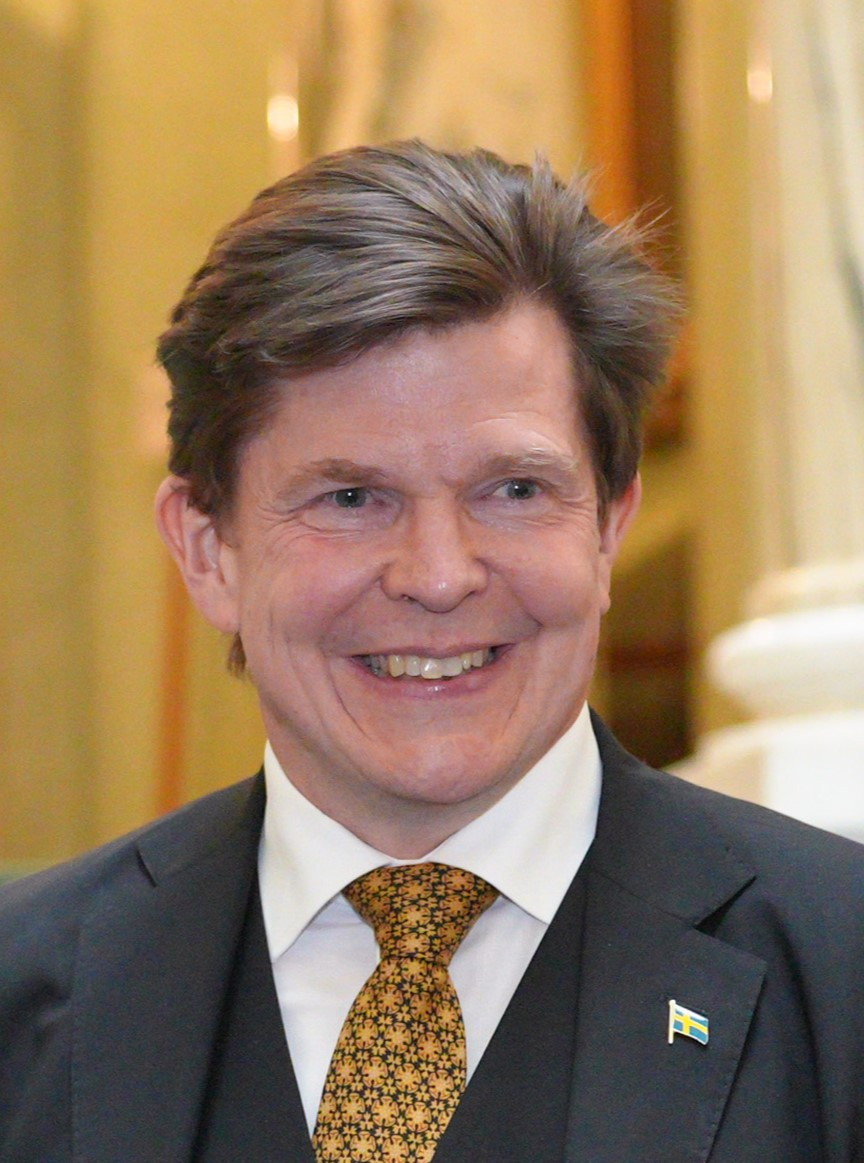
- Incumbent; Andreas Norlén since 24 September 2018
- The Riksdag
- Style: Swedish: Herr talman (English: "Mr Speaker")
- Seat: Parliament House
- Nominator: Riksdag
- Appointer: The Alderman
- Term length: Four years (de facto)
- Inaugural holder: Henry Allard
- Formation: 1867; 159 years ago
- Deputy: See List of Deputy Speakers
- Salary: 2,112,000 kr annually
- Website: www.riksdagen.se

The speaker of the Riksdag (Swedish: Riksdagens talman) is the presiding officer of the national unicameral legislature in Sweden.

The Riksdag underwent profound changes in 1867, when the medieval Riksdag of the Estates was abolished. The new form of the Riksdag included two elected chambers, each with its own speaker. Since the de facto introduction of parliamentarism in 1917, the Riksdag has properly functioned as the institution to which the prime minister and the government are held accountable. In 1971 the institution was transformed into a unicameral legislature with 350 members, reduced to 349 in 1976 to avoid parliamentary deadlocks. Since 1975, in accordance with the Instrument of Government of 1974, it is the speaker and no longer the monarch who appoints and dismisses the prime minister.

The current speaker is Andreas Norlén, who has first elected in September 2018, and then again in 2022 and 2026.

== Duties of the speaker ==
The speaker is the head and presiding officer of the Riksdag, and is elected by the chamber as the first order of business when the Riksdag re-convenes following a general election. As such, the speaker coordinates the work that takes place in the Riksdag. The office is mandated in the Swedish constitution and the duties of the office are set out in the Instrument of Government (1974) and the Riksdag Act.

The speaker themselves does not take part in debates, nor do they participate in the parliamentary committees. Consequently, they have no vote, and a substitute is appointed to fill his or her seat in the Riksdag during their time in office. While the speaker is still one of the elected representatives of the Riksdag, they are expected to remain unbiased and objective with regards to the political issues that are debated.

In terms of official protocol, the position of speaker is the second highest-ranked public position in Sweden. Only the monarch outranks the speaker since the monarch is the head of state. Additionally, the speaker nominally outranks the prime minister of Sweden, even though (since the 1974–75 reforms) that person is the country's de jure and de facto chief executive.

=== Appointment and dismissal of the prime minister ===
One of the more important aspects of the work of the speaker is to head negotiations concerning the forming of a new government in case there is a shift of power after an election. The speaker can then dismiss a prime minister who is voted out of office, which happened for the first time on 25 September 2018. After the negotiations, the speaker proposes the new prime ministerial candidate to the chamber, and following a positive vote, the speaker signs the commission (Swedish: förordnande) on behalf of the Riksdag. The prime minister appoints and dismisses their own cabinet ministers, forming the government (Swedish: Regeringen), without the involvement of the speaker.

In case of either a voluntary resignation or a vote of no confidence, the letter of resignation of a prime minister is handed to the speaker.

In most other parliamentary systems, including other constitutional monarchies, these duties are instead handled by the head of state. Relieving the Swedish monarch of political powers, although not the key objective from the outset, nevertheless became an important part of constitutional reform in the 1970s.

The speaker also attends the special change-of-government council held at the Stockholm Palace following the appointment of a new prime minister. During these meetings the speaker informs the monarch on the procedure of forming the incoming government. The monarch then announces the change of government.

=== Deputy speakers ===
The speaker is assisted by three deputy speakers who are also elected by the chamber. Traditionally, the second, third and fourth largest parties gets to name of one of their members for these offices. There is some disagreement whether the largest party or the leading party of the largest party bloc should hold the speakership (and thus also the position of First Deputy Speaker). Unlike the Speaker (and cabinet ministers), the deputy Speakers are not replaced by an alternate and remain members of the Riksdag with voting rights.

=== Regent ad interim ===
In case all adult members of the Swedish royal family who are in the line of succession to the throne, as prescribed in the Act of Succession, are out of the country, the speaker assumes the role of Regent ad interim (Swedish: Riksföreståndare). This would also be the case if they were all to decease.

Below are listed all speakers who have acted as Regent ad interim:

- Ingemund Bengtsson (2-3 July 1988)

=== Riksdag Board ===
The speaker chairs the Riksdag Board (Swedish: Riksdagsstyrelsen), which deliberates on the organisation of the work of the Riksdag, directs the work of the Riksdag Administration (Swedish: Riksdagsförvaltningen) and decides upon matters of major significance concerning the international contacts programme.

=== War Delegation ===
The speaker chairs the War Delegation (Swedish: krigsdelegationen), when it is deemed necessary to convene.

== List of speakers ==
=== Speakers of the bicameral Riksdag (1867–1970) ===
==== Speakers of the First Chamber (upper house) ====
- Gustaf Lagerbjelke (1867–1876)
- Henning Hamilton (1877)
- Anton Niklas Sundberg (1878–1880)
- Gustaf Lagerbjelke (1881–1891)
- Pehr von Ehrenheim (1891–1895)
- Gustaf Sparre (1896–1908)
- Christian Lundeberg (1909–1911)
- Ivar Afzelius (1912–1915)
- Hugo Hamilton (1916–1928)
- Axel Vennersten (1928–1936)
- Johan Nilsson (1937–1955)
- John Bergvall, Liberal (1956–1959)
- Gustaf Sundelin, Liberal (1959–1964)
- Erik Boheman, Liberal (1965–1970)

==== Speakers of the Second Chamber (lower house) ====
- Anton Niklas Sundberg (1867–1872)
- Ferdinand Asker (1873–1875)
- Arvid Posse (1876–1880)
- Olof Wijk (1880–1890)
- Gustaf Ryding (1891)
- Carl Herslow (1892–1893)
- Robert De la Gardie (1894–1902)
- Axel Swartling (1903–1912)
- Carl Bonde (1913)
- Johan Widén (1914–1917)
- Daniel Persson (1918)
- Herman Lindqvist, Social Democrat (1918–1921)
- Viktor Larsson, Social Democrat (1922–1923)
- Herman Lindqvist, Social Democrat (1924–1927)
- Viktor Larsson, Social Democrat (1927)
- Bernhard Eriksson, Social Democrat (1928–1932)
- August Sävström, Social Democrat (1933–1952)
- Gustaf Nilsson, Social Democrat (1953–1957)
- Sven Patrik Svensson (1958–1960)
- Fridolf Thapper, Social Democrat (1960–1968)
- Henry Allard, Social Democrat (1969–1970)

=== Speakers of the unicameral Riksdag (1971–present) ===
Portrait	Speaker (Born-Died)	Term			Political Party	Election	Constituency
Portrait	Speaker (Born-Died)	Took office	Left office	Duration	Political Party	Election	Constituency
Henry Allard	Henry Allard (1911–1996)	15 January 1971	1 October 1979	8 years, 259 days	Social Democrats	1970; 1973; 1976	Örebro County
Ingemund Bengtsson	Ingemund Bengtsson (1919–2000)	1 October 1979	3 October 1988	9 years, 2 days	Social Democrats	1979; 1982; 1985	Halland County
Thage G. Peterson	Thage G. Peterson (born 1933)	3 October 1988	30 September 1991	2 years, 362 days	Social Democrats	1988	Stockholm County
Ingegerd Troedsson	Ingegerd Troedsson (1929–2012)	30 September 1991	3 October 1994	3 years, 3 days	Moderate	1991	Uppsala County
Birgitta Dahl	Birgitta Dahl (1937–2024)	3 October 1994	30 September 2002	7 years, 362 days	Social Democrats	1994; 1998	Uppsala County
Björn von Sydow	Björn von Sydow (born 1945)	30 September 2002	2 October 2006	4 years, 2 days	Social Democrats	2002	Stockholm County
Per Westerberg	Per Westerberg (born 1951)	2 October 2006	29 September 2014	7 years, 362 days	Moderate	2006; 2010	Södermanland County
Urban Ahlin	Urban Ahlin (born 1964)	29 September 2014	24 September 2018	3 years, 360 days	Social Democrats	2014	Västra Götaland County
Andreas Norlén	Andreas Norlén (born 1973)	24 September 2018	Incumbent	8 years, 4 days	Moderate	2018; 2022; 2026	Östergötland County

== See also ==
- Marshal of the Realm
- County governors of Sweden

Historical predecessor

- Lantmarskalk, the presiding officer of the Estate of the Nobility in the Riksdag of the Estates before 1866.
