= Varberg =

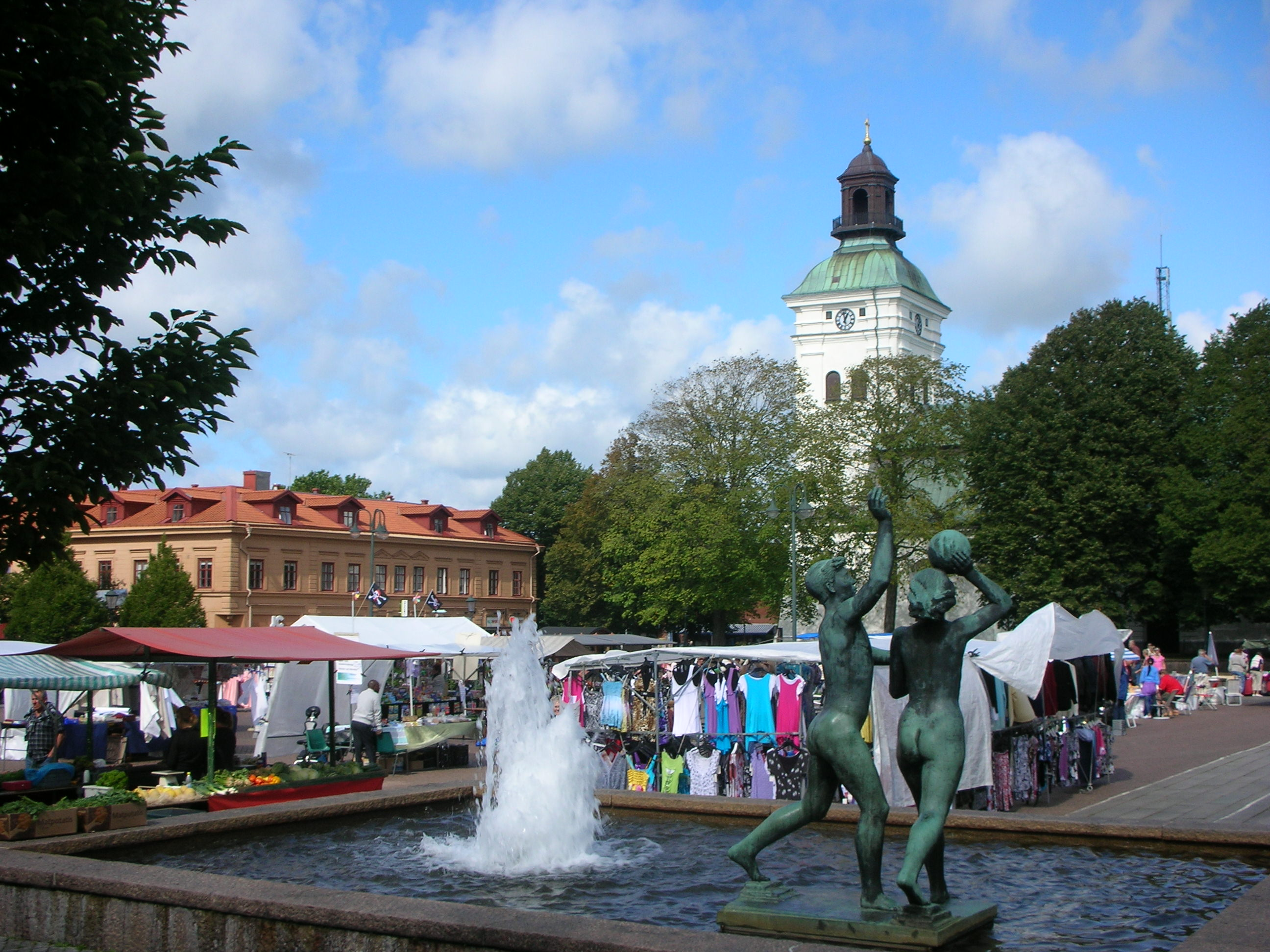
- The marketplace and Varberg Church

- Coat of arms

- Location within Halland Location within Sweden
- Coordinates: 57°07′N 12°13′E
- Country: Sweden
- Province: Halland
- County: Halland County
- Municipality: Varberg Municipality

Area
  - Total: 24.61 km^{2} (9.50 sq mi)

Population (31 December 2019)
  - Total: 35,782
  - Density: 1,454/km^{2} (3,770/sq mi)
- Time zone: UTC+1 (CET)
  - Summer (DST): UTC+2 (CEST)
- Website: varberg.se

Varberg (Swedish pronunciation: [ˈvɑ̂ːrbærj]) is a locality and the seat of Varberg Municipality, Halland County, Sweden, with 35,782 inhabitants in 2019.

Varberg and all of Halland are well known for their "typical west coast" sandy beaches. In Varberg the coast changes from wide sandy beaches to rocky terrain that continues north into the Bohuslän archipelago and as far as the North Cape. Varberg is ranked as one of Sweden's most beautiful cities.

== Geography ==
Varberg is located on the Swedish west coast and is a popular beach and surfing destination for both Sweden and Europe. It has a main landmark in the large Fortress and Castle of Varberg. Through centuries many wars between Denmark and Sweden were fought here before Southern Sweden, including Varberg, became permanently Swedish in 1658 through the Treaty of Roskilde. It is a small town with architecture mainly from the turn of the century and has several green parks such as the Society Park (Societetsparken) and the English Park. The green parks were however not always there. In fact in the 19th century the town was largely without trees and green areas, being instead characterised by bald rocks and sand. The Swedish authoritative author and bishop Esaias Tegnér described it in 1826 as the least appealing place in Sweden, which has later been used in the marketing of Varberg. Today this has changed and its sandy beaches are a popular destination. Another main draw of Varberg is its natural surroundings. The landscape further inland has rolling hills with lakes and forests in contrast to the flatter coastal areas.

== Climate ==
Varberg has an oceanic climate that although moderate by Swedish standards, still retains quite large seasonal variation. Summers are in general cooler than both in Halmstad and Gothenburg, with highs being moderated by the marine airflow. Although this moderation occurs, some summer days can be very warm, and some winter nights see severe frosts. The highest recorded temperature since 1901 is 33.6 °C (92.5 °F) on July 31, 2018, and the lowest is -25.5 °C (-13.9 °F) in January 1942.

Climate data for Varberg (temperatures 2002–2020 averages; extremes 1901–present)
Month	Jan	Feb	Mar	Apr	May	Jun	Jul	Aug	Sep	Oct	Nov	Dec	Year
Record high °C (°F)	9.4 (48.9)	10.8 (51.4)	19.2 (66.6)	27.6 (81.7)	30.5 (86.9)	31.9 (89.4)	33.6 (92.5)	33.1 (91.6)	30.0 (86.0)	21.6 (70.9)	14.4 (57.9)	10.4 (50.7)	33.6 (92.5)
Mean maximum °C (°F)	6.5 (43.7)	7.0 (44.6)	12.4 (54.3)	19.1 (66.4)	26.0 (78.8)	26.8 (80.2)	28.8 (83.8)	28.5 (83.3)	23.6 (74.5)	17.1 (62.8)	12.4 (54.3)	7.9 (46.2)	30.2 (86.4)
Mean daily maximum °C (°F)	2.2 (36.0)	2.7 (36.9)	5.9 (42.6)	12.0 (53.6)	16.8 (62.2)	19.9 (67.8)	22.0 (71.6)	21.5 (70.7)	17.8 (64.0)	11.9 (53.4)	7.2 (45.0)	4.2 (39.6)	12.0 (53.6)
Daily mean °C (°F)	0.1 (32.2)	0.3 (32.5)	2.6 (36.7)	7.5 (45.5)	11.7 (53.1)	15.6 (60.1)	17.9 (64.2)	17.6 (63.7)	14.2 (57.6)	8.8 (47.8)	5.1 (41.2)	2.1 (35.8)	8.6 (47.5)
Mean daily minimum °C (°F)	−2.1 (28.2)	−2.1 (28.2)	−0.8 (30.6)	3.0 (37.4)	7.6 (45.7)	11.3 (52.3)	13.8 (56.8)	13.6 (56.5)	10.6 (51.1)	5.6 (42.1)	2.9 (37.2)	0.0 (32.0)	5.3 (41.5)
Mean minimum °C (°F)	−11.9 (10.6)	−10.7 (12.7)	−8.5 (16.7)	−4.2 (24.4)	0.1 (32.2)	5.6 (42.1)	8.9 (48.0)	7.6 (45.7)	2.2 (36.0)	−2.8 (27.0)	−6.6 (20.1)	−8.6 (16.5)	−13.9 (7.0)
Record low °C (°F)	−25.5 (−13.9)	−22.0 (−7.6)	−22.1 (−7.8)	−9.5 (14.9)	−5.1 (22.8)	1.4 (34.5)	4.7 (40.5)	3.3 (37.9)	−2.4 (27.7)	−9.7 (14.5)	−12.6 (9.3)	−20.8 (−5.4)	−25.5 (−13.9)
Average precipitation mm (inches)	76.2 (3.00)	54.0 (2.13)	47.5 (1.87)	36.5 (1.44)	46.4 (1.83)	76.3 (3.00)	84.5 (3.33)	105.8 (4.17)	74.5 (2.93)	96.1 (3.78)	80.3 (3.16)	78.7 (3.10)	856.8 (33.74)
Source 1: SMHI Open Data
Source 2: SMHI Average Data 2002-2020

== History ==
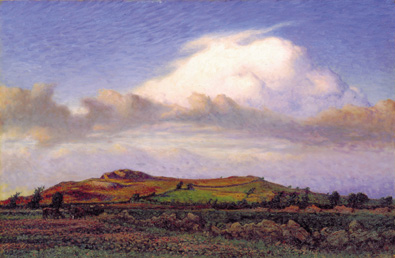
The Håsten Hill at Varberg (1898), painting by Nils Kreuger

A fortress called Varberg (at that time written Wardbergh, "watch hill") was erected in the 1280s as part of a chain of military establishments along the coast, in what was then Danish territory. In the middle of the 14th century, the old settlement "Getakärr" 1 kilometre (0.6 miles) north of the fortress took its new name from the fortress. The town was moved 5 km (3 mi) northwards around the year 1400. It was destroyed during the Kalmar War (1611–1612) and rebuilt near the fortress. In 1645 Halland passed from Denmark to Sweden by the Treaty of Brömsebro for a period of 30 years. It had at that time about 600 inhabitants. The transfer was made permanent by the Treaty of Roskilde in 1658. The town was moved again after a fire in 1666 to where the city centre is located today. The city was devastated by a huge fire in 1863 and was subsequently rebuilt with stone or brick houses. In 1890 the population figure had passed 4,000 and with industrialization it reached 8,500 in 1930. The local government reform of 1971 made Varberg the seat of the much larger Varberg Municipality, with a current population of close to 56,000 inhabitants. Although several houses were torn down in the 1970s, most of the city center still remains intact.

== Sights ==
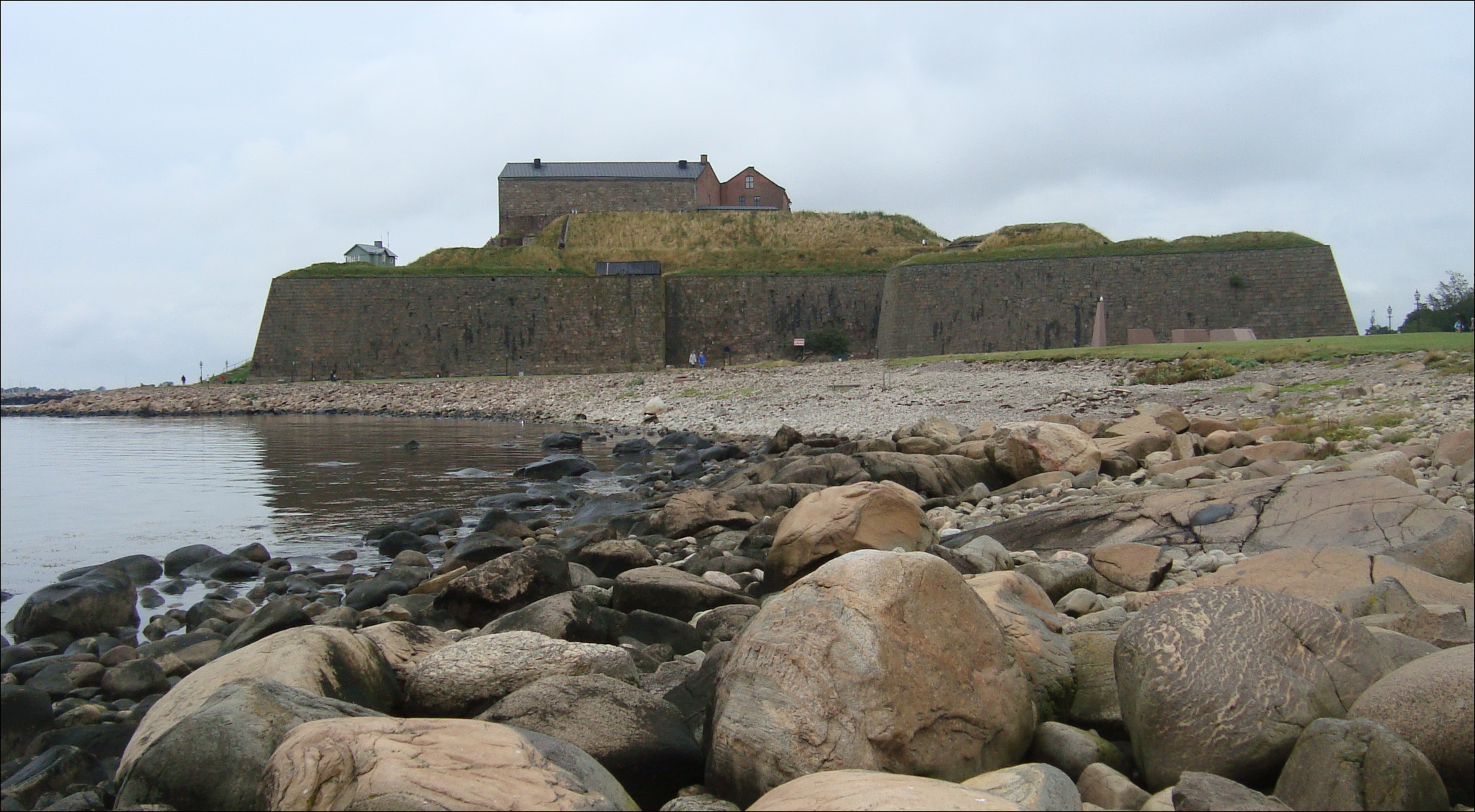
View of Varberg Fortress

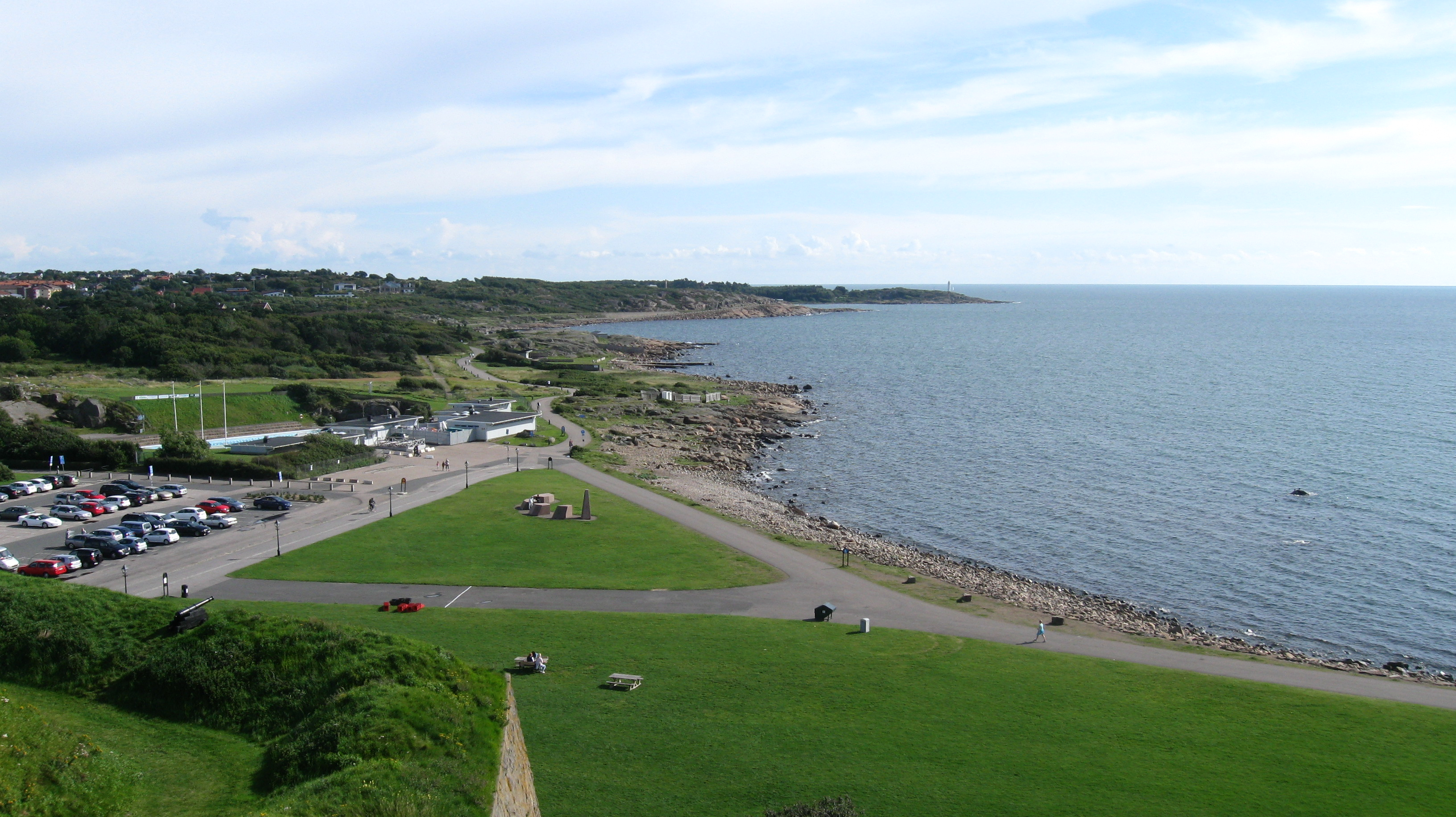
View from Varberg Fortress, overlooking the beach promenade

Varberg's fortress is its most notable historical building, mostly because of its size as it has no architectural uniformity. It was first built as a castle in 1280, with new parts being built in successions.

Near Varberg there is the VLF transmitter Grimeton, an interesting radio-technical facility and classified by UNESCO to be a World Cultural Heritage site. It can be visited during the summer. Bexell Cottage is also located in the area.

Komedianten is a cultural and performing arts centre, built between 2010 and 2012.

== Sports ==
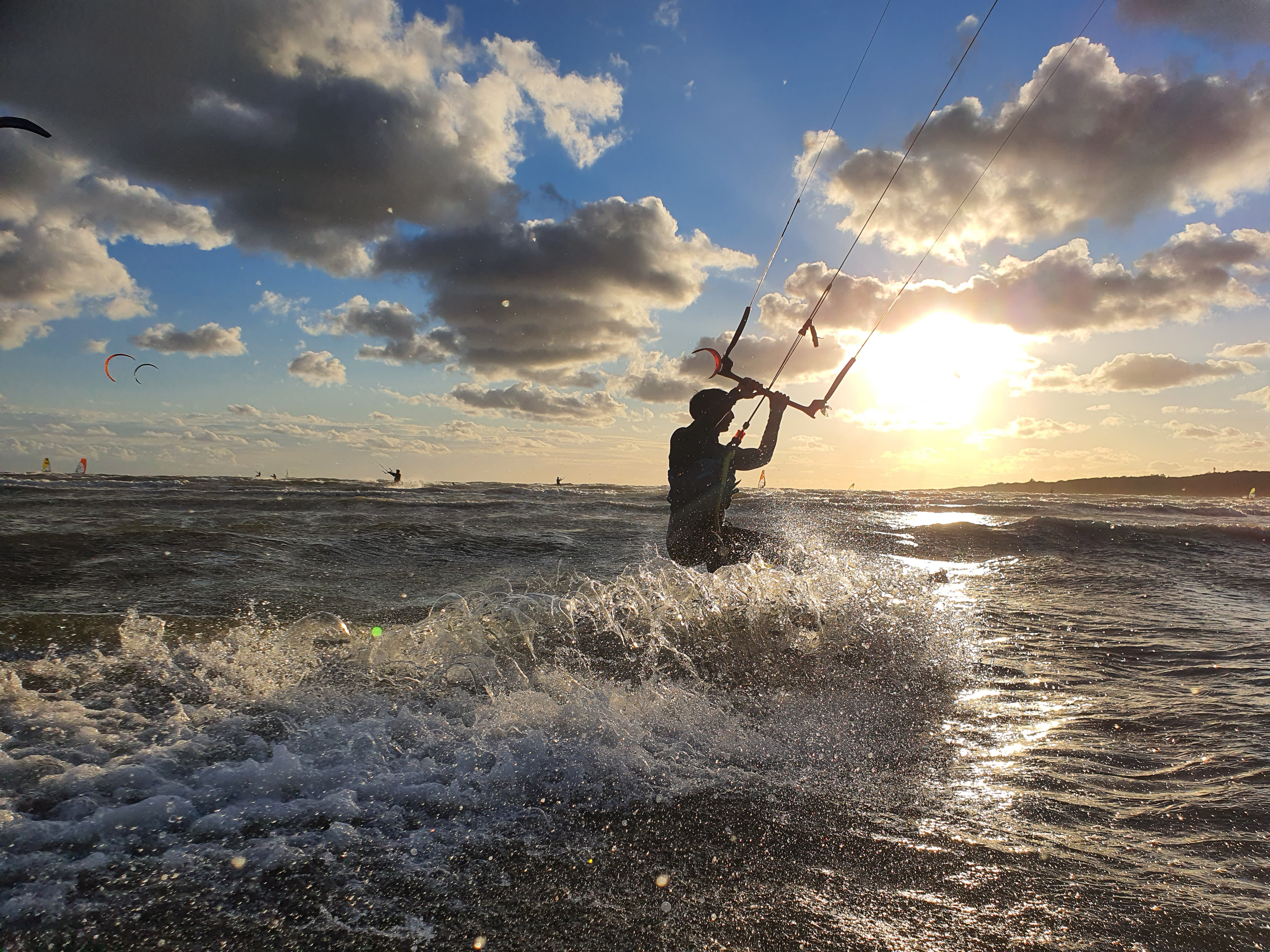
Kitesurfer in Apelvikens strand

The following sports clubs are located in Varberg:

- Varbergs BoIS FC
- Varbergs GIF FK
- Lilla Träslövs FF
- Varberg Vipers

Multiple locations in and around Varberg offer great conditions for watersports. Apelviken (Apple Bay Beach), located in the south of Varberg, has many facilities and rental spots for windsurfing, standup paddleboarding, kitesurfing and other sports.

== Transportation ==
Varberg Airport, ICAO code ESGV, is located northwest of the town of Varberg.

== European cooperation ==
- Varberg is a member city of Eurotowns network

== Notable people ==
- Ingemund Bengtsson, social democratic politician and Speaker of the Riksdag
- Niclas Eliasson, footballer
- Sophie Gustafson, golfer
- Kamchatka, hard rock band
- Andy LaRocque, guitarist, songwriter, producer
- Dick Lövgren, bass guitarist for Swedish extreme metal band Meshuggah
- Sten Lundin, Motocross World Champion, 1959, 1961
- Sven Nylander, 400m hurdler
- Gösta Pettersson, biochemist
- Mathilda Ranch, early Varberg photographer
- Stefan Selaković, footballer
- Margareta Svensson, singer, performer, television personality
- Otto Torell, Swedish naturalist and geologist
- Dafina Zeqiri, singer
