= Ingemund Bengtsson =

Swedish politician (1919–2000)

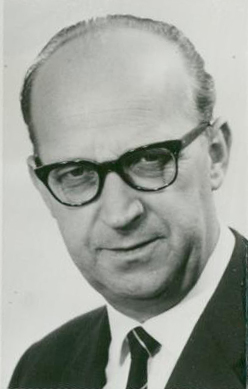

Speaker of the Riksdag
- In office 1 October 1979 – 3 October 1988
- Monarch: Carl XVI Gustaf
- Preceded by: Henry Allard
- Succeeded by: Thage G. Peterson

Minister for Agriculture
- In office 25 January 1969 – 3 November 1973
- Prime Minister: Tage Erlander; Olof Palme
- Preceded by: Eric Holmqvist
- Succeeded by: Svante Lundkvist

Minister of the Interior
- In office 3 November 1973 – 31 December 1973
- Prime Minister: Olof Palme
- Preceded by: Eric Holqvist
- Succeeded by: Position abolished

Minister for Employment
- In office 1 January 1974 – 8 October 1976
- Prime Minister: Olof Palme
- Preceded by: Position established
- Succeeded by: Per Ahlmark

Member of the Riksdag
- In office 11 January 1971 – 3 October 1988
- Constituency: Halland County

Member of the Second Chamber
- In office 1951–1971
- Constituency: Halland County

Personal details
- Born: 30 January 1919 Veddige, Sweden
- Died: 12 April 2000 (aged 81) Varberg, Sweden

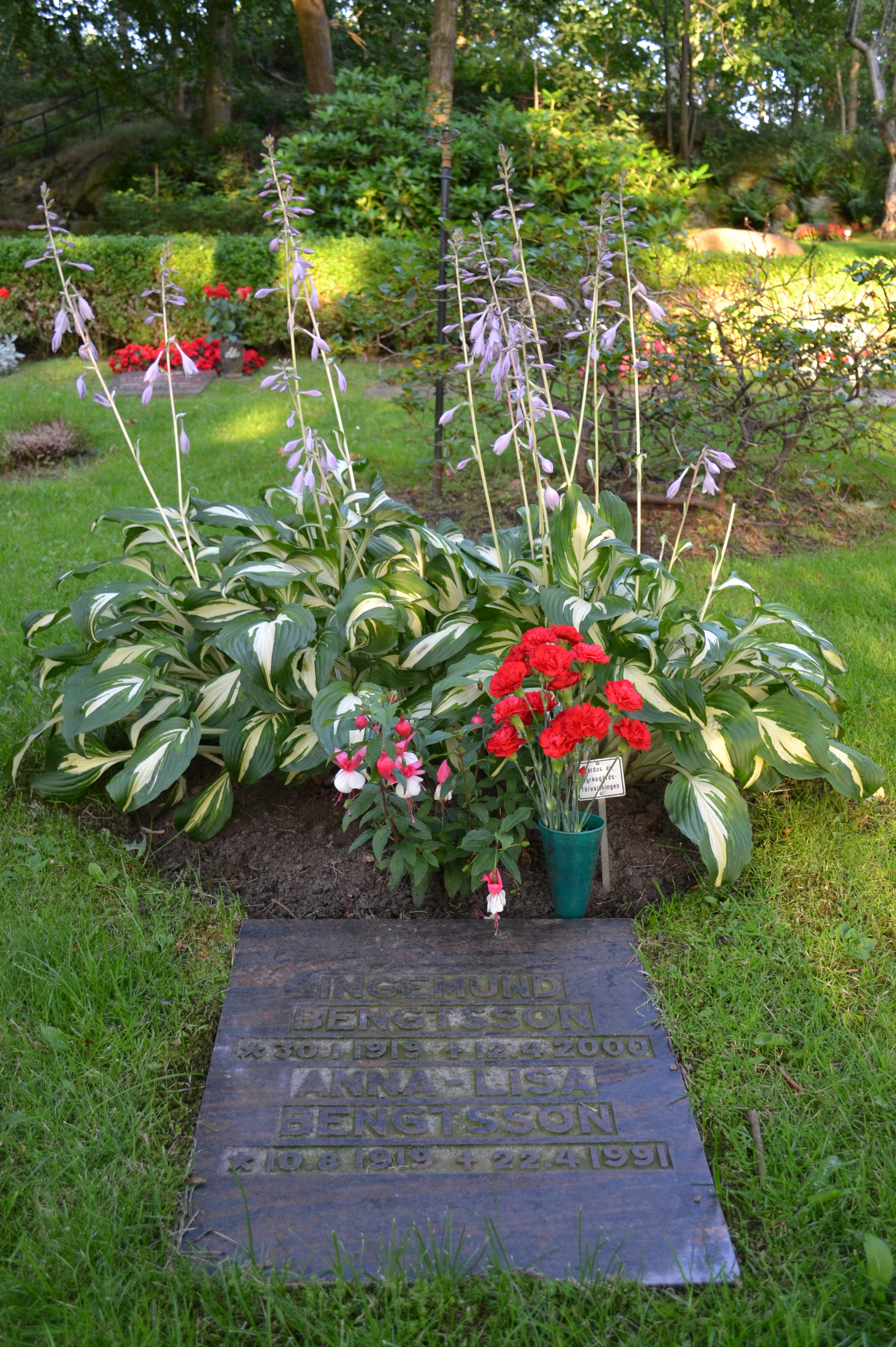
The grave of Ingemund Bengtsson and his wife Anna-Lisa at Saint George's Cemetery in Varberg, Sweden.

Sten Bertil Ingemund Bengtsson (30 January 1919 – 12 April 2000) was a Swedish Social democratic politician, and Speaker of the Riksdag from 1979 to 1988.

He was born on 30 January 1919 in Veddige. He moved to Varberg and started working at the Monark bicycle factory at age 15. He went on to become a prominent figure in local politics before he was elected as a Member of Parliament in 1951. He served as minister of agriculture 1969–1973, minister of the interior 1973 and minister for employment 1974-1976 before being elected as Speaker of the Parliament in 1979.

Bengtsson also performed the duties of Regent Ad Interim 2–3 July 1988. When the King of Sweden is prevented from performing his duties as Head of State, for reasons of illness, travel or other, and when no other member of the Royal House, who is in the line of succession, is present within the realm, the Government issues a decree that establishes a Regent ad interim who will uphold the duties as Head of State for the duration of His Majesty's incapacity. Bengtsson is the only non royal to so far serve as regent under the 1974 Instrument of Government.

He died on 12 April 2000. He is buried with his wife Anna-Lisa (1919–1991) in Varberg.

| Preceded by Henry Allard | Speaker of the Riksdag; 1979 - 1988 | Succeeded by Thage G. Peterson |
