= Nathan Söderblom =

Swedish bishop

The Most Reverend Nathan Söderblom
- Archbishop of Uppsala; Primate of Sweden
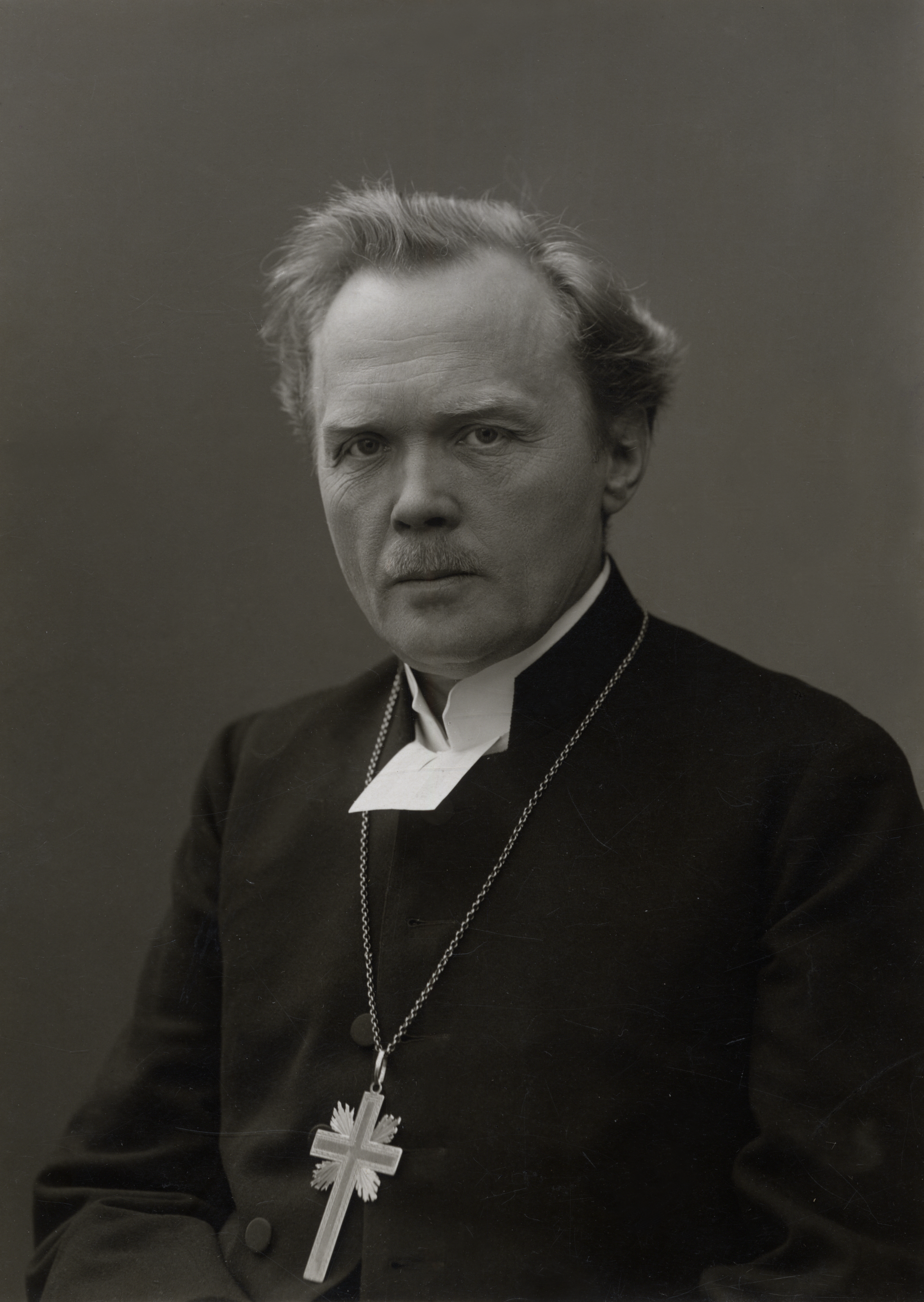
- Church: Church of Sweden
- Diocese: Uppsala
- Elected: 20 May 1914
- In office: 1914–1931
- Predecessor: Johan August Ekman
- Successor: Erling Eidem

Orders
- Ordination: 1893 (priest)
- Consecration: 8 November 1914 by Gottfrid Billing

Personal details
- Born: Lars Olof Jonathan Söderblom; 15 January 1866 Trönö, Sweden
- Died: 12 July 1931 (aged 65) Uppsala, Sweden
- Denomination: Church of Sweden
- Parents: Jonas Söderblom and Nikolina Sophie Blûme
- Spouse: Anna Söderblom (born as Forsell) (1870–1955)
- Children: 12, including Staffan
- Education: Uppsala University
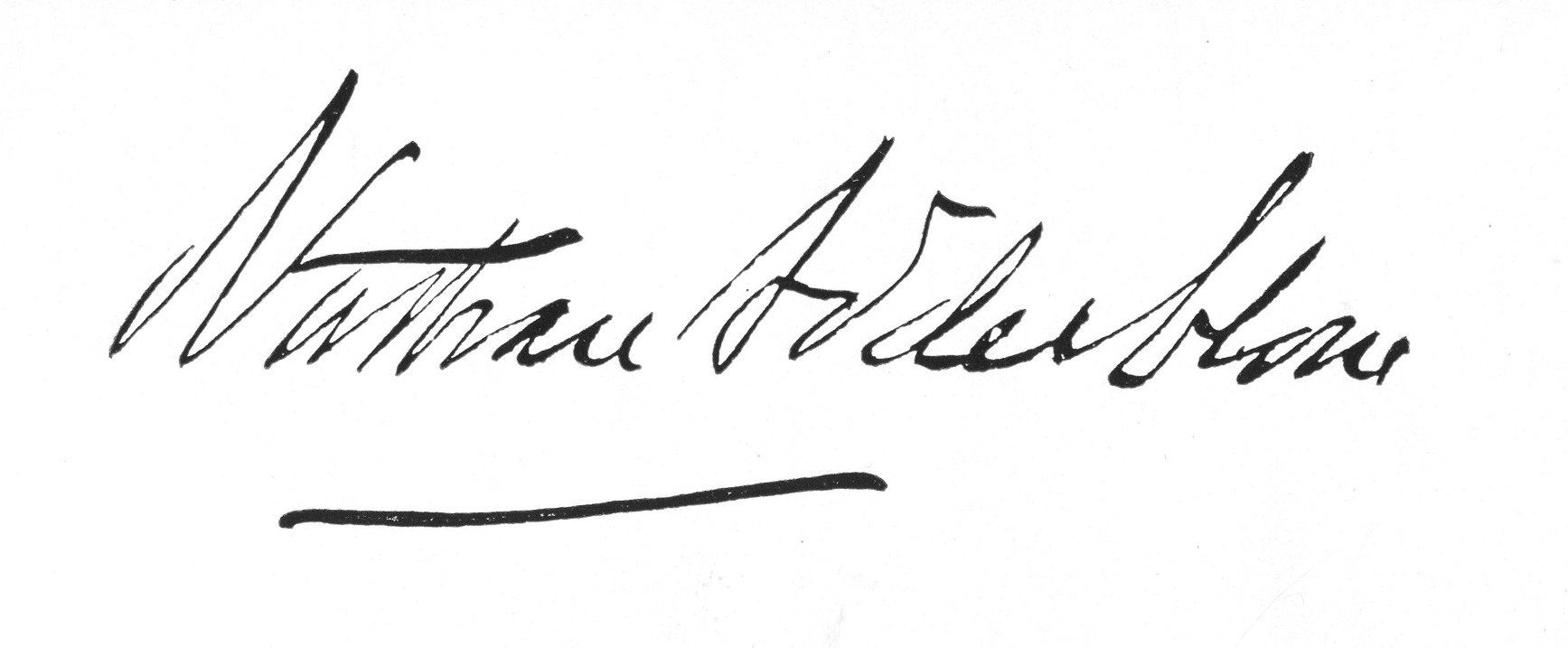
- Signature: Nathan Söderblom's signature

- Coat of arms

Ordination history of Nathan Söderblom
History
Priestly ordination
- Ordained by: Gottfrid Billing
- Date: 1893
Episcopal consecration
- Consecrated by: Gottfrid Billing
- Date: 8 November 1914
- Place: Uppsala Cathedral

Lars Olof Jonathan Söderblom (Swedish pronunciation: [ˈnɑ̌ːtan ˈsø̌ːdɛrblʊm]; 15 January 1866 – 12 July 1931) was a Swedish bishop. He was the Church of Sweden Archbishop of Uppsala from 1914 to 1931, and recipient of the 1930 Nobel Peace Prize. He is commemorated in the Calendar of Saints of the Lutheran Church on 12 July.

== Life and career ==
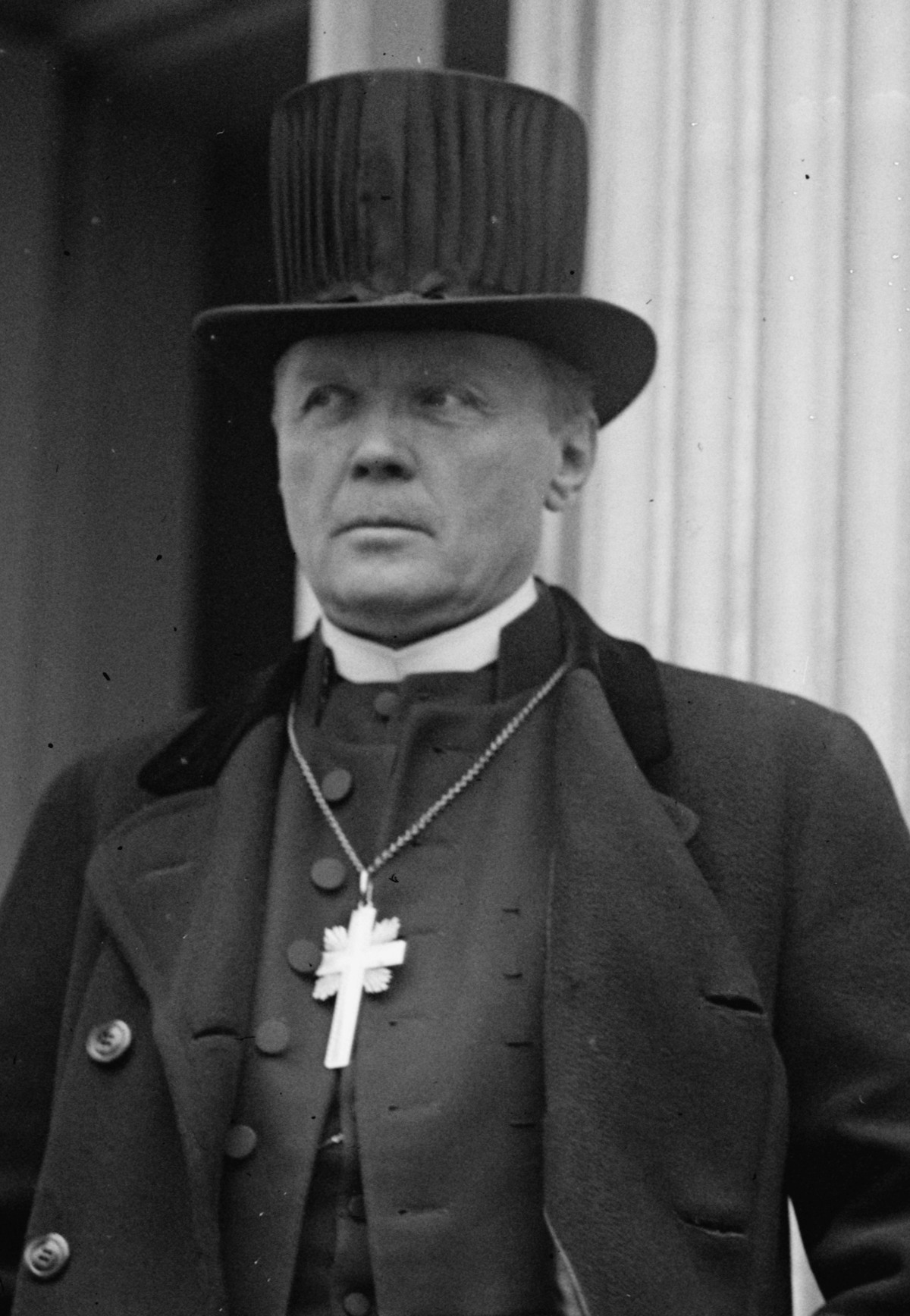
Archbishop Nathan Söderblom in 1923.

Söderblom was born in the village of Trönö in Söderhamn Municipality, Gävleborg County. His father was a parish priest. He enrolled at Uppsala University in 1883. Although not initially convinced what he wanted to study, he eventually decided to follow in his father's footsteps. On returning from a journey to the United States, he was ordained as a priest in 1893. During the years 1892 and 1893, he was first vice president and then president of the Uppsala Student Union.

From 1894 to 1901, he had a ministry position at the Swedish Embassy in Paris, where his congregation included both Alfred Nobel (1833–1896) and August Strindberg (1849–1912). In 1897, he officiated at the memorial service for Nobel. From 1901 to 1914, Söderblom held a chair in the School of Theology at Uppsala University and from 1912 to 1914 was also a professor of religious studies at Leipzig University. In 1914, he was elected as Archbishop of Uppsala, the head of the Lutheran church in Sweden. During the First World War, he called on all Christian leaders to work for peace and justice while working to alleviate the conditions of prisoners of war and refugees.

He believed that church unity had the specific purpose of presenting the gospel to the world and that the messages of Jesus were relevant to social life. His leadership of the Christian "Life and Work" movement in the 1920s has led him to be recognised as one of the principal founders of the ecumenical movement. He had begun the movement toward intercommunion between the Church of Sweden and the Church of England and was a close associate of the English ecumenist George Bell (1883–1958), Dean of Canterbury, Bishop of Chichester. He was instrumental in chairing the World Conference of Life and Work in Stockholm, in 1925. In 1930 he was awarded the Nobel Peace Prize.

== Selected works ==
- Den enskilde och kyrkan : föredrag (1909)
- Helighet och kultur (1913)
- Gudstrons uppkomst (1914)
- 9 Works by Nathan Söderblom at The Documentation of Chinese Christianity program, Hong Kong Baptist University Library

== See also ==
- World Council of Churches
- Ecumenism

== Other sources ==
- Andrae, Tor J.E. (1931) Nathan Söderblom (Uppsala University)
- Curtis, Charles J. (1967) Söderblom: Ecumenical Pioneer (Minneapolis, Augsburg Publishing House)
- Jonson, Jonas (2016) Nathan Söderblom: Called to Serve (Grand Rapids: Eerdmans Publishing Company) ISBN 0802873081
- Katz, Peter (1949) Nathan Söderblom: A Prophet of Christian Unity (London, James Clarke)
- Sundkler, Beng (1968) Nathan Söderblom: His Life and Work (Lutterworth Press) ISBN 9780718815738

Titles in Lutheranism
Preceded by Johan August Ekman	Archbishop of Uppsala; Primate of Sweden; 1914–1931	Succeeded by Erling Eidem
Cultural offices
Preceded by Waldemar Rudin	Swedish Academy, Seat No. 16; 1921–1932	Succeeded by Tor Andræ
Awards and achievements
Preceded by Frank B. Kellogg	Laureate of the Nobel Peace Prize; 1930	Succeeded by Nicholas Murray Butler and Jane Addams
