= Varberg Church =

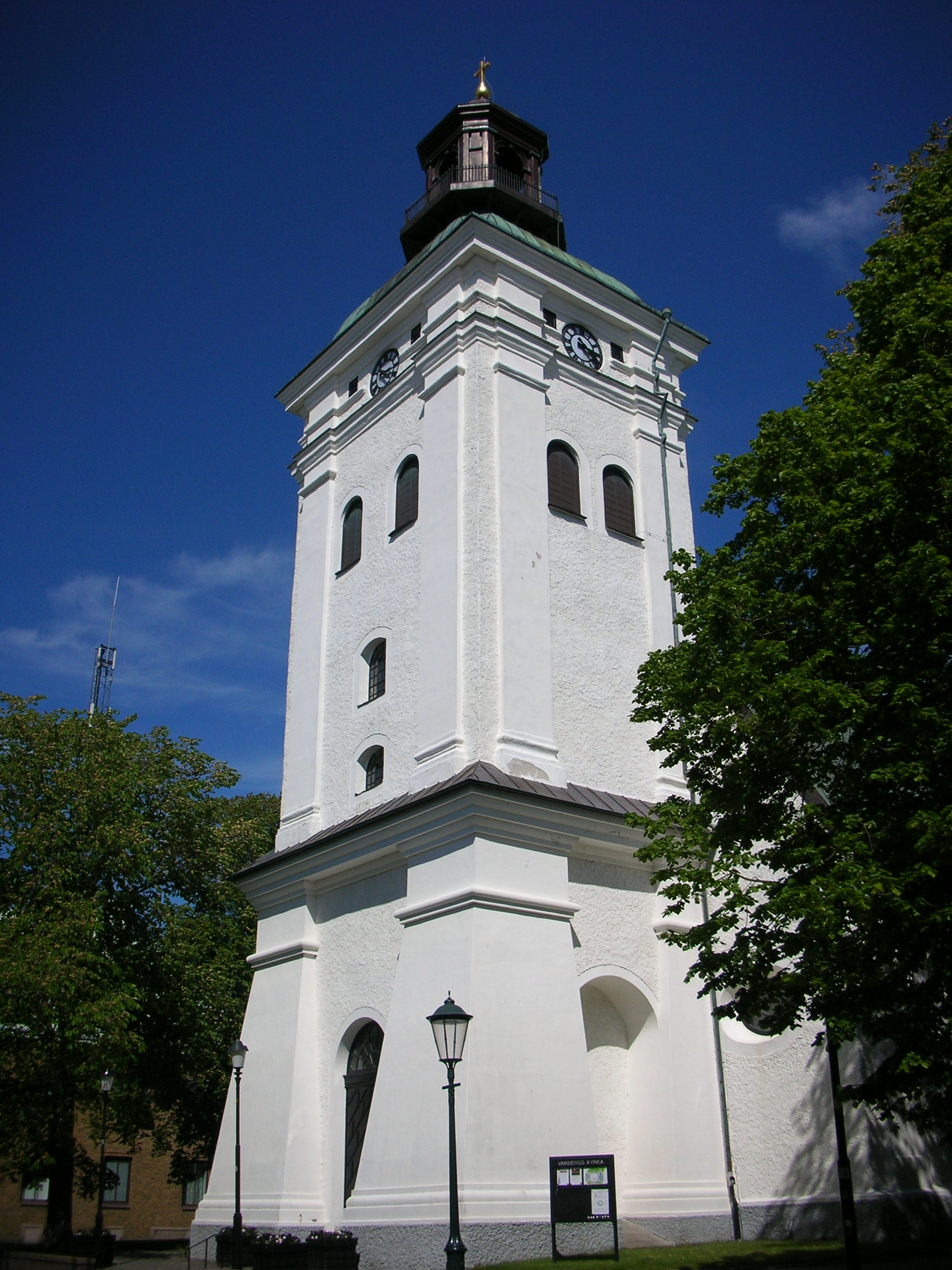
- Varberg Church
- 57°6′21.5″N 12°15′2″E
- Location: Varberg
- Country: Weden
- Denomination: Church of Sweden

History
- Consecrated: 1771

Administration
- Province: Halland County
- Diocese: Gothenburg

Varberg Church (Swedish: Varbergs kyrka) is situated at the marketplace in Varberg, Halland County, Sweden. The church was completed in 1772, as a replacement of an elder church from 1687 that was destroyed in a fire on 18 May 1767.

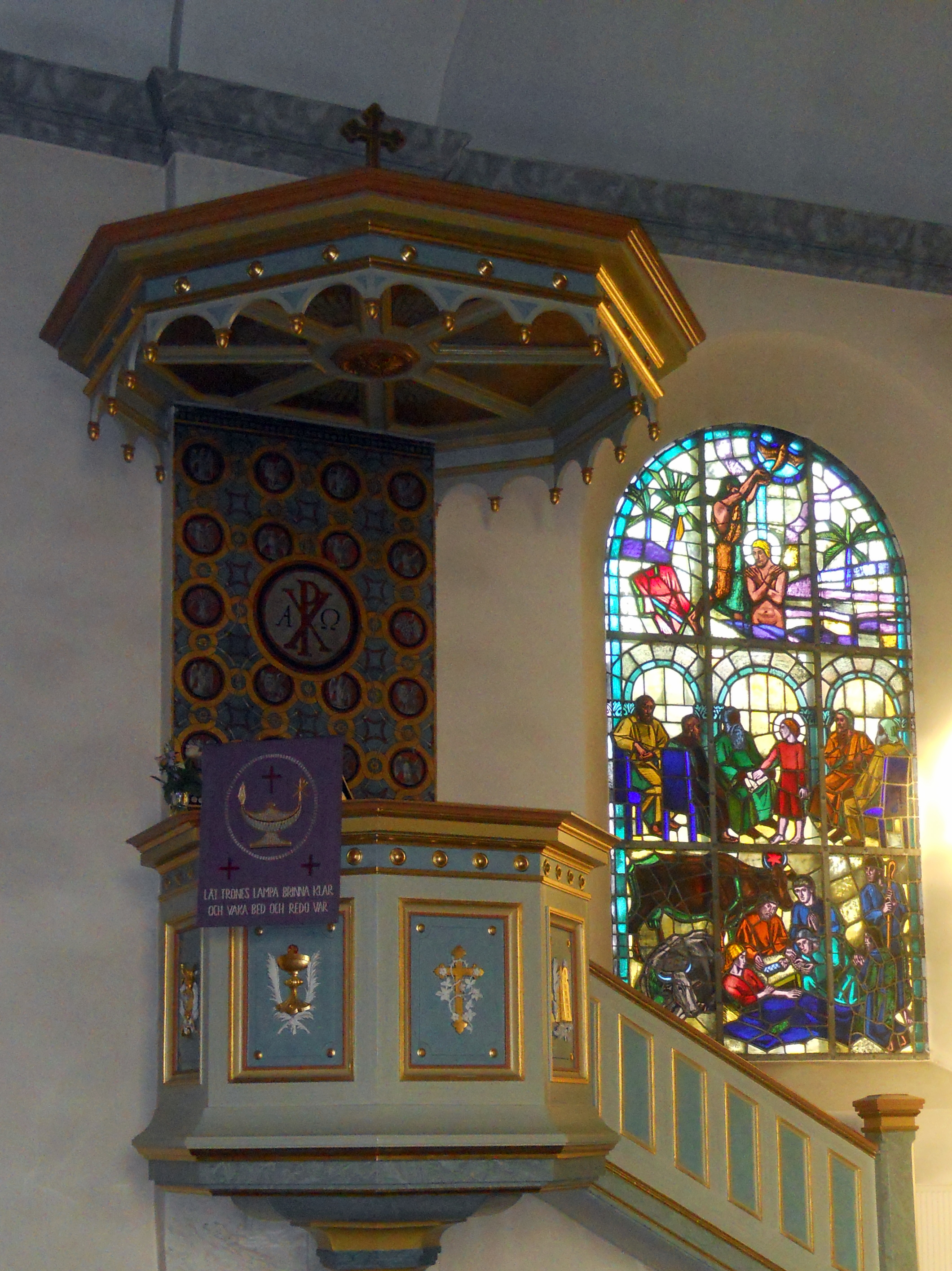
Pulpit

The interior of the church is neoclassical. Mostly of it is from the 19th century. The retable is from 1816. The pulpit was set in during a restoration of the church in 1890–1891. The wooden baptismal font has seven edges. It was made from oak in the 17th century. It comes from an elder church that was destroyed in a fire on 12 August 1666. At this time, the city of Varberg was situated in an area called Platsarna. The city was moved to its current location after the fire in 1666.

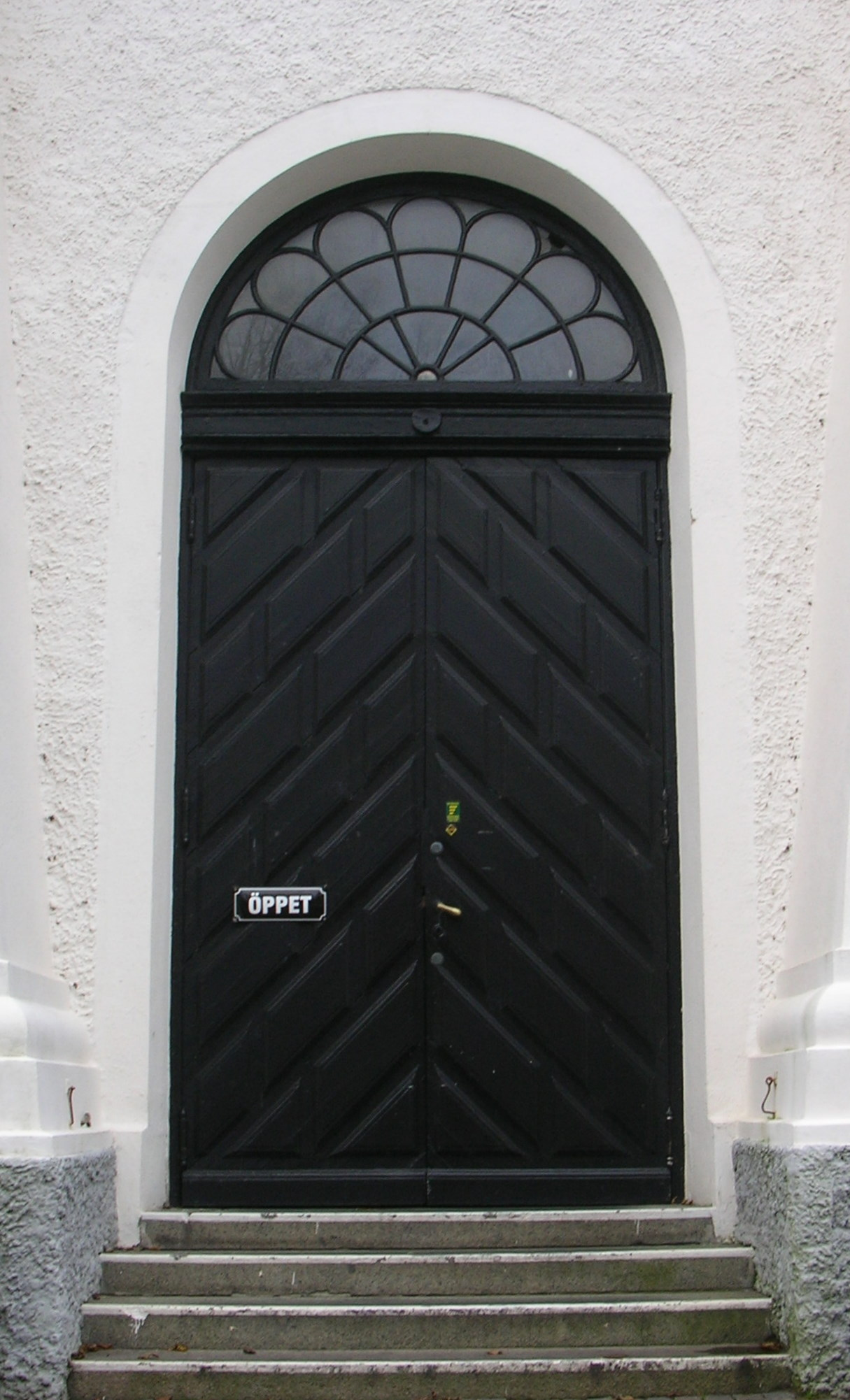
Door

A sacristy was built to the north in 1961.

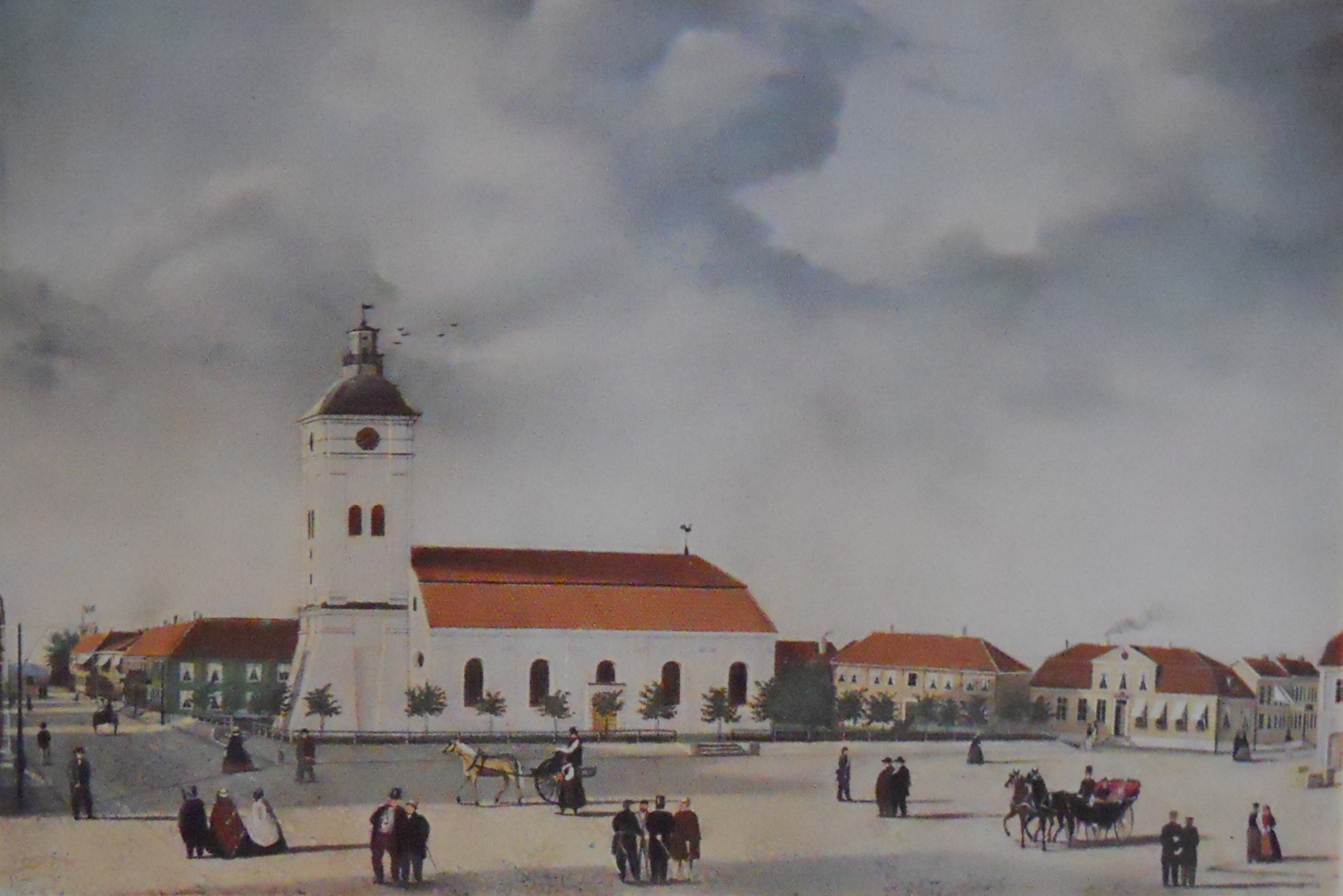
Oil painting by Birger Sjöberg

It is the parish church of Varberg Parish, and the eldest and biggest one of the four churches in the parish.
