= Junker Party =

1850s Swedish political association

The Junker Party (Swedish: Junkerpartiet) was a grouping in Swedish politics in the 1850s, although it never constituted an actual party. The Junkers were conservative nobles who, in opposition to August von Hartmansdorff, wished to maintain the privileges of the nobility. In other respects, the Junkers represented a conservative political stance, for example on the issue of representation – they sought to maintain the Riksdag of the Estates as opposed to forming a parliamentary system of government, the Riksdag. To this end they aligned themselves with wealthy farmers. However, the party's conservative stance had some exceptions regarding customs policy, where they were more free-trade oriented. Crown Prince Charles, later Charles XV, drew his closest advisors from the Junker Party, his connection "making him suspect among liberals".

The first leader of the Junker Party was Otto Palmstierna, soon replaced by Henning Hamilton. Other notable supporters include Gustaf Lagerbjelke, Gillis Bildt and Erik Josias Sparre.

== See also ==
- Estates of the Realm
- History of the Riksdag
- Politics of Sweden
