= Lord Marshal (Sweden) =

Lantmarskalk, (English: Lord Marshal; German: Lantmarschall) was the title of one of the speakers of the Swedish Riksdag of the Estates, from 1627 to 1866 and of the Diet of Grand Duchy of Finland from 1809 to 1906. The Lantmarskalk was appointed by the Estate of the Nobles and also served as its speaker (talman). The Lantmarskalk should not be confused with the Riksmarsk (Lord High Constable of Sweden) or the Riksmarskalk (Marshal of the Realm), which were Great Officers of the Realm and royal appointees.

Between approximately 1720 and 1772 two parties Hats and Caps were active during a short period of parliamentary rule, referred to as the age of liberty.

== List of office holders ==
- Per Brahe (1629)
- Johan Pontusson De la Gardie (1630)
- Henrik Fleming (1643–1644)
- Bengt Skytte (1647)
- Svante Larsson Sparre (1649–1651)
- Christer Bonde (1652)
- Johan Gyllenstierna (1668)
- Claes Fleming (1680)
- Fabian Wrede (1682)
- Erik Lindschöld (1686)
- Jacob Gyllenborg (1693)
- Per Ribbing (1719)
- Arvid Horn, Caps (1720, 1726, 1731)
- Swen Lagerberg, Caps (1723)
- Carl Gustaf Tessin, Hats (1738–1739)
- Mattias Alexander von Ungern-Sternberg, Caps (1742, 1746)
- Henning Gyllenborg, Hats (1751–1752)
- Axel von Fersen, senior, Hats (1755–1756, 1760–1762, 1769–1770)
- Thure Gustaf Rudbeck, Caps (1765)
- Eric Ruuth (1792)
- Magnus Fredrik Brahe (1800)
- Johan Christopher Toll (1800)
- Carl Carlsson Mörner (1815)
- Carl De Geer (1823, 1828–1830)
- Jacob De la Gardie (1834–1835)
- Henning Hamilton (1848, 1853–1854, 1856–1858)
- Gustaf Lagerbjelke (1862–1863, 1865–1866)

== See also ==
- Lantmarskalks of the Finnish House of Nobility
- Speaker of the Riksdag
- Constitution of Sweden
- History of Sweden
