= World Conference of Life and Work =

The World Conference of Life and Work (Swedish: Stora ekumeniska mötet) was held on the initiative of Church of Sweden archbishop Nathan Söderblom in Stockholm, Sweden 1925 to discuss social cooperation. Attending the meeting were most major Christian denominations, though the Catholic Church and the Pentecostal movement did not attend.

Prior to the conference, Söderblom had put efforts into ecumenical discussions among churches, and peace talks during World War I. Among these discussions was the World Alliance for Promoting Friendship among the Churches in 1919, which was the first time Christians from both sides of the war met again. Söderblom arranged the World Conference of Life and Work with hopes that it would result in an ecumenical council of churches and that "the fatherhood of God and the brotherhood of all peoples will become more completely realized through the church of Christ". Some of the topics discussed were the church's role in God's plan for the world, economic, industrial, social and moral problems, international relations and co-operation between churches. It was intended that theological differences be kept out with the slogan "Doctrine divides, while service unites", which turned out to be hard to achieve. The conference was followed by other ecumenical activities, such as the Faith and Order Conference in Lausanne, Switzerland in 1927, which Söderblom's friend, the Episcopal bishop Charles Brent had been instrumental in arranging. The movement out of the Faith and Order Conference and the World Conference of Life and Work later formed the World Council of Churches in 1948.

== See also ==
- World Council of Churches
- Nathan Söderblom
- Ecumenism
