= Johan August Ekman =

Archbishop of Uppsala (1845–1913)

The Most Reverend Johan August Ekman
- Archbishop of Uppsala; Primate of Sweden
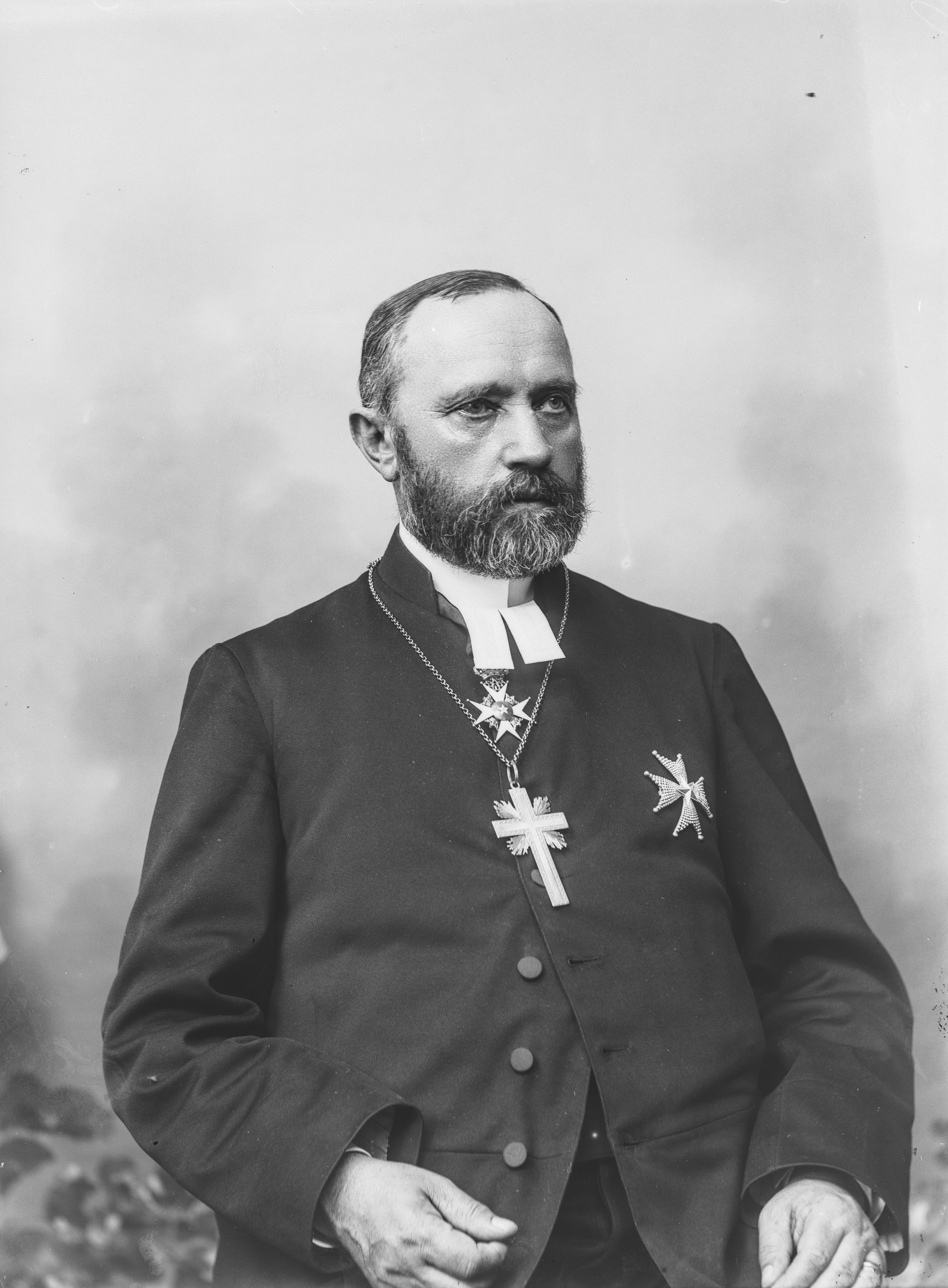
- Church: Church of Sweden
- Archdiocese: Uppsala
- Appointed: 1900
- In office: 1900–1913
- Predecessor: Anton Niklas Sundberg
- Successor: Nathan Söderblom

Orders
- Ordination: 13 January 1873
- Consecration: 28 August 1898 by Anton Niklas Sundberg
- Rank: Archbishop

Personal details
- Born: 26 November 1845 Hjälstad, Sweden
- Died: 30 November 1913 (aged 68) Uppsala, Sweden
- Buried: Uppsala gamla kyrkogård
- Spouse: Hilma Ingeborg Petersson

Johan August Ekman (26 November 1845, Hjälstad - 1913) was Archbishop of Uppsala, Sweden, 1900–1913.

== Biography ==
Johan Ekman was the son of Olof Ekman and Maria, born Johansdotter. He was a student of theology at the University of Uppsala receiving his Licentiate of Theology in 1870 and was ordained into the priesthood in 1873. He earned his Bachelor of Theology (teol. kand.) in 1876. He became a professor of theology at Uppsala University in 1887 and received his Doctor of Theology (dr. theol.) in 1893. Thereafter he worked as a vicar and held other church offices.

He was elected Bishop of the Diocese of Västerås in 1898; and appointed Archbishop of Uppsala in 1900. Ekman played a decisive role in the development of the Lay ecclesial ministry. In 1903, the General Swedish clergy association (Allmänna svenska prästföreningen) was founded and in 1910 the Church of Sweden National Board for Parish Life (Svenska kyrkans diakonistyrelse).

== Selected works ==
- The origins of Christian Priesthood (1882)
- Miracles and Spiritual Inspirations (1883)
- The Naturalistic Paganism (1886-1888)

== Other sources ==
- Santell, Fredrik (2016) Svenska kyrkans diakonistyrelse: Tillflöden och tillkomst, organisation och verksamhet intill 1938 (Uppsala University) ISBN 978-91-554-9713-2

Preceded by Anton Niklas Sundberg	Archbishop of Uppsala; 1900–1913	Succeeded by Nathan Söderblom
