= Fredrik von Essen =

Swedish politician (1831–1921)

His Excellency Fredrik von Essen
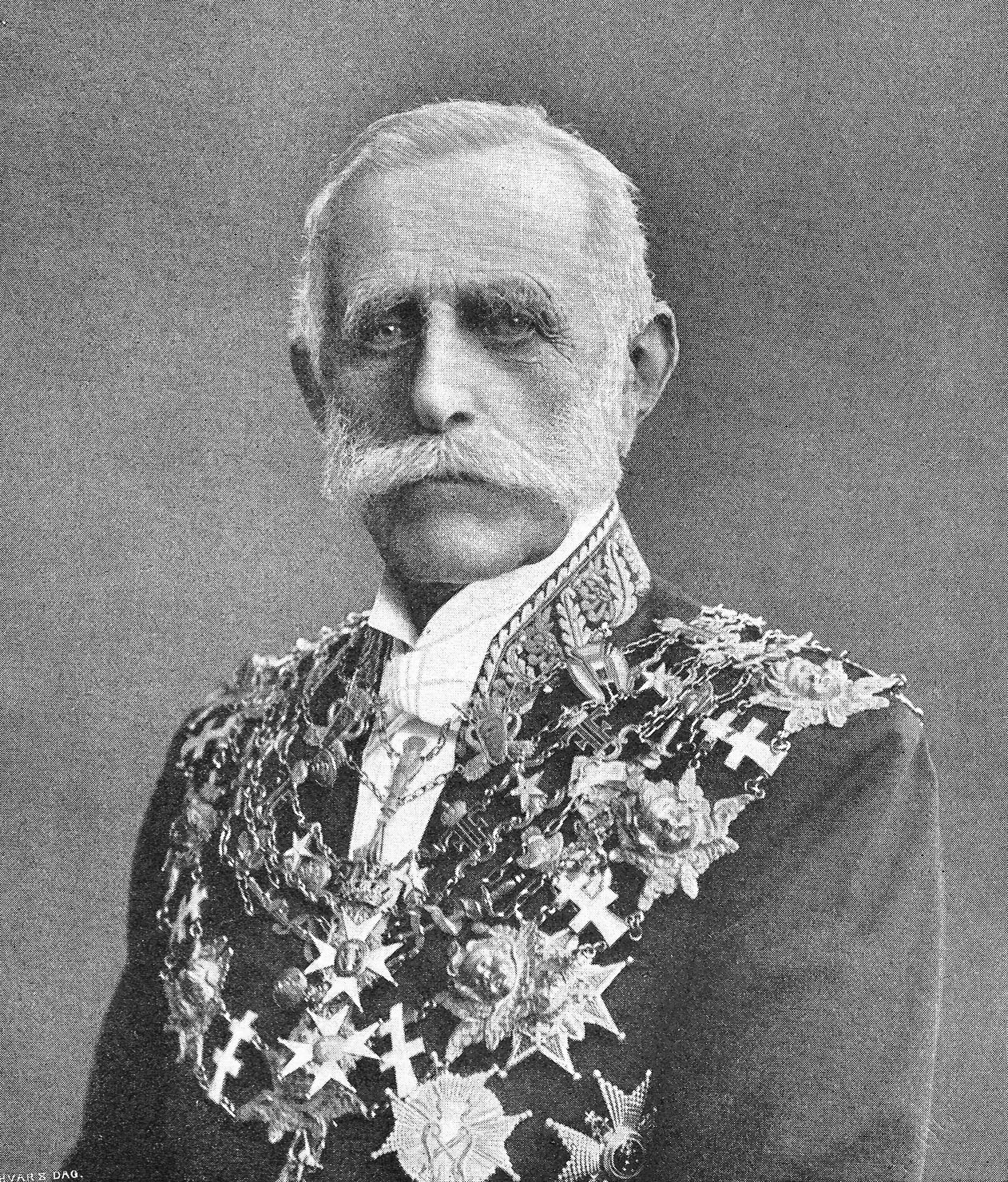
- Portrait, 1906

Minister for Finance
- In office 6 February 1888 – 6 November 1894
- Prime Minister: Gillis Bildt; Gustaf Åkerhielm; Erik Gustaf Boström
- Preceded by: Claës Gustaf Adolf Tamm
- Succeeded by: Erik Gustaf Boström

Marshal of the Realm
- In office 6 November 1894 – 1911
- Monarchs: Oscar II; Gustaf V
- Preceded by: Gillis Bildt
- Succeeded by: Ludvig Douglas

Personal details
- Born: 30 July 1831 Hömb socken, Sweden
- Died: 3 October 1921 (aged 90) Stockholm, Sweden
- Party: Protectionist

Baron Fredrik von Essen (30 July 1831 – 3 October 1921) was a Swedish politician, friherre, Marshal of the Realm and lord of Kavlås Castle.

Von Essen was member of the House of knights and nobility in the Riksdag of the Estates 1862–1863 and 1865–1866, and member of the Riksdag's first chamber (Första kammaren) 1867–1874 and 1877–1906. He became finance minister in 1888, serving under Prime Minister Gillis Bildt and Gustaf Åkerhielm (1889–1891) and Erik Gustaf Boström until 1894. In 1894 he was appointed Marshal of the Realm by King Oscar II and served until 1911. He was chairman of the Executive Committee for the Swedish Iron-Clad Fellowship.

== Family ==
Fredrik von Essen was the son of major general Fredrik Ulrik von Essen and Anna Sofia Gyllenhaal, and a second cousin of Anders Leonard Gyllenhaal, ancestor of the American branch of the Gyllenhaal family and great grandfather of Jake Gyllenhaal. He married Ebba Aurora Brahe (1838–1924), daughter of Count Nils Fredrik Brahe (1812–1850) and Countess Hedvig Elisabet Maria Amalia Piper, at Skokloster Castle 14 July 1859. Their children Vera Anna Elisabet (born 1860), Ebba Margareta (born 1866), Carl Magnus (born 1873), and Wilhelm (born 1879).

== Honours ==
Swedish decorations

- Sweden: Knight of the Order of the Seraphim
- Sweden: Grand Cross of the Order of the Sword
- Sweden: Grand Cross of the Order of the Polar Star
- Sweden: Grand Cross of the Order of Vasa

Foreign decorations

- Russian Empire: Knight of the Order of St. Andrew
- Prussia: Knight of the Order of the Black Eagle
- Denmark: Knight of the Order of the Elephant
- Denmark: Knight of the Order of the Dannebrog
- France: Grand Cross of the Legion of Honor
- Belgium: Knight Grand Cordon of the Order of Leopold
- Great Britain: Honorary Knight Grand Cross of the Royal Victorian Order
- Norway: Commander with Star of the Order of St. Olav

Court offices
Preceded by Gillis Bildt	Marshal of the Realm; 1894–1911	Succeeded by Ludvig Douglas
Professional and academic associations
Preceded by Oscar Björnstjerna	Chairman of the Directorate of the Swedish Nobility Foundation; 1899–1907	Succeeded by Baron Hjalmar Palmstierna
