= Henry Allard =

Swedish politician

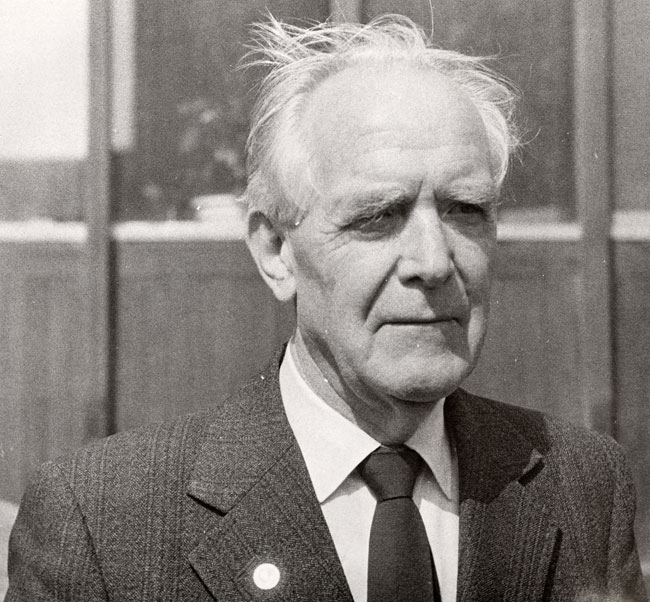
- Allard in May 1984

Speaker of the Riksdag
- In office 15 January 1971 – 1 October 1979
- Monarchs: Gustav VI Adolf; Carl XVI Gustaf
- Succeeded by: Ingemund Bengtsson

Member of the Riksdag
- In office 1943–1979

Personal details
- Born: Karl Åke Henry Allard; 21 November 1911 Örebro, Sweden
- Died: 23 October 1996 (aged 84) Örebro, Sweden
- Party: Social Democratic
- Relatives: Hjalmar Allard (father); Nelly Allard (mother); Folke Allard (brother); Markus Allard (grandson)

Karl Åke Henry Allard (21 November 1911 – 23 October 1996) was a Swedish politician (Social Democrat). He was a member of the Riksdag from 1943 until 1979. He was the Speaker of the Riksdag's second chamber 1969–1970, and became the first speaker of the unicameral Riksdag in 1971, a post he held until 1979.

His grandson Markus Allard is the founder and longtime leader of the local populist big-tent Örebro Party.

Preceded by Fridolf Thapper	Speaker of the Riksdag's Second Chamber; 1969-1970	Succeeded by None
Preceded by none	Speaker of the Riksdag; 1971-1979	Succeeded by Ingemund Bengtsson
