= Gillis Bildt =

Prime Minister of Sweden from 1888 to 1889

His Excellency Gillis Bildt
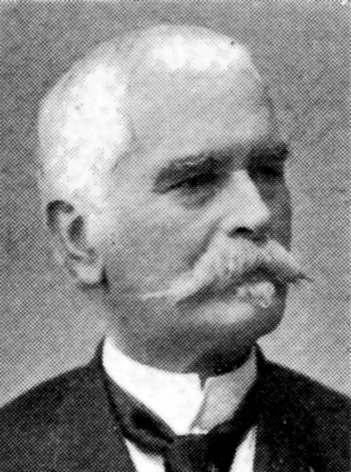

Prime Minister of Sweden
- In office 6 February 1888 – 12 October 1889
- Monarch: Oscar II
- Preceded by: Robert Themptander
- Succeeded by: Gustaf Åkerhielm

31st Marshal of the Realm
- In office 1886–1894
- Monarch: Oscar II
- Preceded by: Gustaf Adolf Vive Sparre
- Succeeded by: Fredrik von Essen

Personal details
- Born: Didrik Anders Gillis Bildt; 16 October 1820 Gothenburg, Sweden
- Died: 22 October 1894 (aged 74) Stockholm, Sweden
- Resting place: Solna cemetery
- Party: Independent conservative
- Spouse: Lucile Rosalie Dufva
- Relations: Carl Bildt (great-great-grandson)
- Children: Adèle Elisabeth, Carl Nils Daniel, Knut Gillis Bildt
- Parent(s): Daniel Fredrik Bildt; Christina Elisabeth (née Fröding)
- Education: Royal War Academy
- Occupation: Military officer

Military service
- Branch/service: Swedish Army
- Years of service: 1837–1890
- Rank: Lieutenant General
- Commands: Gotland National Conscription

Baron Didrik Anders Gillis Bildt (16 October 1820 – 22 October 1894) was a Swedish politician and military officer who served as Prime Minister of Sweden from 1888 to 1889. As widely respected general, he was appointed head of government by King Oscar II during a tense political deadlock regarding protectionist tariff policy. He is the great-great-grandfather of Carl Bildt, prime minister from 1991 to 1994.

== Family ==
Gillis Bildt was born on 16 October 1820 in Gothenburg, Sweden, a son of Lieutenant Colonel Daniel Fredrik Bildt and his wife Christina Elisabeth Fröding. His father died seven years later, in 1827. His mother lived until 1858.

In 1848 Gillis married Lucile Rosalie Dufva. They had three children: Adéle Elisabeth Bildt (1849–1914), Carl Nils Daniel Bildt (1850–1931), and Knut Gillis Bildt (1854–1927).

Bildt's great-great-grandson Carl Bildt (born 1949) became Prime Minister of Sweden (1991–1994) and was also High Representative for Bosnia and Herzegovina (1995–1997). Carl Bildt is a great-grandson of Knut Gillis Bildt.

== Career ==
=== Military officer ===
Gillis Bildt made a career in the military as an artillery officer, rising eventually to lieutenant general.

He passed out from the Royal War Academy in Stockholm in 1837 and was assigned to Göta Artillery Regiment. He completed his higher education in 1842 in Marieberg, where he had come to the attention of Crown Prince Oscar (later King Oscar I) for his diligence and competence. After graduation he worked as a mathematics tutor for several years, as well as continuing his military career and entering the Riksdag in 1847.

"Bildt was not a member of the wealthy or the upper nobility”, chronicles the writer Harald Wieselgren. "His personality alone gave him a lever up in the world. The competent artillery officer, the charming cavalier, the exemplary young man were combined in the persona of Bildt".

While a lieutenant he was appointed as an aide-de-camp to King Oscar I in 1851. He advanced to major (1854), lieutenant colonel (1856), colonel (1858). In 1859 he became major general and was chosen by King Karl XV to be his first aide-de-camp. Finally in 1875 he was promoted to lieutenant general.

=== Governor ===
Bildt's early political titles included Governor of Gotland 1858–1862 and Governor of Stockholm 1862–1874.

A major issue for Bildt was campaigning in defence of the railways, particularly routes he considered of military and commercial value to Stockholm. He garnered support throughout the city – in the Riksdag, City Council, stock exchange and among the citizens. He was also a shareholder and board member in the company seeking to operate a railway between Stockholm and the Vestmanland mines.

Agriculture was another subject close to his heart. In 1850 he had called it "our country's mightiest interest". More diplomatic was his statement in 1869:

"I believe that much can be done to benefit our agriculture, but not by means of more or less public money. For who should give up their allocation, if not the non-farm sector; alas they are not in a position to do without".

In 1864 Bildt was made a friherre (baron).

=== Parliamentarian ===
Bildt was a Member of the Riksdag of the Estates and Riksdag (Sweden's legislature) from 1847 to 1874 and 1887 to 1894. From 1867, when the Riksdag became bicameral, Bildt sat in the Upper House (Första kammaren).

As a representative in the House of Nobility, which was the most august Riksdag Estate until 1866, Bildt was aligned with the Junker Party. The Junker Party was a group of conservative free-market nobles (related term: Prussian Junkers).

Bildt spoke out on social policy issues. One was the development of health care services. Another concerned the inadequate schooling for women. "It is an established fact", he declared in a speech in 1859, "that the development of our nation depends on the education of women".

During 1848–1860 he was a reporter to the Committee of Supply. He was a strong supporter of Louis De Geer's 1863 electoral reform bill and the introduction of popular suffrage. Bildt was a skillful debater who recognized the legitimate arguments against the reform. He sought to build a consensus rather than engage in the politics of division. Finally, with two of the four estates on side and with a large public backing, he set about overcoming the House of Nobility's inevitable opposition to its own dissolution. Given the popular support for the reform, Governor Bildt had troops ready to maintain order in the capital, in the event of the bill being blocked. But the nervousness turned to rejoicing as the bill was accepted, finally receiving Royal assent on 22 January 1866 by King Karl XV. The unicameral legislature, representing the four estates, was replaced with a bicameral parliament, consisting of an Upper House of appointed members (Första kammaren) and a numerically superior and popularly elected Lower House (Andra kammaren). A committee was set up to define the procedures for the new Riksdag. Bildt was elected onto this committee with more votes than any other candidate.

Bildt was also active in the new Riksdag from 1867. In the Defence Committee as in the chamber he campaigned to maintain the necessary balance and preparedness of army units. Bildt also continued his work for social justice, speaking out in favour of extending citizenship to non-members of the Church of Sweden and giving married women legal competence over their own affairs.

During the period 1874–1886 Bildt was Sweden's ambassador in Berlin (see below). In 1886, he became Marshal of the Realm.

His (re-)appointment in 1887 to the Upper House by the protectionist representatives on the Stockholm City Council was against the wishes of King Oscar II. The king did not want a close friend of the royal family involved in party politics and opposing the incumbent pro free-trade government. Bildt promised the king not to represent a political party and remained an independent conservative. However Bildt did participate in meetings with the protectionist group in the House. Bildt himself was moderately protectionist.

=== Ambassador ===
As Swedish ambassador in Germany 1874–1886, Bildt strengthened ties between Sweden and the new German Empire, negotiating bilateral agreements on matters such as post, telegraph, extradition and sailors.

During his time in Germany Bildt witnessed the introduction by Otto von Bismarck of the agrarian protectionist system.

In Sweden during this period the Protectionist Party had been established, gaining ground in 1885–1886 due to downward price pressure on Swedish crops, especially barley. Demands for duties on imported foodstuffs to benefit Swedish farmers were opposed by pro free-trade prime minister Robert Themptander. Events took an unexpected turn. The disqualification of Stockholm's 22 pro free-trade members of the democratically elected Lower House (Andra kammaren) on a technicality (one member's non-payment of 11.58 SEK in taxes a few years previously) and the appointment, in their place, of 22 protectionist members tipped the balance of power and brought about Themptander's resignation, opening the door for a new leader.

=== Prime minister ===
Gillis Bildt was appointed prime minister by King Oscar II on 6 February 1888. With his first-hand experience of Germany's new agrarian protectionist system and his own protectionist sympathies he was considered an ideal successor. Archbishop Anton Niklas Sundberg, former speaker in both houses, had supposedly been offered the premiership, but turned it down.

With the Protectionists now having control of the Lower House and numerical superiority in joint votes with the Upper House, the political direction was clear. In the interest of reconciliation, the King set Bildt the task of leading a gradual shift from the economically liberal politics of Louis De Geer towards the more protectionist system that was becoming increasingly popular throughout Europe.

Bildt's cabinet was a mix of ministers from the pro-free trade and pro-protectionist camps. Subsequent cabinet changes shifted the balance further towards protectionism. While the new taxes meant citizens paying more for food and tools, the state's finances improved in Sweden, as elsewhere in Europe. In Sweden the money was used to reduce the budget deficit, build railways and improve the country's defences.

Bildt's achievements during his rise to the premiership stand out more than his time at the top. After his years abroad, the aging Bildt was considered out of touch with the political momentum of the time.

Bildt resigned on 12 October 1889, after 20 months in office. The reasons for his resignation are said to be:

- His protectionist system had been established.
- He was finding it increasingly difficult to realize his goal, presented in his address at the opening of parliament, of "a society at ease with itself".

Gillis Bildt died on 22 October 1894 at the Royal Palace in Stockholm, aged 74.

The title Friherre Bildt was inherited by the elder of his two sons, Carl Nils Daniel Bildt (1850–1931).

== See also ==
- Free trade debate
- Pros and cons of democracy
- Australia's Protectionist Party and Free Trade Party in the 1880s

Political offices
Preceded by Robert Themptander	Prime Minister of Sweden; 6 February 1888 – 12 October 1889	Succeeded by Gustaf Åkerhielm
