= Pehr von Ehrenheim =

Swedish politician (1823–1918)

Pehr Jacob von Ehrenheim (4 August 1823–20 March 1918) was a Swedish statesman who served as Speaker of the First Chamber from 1891 to 1895. He led the "Ehrenheim Party" from 1873 to 1887 and represented Uppsala in the First Chamber of the Riksdag from 1867 to 1902. He previously represented Swedish nobility in the Riksdag of the Estates from 1850 to 1866.

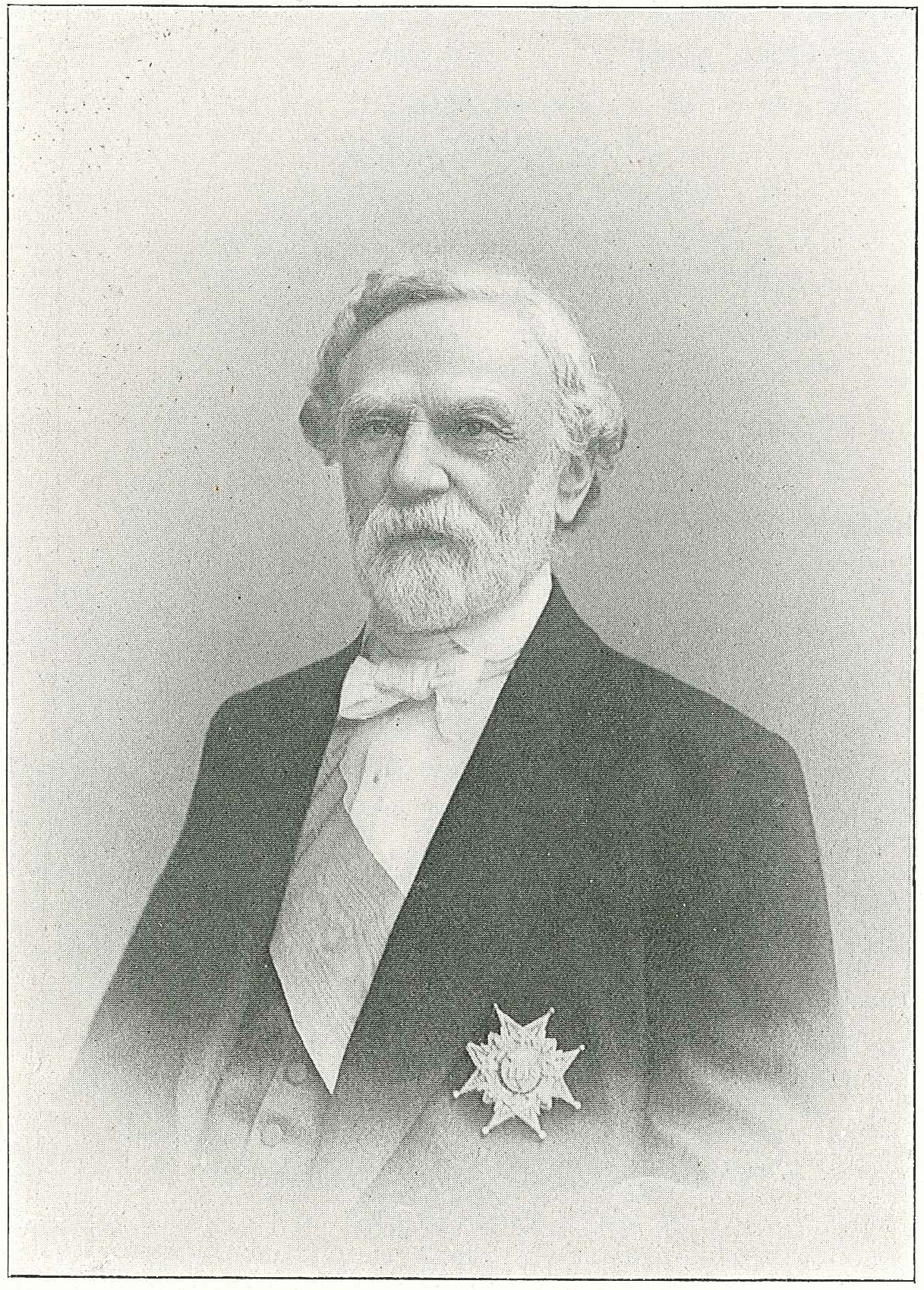
The portrait of Pehr von Ehrenheim
