= Gustaf Åkerhielm =

Swedish politician, baron and landowner

His Excellency The High Well-born Baron Gustaf Åkerhielm
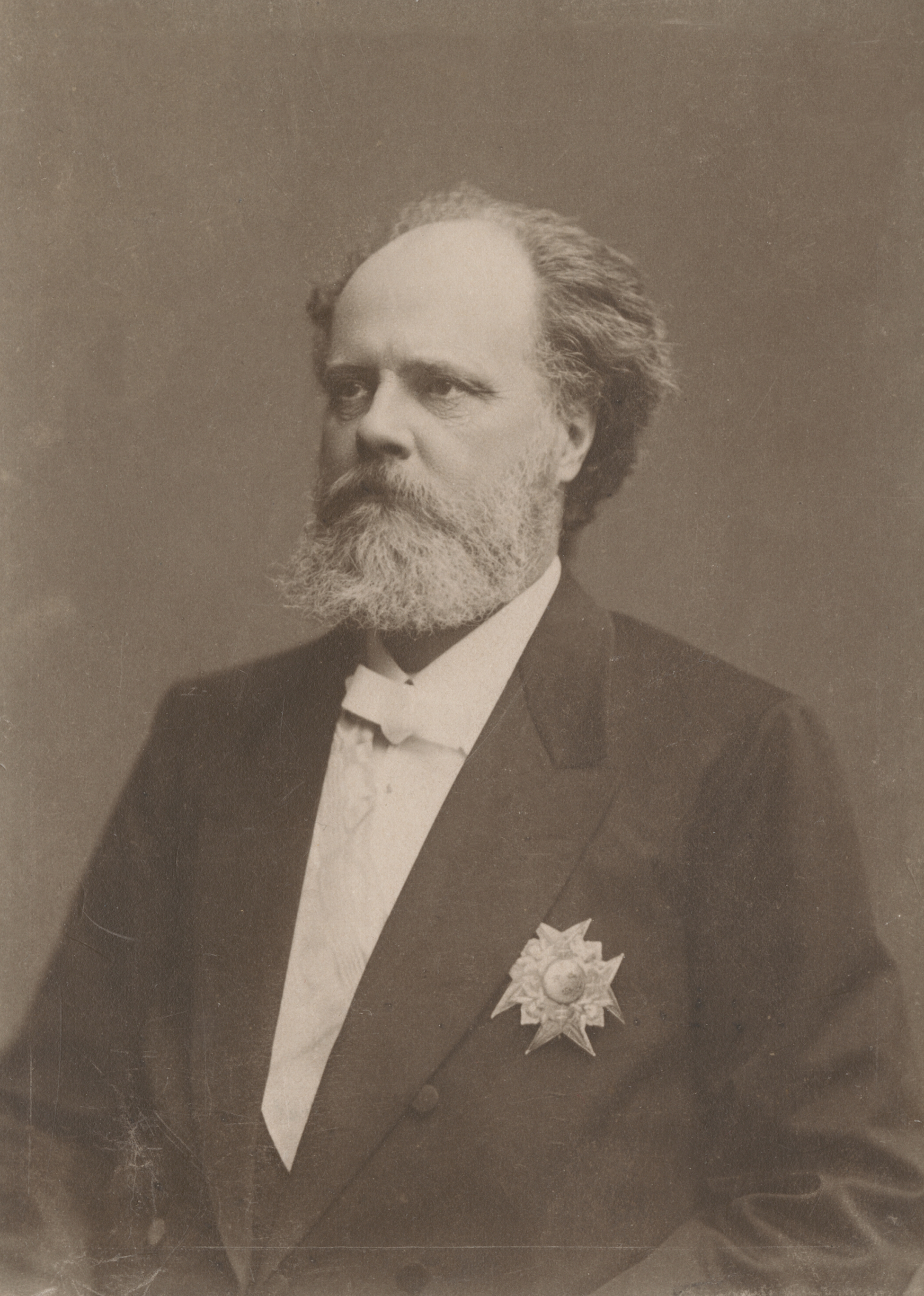
- Åkerhielm, c. 1880–1890

Prime Minister of Sweden
- In office 12 October 1889 – 10 July 1891
- Monarch: Oscar II
- Preceded by: Gillis Bildt
- Succeeded by: Erik Gustaf Boström

Personal details
- Born: Johan Gustaf Nils Samuel Åkerhielm af Margaretelund; 24 June 1833 Stockholm, Sweden
- Died: 2 April 1900 (aged 66) Stockholm, Sweden
- Party: Protectionist Majority Party
- Spouse: Ebba Åkerhielm (m. 1860)
- Children: 3
- Education: Uppsala University

Baron Johan Gustaf Nils Samuel Åkerhielm af Margaretelund (24 June 1833 – 2 April 1900) was a Swedish politician who served as Prime Minister of Sweden from 1889 to 1891. He previously served as Finance Minister from 1874 to 1875 and briefly as Foreign Minister in 1889. He represented Swedish nobility in the Riksdag of the Estates from 1859 to 1866 and was a member of the Riksdag’s lower house from 1870 until his death in 1900.

He was married to Ulrika Gyldenstolpe in 1860, with whom he had three children.

== Biography ==
Gustaf Åkerhielm was born in Stockholm, son of Swedish cabinet member Gustaf Fredrik Åkerhielm and his wife, Elisabeth Sophia Anker. After diplomatic service in Saint Petersburg and Copenhagen, he had a successful political career, where he held a long succession of different positions in the government from minister of finance from 1874 to 1875. In 1889 he was appointed to the position of minister for foreign affairs by Gillis Bildt, and in October of the same year, he became the new prime minister of Sweden.

Åkerhielm sought to solve military defense issues, but his efforts were blocked because of the opposition in the Lower House of the Swedish Parliament. However, he was able to remain in power due to support he had in the Upper House. In 1891, he was nevertheless forced to resign after a careless reply to a question regarding defense, which was interpreted as a war-like threat against Norway. The exact wording of his statement was unclear, but those who were present said the statement was, more or less, that "a new order for the Army will allow us to speak Swedish with Norwegians."

He died on 2 April 1900 in Stockholm.

Political offices
Preceded by Gillis Bildt	Prime Minister of Sweden; 12 October 1889 –10 July 1891	Succeeded by Erik Gustaf Boström
