= Henning Hamilton =

Swedish count and civil servant (1814–1886)

Count Henning Ludvig Hugo Hamilton
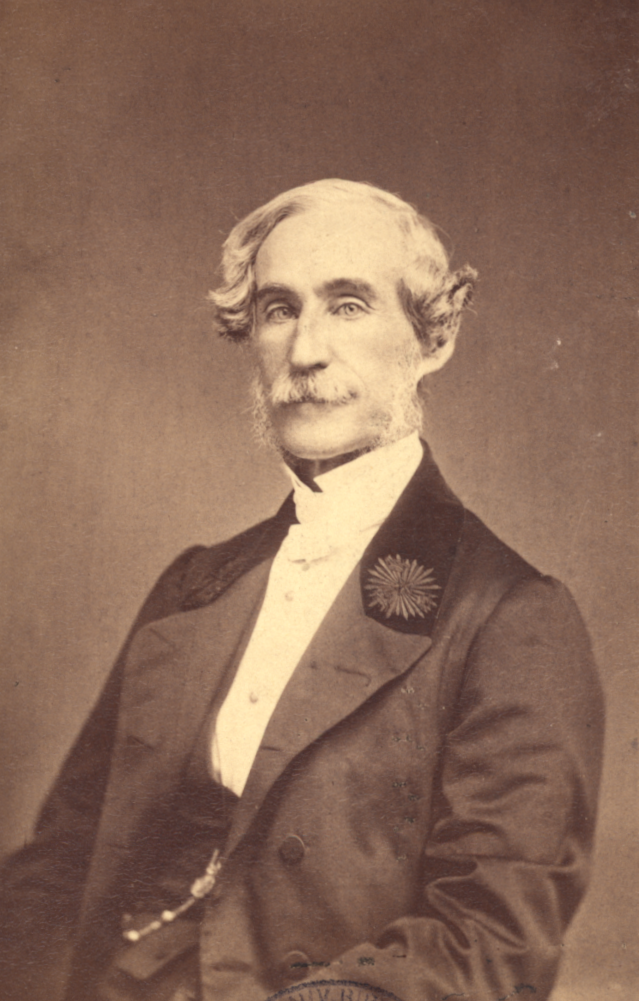
- Born: 16 January 1814; Stockholm, Sweden
- Died: 15 January 1886 (aged 71); Amélie-les-Bains, France
- Education: Uppsala University
- Occupations: Count, politician, government official, author
- Political party: Junker Party
- Movement: Conservative

Count Henning Ludvig Hugo Hamilton (16 January 1814 – 15 January 1886) was a Swedish statesman, diplomat, and writer. Hamilton initially represented Swedish nobility in the Riksdag of the Estates from 1840 to 1866, and later Södermanland County from 1867 to 1881. His father was Gustaf Wathier Hamilton.

== Career ==
Born in Stockholm, Hamilton received his education at Uppsala University and became second lieutenant of the Svea Artillery Regiment in 1829. After a study trip to the continent in 1835, he worked as a teacher of topography and fortification in 1837 at the military academy (today's Military Academy Karlberg), taught military tactics and regulations at the school for line officers in Stockholm from 1837 to 1843 and was a lieutenant in the Topographical Corps from 1839 and its captain from 1845. From 1839 to 1844, he was secretary of the Academy of War Sciences and was chamberlain first to Crown Princess Josephine (1841–1843), then to Princes Charles and Gustaf during their studies in Uppsala in 1844–1845. In 1847, he accompanied the royals on their travels in Denmark and Germany and in the same year became a major in the army and chief of staff of the Life Guards and also accompanied the crown prince on his engagement trip to the Netherlands.

Hamilton was interested in politics from a young age, and from 1840 he took part in the Riksdag of the Estates, as chairman of the Appropriations Committee (1840 and 1847), as a member of the State Committee (1844) and of the Representation Committee appointed by His Majesty (1846–1847). In 1850, Hamilton was appointed lieutenant colonel in the army, and in 1851 he was commissioned and in 1852 appointed county governor of Östergötland County. When Gustaf Sparre was appointed Prime Minister for Justice in April 1848, Hamilton took his place as lord marshal for the remainder of the Riksdag. With sharpness and diligence, Hamilton led the conservative opposition to the government's representation proposal alongside August von Hartmansdorff in the following parliaments. When Harmansdorff presented his sensational representation proposal at the 1850–1851 Riksdag, it was Hamilton who, on behalf of the Junker Party, pledged his faith and obedience to the old party leader, which led to his political isolation. From 1853 to 1854 and 1856 to 1858, Hamilton was once again lord marshal.

In September 1857, Crown Prince Charles took over the government as Oscar I became increasingly ill. Since his days as tutor to the princes, Hamilton had been close to the crown prince and had tried to curb his eagerness for behind-the-scenes intrigue. One of Crown Prince Charles's first actions was to appoint Hamilton as minister without portfolio on 27 April 1858. When the government was reorganized on 29 January 1859, Hamilton became head of the Ministry of Education and Ecclesiastical Affairs, a post for which his ecclesiastical and political interests made him suitable. As education minister, he However, his position of power in the ministry did not last long. Because of the unlimited trust Hamilton enjoyed with Charles XV and his unwavering loyalty to the king, he also became complicit in the distrust of the king's constant attempts to consolidate power around his own person. Carefully but determinedly, the young Prime Minister for Justice, Louis Gerhard De Geer, assumed more and more power. When great conflict broke out over the Norwegian Storting's demand for the abolition of the office of governor, and Hamilton showed his willingness to give in to the Norwegian demands in accordance with the wishes of Charles XV, his role was over. The Riksdag rejected the king's and Hamilton's policy, and on 2 November 1860 he was forced to resign from the government.

In July 1861, he was appointed Swedish–Norwegian minister in Copenhagen, a difficult post given the threat of Danish-German entanglements and the divided opinion in Sweden about Swedish intervention in the conflict. Here, too, Hamilton stood at the forefront of Charles XV's policy and found both political and moral reasons for an alliance between Sweden and Denmark. However, events in 1863 developed in a way that put the King and Hamilton in sharp opposition to the Swedish Council of State. At the Skodsborg meeting on 22 July, the King promised an alliance treaty, and at the Ulriksdal conference on 8 September, in which Hamilton also participated, the government majority, under De Geer's leadership and despite the king's request for an immediate decision, strongly supported by Hamilton, decided to approve the treaty on the condition that Russia intervened to help Denmark, a condition that could be considered excluded in advance. Hamilton's position was thereby weakened. The November constitution gave the Swedish government reason to openly distance itself from Denmark. Hamilton subsequently requested and received dismissal from his post.

Hamilton's long leave of absence from government service involved no rest from work. After his return to Sweden, he threw himself with eagerness into the preparations for the battle that would decide the fate of the De Geer representation proposal, and published Bidrag till granskningen af K.M:s nådiga proposition... ('Contributions to the examination of K.M.'s gracious proposal...'), one of the most important contributions against the proposal. During the 1865–1866 Riksdag, Hamilton's speeches were, according to De Geer himself, "full of high ideas, logical clarity and dialectical finesse".

In 1866 he was elected to the Swedish National Debt Office and was its chairman from 1867 to 1872; from 1867 to 1881 he was a member of the Första kammaren (lower house) of the Riksdag and in 1877 Speaker of the First Chamber; in 1868, 1873 and 1878 he was a member of the Church Council and in 1868 and 1873 chairman of the Church Law Committee; in 1869, 1872 and 1875 chairman of the Meeting of the Nobility and from 1875 to 1881 of the Chivalry Board. He was also appointed university chancellor for Lund and Uppsala University in 1872. He was also chairman of the committees for the review of the plans for the country's fortresses (1867), for the revision of the 1686 Swedish Church Law (1869–1873) and for the revision of the statutes of the country's public schools (1870), of the board of directors of the General Fire Insurance Board (1870–1881) and of the Göta Canal Board (1856–1862 and 1873–1881), and of the General Mortgage Bank (1875–1881). He was also an elected member of most Swedish learned societies and many foreign ones. From 1839 to 1843 he was secretary of the Royal Swedish Academy of War Sciences, became one of the eighteen members of the Swedish Academy in 1856, and served as its permanent secretary from 1874 to 1881. In 1860 he was elected member number 548 of the Royal Swedish Academy of Sciences. Hamilton received honorary doctorates from Lund University (1868) and the University of Copenhagen (1879). On 28 January 1854 he was knighted into the Order of Charles XIII. He was also the permanent secretary of the Swedish Academy from 1874 to 1881.

Hamilton was active in the temperance movement, and was a member of Svenska nykterhetssällskapet (the Swedish Temperance Society), serving as its chairman. During his term as minister of education, he also supported the organization politically.

His parliamentary eloquence was considerable. His political character was aristocratic, conservative and strongly pro-royal. In the 1865 Riksdag, he was a leading opponent of the reform to a parliamentary system of government.

== Hamilton scandal ==
In 1881 Hamilton was caught embezzling very large sums of money – at the time 800,000 Swedish kronor (estimated at 80 million SEK in 2000 value), including around 285,000 SEK by forging a nephew's name on commitments and by embezzling funds entrusted by Uppsala University, close acquaintances, and others. Hamilton was a gambler (particularly roulette and the card game Trente et Quarante) and addicted to morphine, and his gambling habits abroad, in particular in Germany, had resulted in a desperate need for money. Given the potential impact of this large scandal, particularly because high-profile socialites and King Oscar II had close friendships with Hamilton, he was spared prosecution but forced to resign from all his positions and memberships in all learned societies. He was also forced into exile, and moved to southern France. He still drew a pension from the Swedish government and he also received a pension from the Royal Order of the Seraphim. There were also rumors of King Oscar II helping him financially. He died five years later in Amélie-les-Bains, France. The conservative movement among the ruling class of Sweden at the time to preserve the societal order decided to forget about Hamilton; today he is largely forgotten in Sweden.

== Writings ==
Hamilton was a prolific author and wrote many books, such as Bibliothek för krigshistoria och krigskonst (1837–1839), Afhandling om krigsmaktens och krigskonstens tillstånd i Sverige under konung Gustaf II Adolfs regering (1846; awarded with a gold medal in 1839), Kriget i Tyskland år 1866 (1869), Några betraktelser i anledning af kriget mellan Frankrike och Tyskland 1870 (1871) and Frankrike och Tyskland åren 1866–74 (1877). A large number of academic memorials were also written by Hamilton, for example, on Carl De Geer (1781–1861) (1869), August von Hartmansdorff (1870), Carl Gustav Rehnsköld (1878), Carl Fredrik Akrell (1878), Jacob Nils Tersmeden (1879) and Jacob de la Gardie (1768–1842) (1880), and he was also frequently active in newspapers and journals with (at times anonymous) contributions on the political issues of the day.

== Family ==
In 1837, he married Maria Catharina von Rosén (1817–1902), daughter of President Baron Erik Gabriel von Rosén and Catharina Charlotta Rydberg.

== Biography ==
- Palmgren, CG (2000). Gåtan Henning Hamilton (in Swedish). Atlantis. ISBN 978-91-7486-506-6.

Cultural offices
Preceded by Carl David Skogman	Swedish Academy, Seat No 9; 1856–81	Succeeded by Esaias Tegnér Jr.
