= Anton Niklas Sundberg =

The Most Reverend Anton Niklas Sundberg
- Archbishop of Uppsala; Primate of Sweden
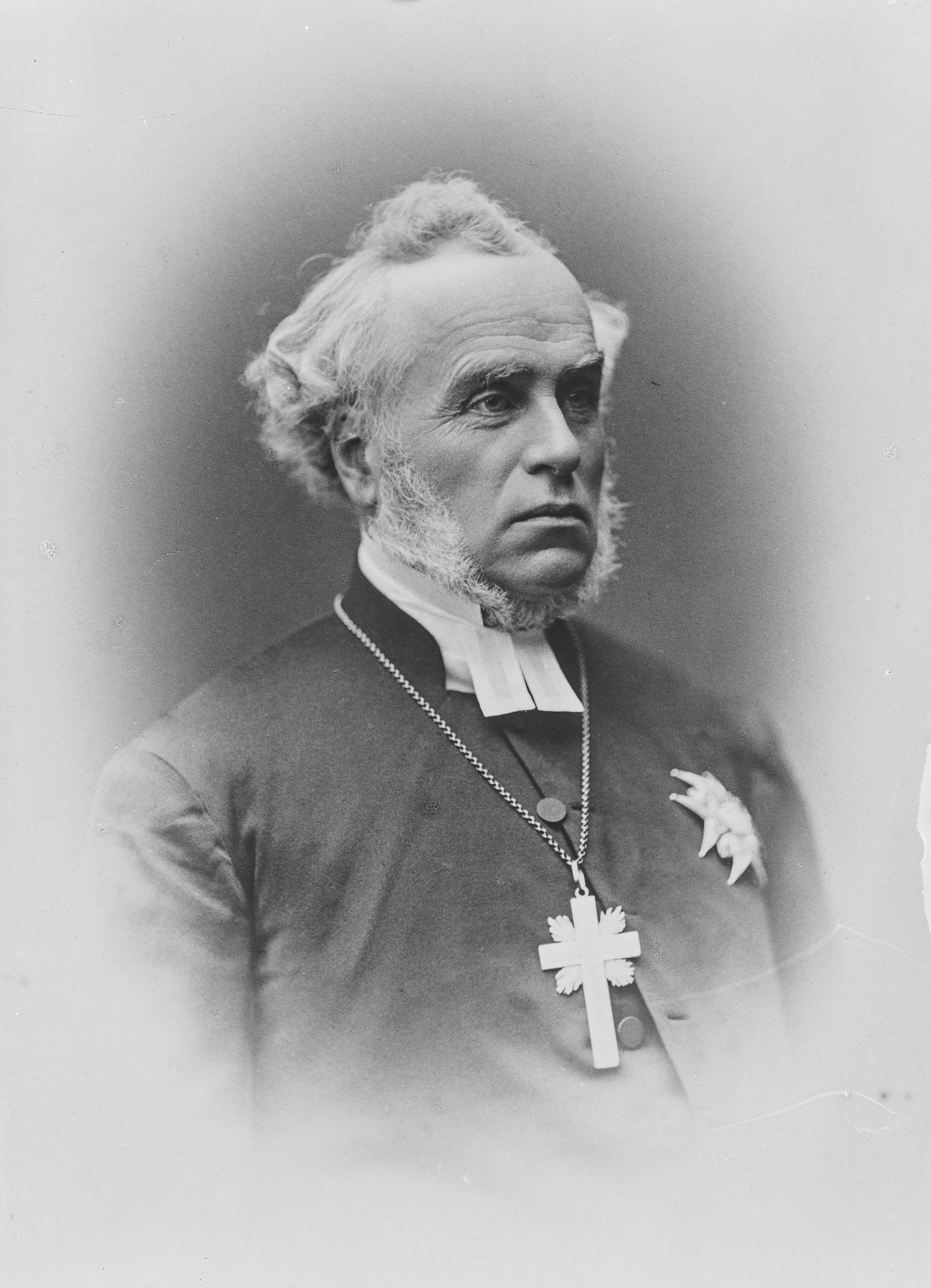
- Church: Church of Sweden
- Archdiocese: Uppsala
- Appointed: 1870
- In office: 1870–1900
- Predecessor: Henrik Reuterdahl
- Successor: Johan August Ekman
- Previous post: Bishop of Karlstad (1864-1870)

Orders
- Ordination: 1845
- Consecration: 6 March 1864 by Henrik Reuterdahl

Personal details
- Born: 27 May 1818 Uddevalla, Sweden
- Died: 2 February 1900 (aged 81) Uppsala, Sweden
- Buried: Uppsala gamla kyrkogård
- Parents: Sven Sundberg; Sara Katarina Lund

Anton Niklas Sundberg (27 May 1818, Uddevalla – 2 February 1900) was a Lutheran clergyman, and the Church of Sweden archbishop of Uppsala 1870–1900.

== Biography ==
He acquired a doctor of philosophy and theology degree at Uppsala University in 1842, became dean and was ordained a priest in 1845. He then undertook travel through Europe in 1849–50. He was a lecturer in theology at Lund University in 1849 and from 1852 to 1856 a professor of dogmatics and moral theology. From 1856 to 1864 he was professor of church history and symbolism at the university. In 1861 he was appointed vicar in Lund before being appointed bishop of the Diocese of Karlstad in 1864. In 1870, he became Archbishop of Uppsala and Pro-Chancellor of Uppsala University. Sundberg was a member of the Swedish Academy from 1874 and of the Royal Swedish Academy of Sciences from 1877.

== Other sources ==
- Article Sundberg, A.N. From Svenskt biografiskt handlexikon (in Swedish)
- Anton Niklas Sundberg, from Bilder och minnen, by Harald Wieselgren, 1889

== Related reading ==
- Bexell, Oloph (2003) Sveriges kyrkohistoria. 7, Folkväckelsens och kyrkoförnyelsens tid (Verbum, Stockholm) ISBN 9789152624623

Religious titles
Preceded by Henrik Reuterdahl	Archbishop of Uppsala; 1870–1900	Succeeded by Johan August Ekman
Cultural offices
Preceded by Ludvig Manderström	Swedish Academy, Seat No.15; 1874–1900	Succeeded by Gottfrid Billing
