= List of bishops of Västerås =

There has been a diocese centred upon the historic city of Västerås in Sweden since the Middle Ages, well before the Reformation. The first bishop of Västerås has been considered to be David of Munktorp (died 1082) but the sources claiming that are all of late medieval origin and are disputed. Västerås had several bishops during the 12th century but they are all unknown by name.

== Bishops of Västerås before and during the Reformation ==
- Robertus 1219–1225
- Magnus 1232–1258
- Carolus 1258–1283
- Petrus 1284–1299
- Öiarus 1299
- Haquinus 1299–1300
- Nicolaus Catilli 1300–1308
- Israel Erlandi 1309–1328
- Egislus Birgeri 1329–1352
- Magnus Augustini 1353–1369
- Laurentius Boberg 1370
- Mathias Laurentii 1371–1379
- Hartlevus Hartlevi 1379–1383
- Beno Henrici Korp 1383–1394
- Nicolaus 1395–1403
- Andreas Johannis 1403
- Petrus Ingevasti 1403–1414
- Ingemarus Ingevaldi 1414
- Nafno Johannis Gyrstinge 1414–1421
- Olaus Jacobi Knob 1421–1442
- Achatius Johannis 1442–1453
- Petrus Mathiae de Vallibus 1453–1454
- Olaus Gunnari 1454–1461
- Benedictus Magni 1461–1462
- Birgerus Magni 1462–1464
- Ludechinus Abelis 1465–1487
- Olaus Andreae de Vallibus 1487–1501
- Otto Olavi (Svinhufvud) 1501–1522
- Petrus Jacobi Guti (Sunnanväder) 1523

== Bishops of Västerås during and after the Reformation ==
- Petrus Magni / Peder Månsson 1524–1534
- Henricus Johannis 1534–1556
- Peder Swart (Petrus Andreae Niger) 1557–1562
- Johannes Nicolai Ofeegh 1562–1574
- Erasmus Nicolai Arbogensis 1574–1580
- Petrus Benedicti Ölandus 1583–1588
- Olaus Stephani Bellinus 1589–1606
- Nicolaus Petri 1606
- Olaus Stephani Bellinus 1608–1618
- Johannes Johannis Rudbeckius 1619–1646
- Olavus Laurentii Laurelius 1647–1670
- Nicolaus Johannis Rudbeckius 1670–1676
- Johannes Petri Brodinus 1677–1680
- Carolus Carlson 1680–1708
- Petrus Malmberg 1708–1710
- Matthias Iser 1711–1725
- Sven Cameen 1725–1729
- Nils Barchius 1731–1733
- Andreas Kallsenius 1733–1750
- Samuel Troilius 1751–1760
- Lars Benzelstierna 1760–1800
- Johan Gustaf Flodin 1800–1808
- Eric Waller 1809–1811
- Gustaf Murray 1811–1825
- Sven Wijkman Casparsson 1829–1839
- Gustaf Nibelius 1839–1849
- Christian Fahlcrantz 1849–1866
- Carl Olof Björling 1866–1884
- Gottfrid Billing 1884–1898
- Johan August Ekman 1898–1900
- Nils Lövgren 1900–1920
- Einar Billing 1920–1939
- Johan Cullberg 1940–1962
- Sven Silén 1962–1975
- Arne Palmqvist 1975–1988
- Claes-Bertil Ytterberg 1988–2008
- Thomas Söderberg 2008-2015
- Mikael Mogren 2015-
