= Murray (Swedish family) =

Swedish non-noble family

Murray is a Swedish family, which descends from the old Scottish noble family Murray, of which a branch emigrated to East Prussia in the middle of the 17th century. From there, Andreas Murray came to Sweden in 1735 as second pastor of the German church in Stockholm. In 1738 he became first pastor of the same church and in 1752, at the coronation of king Adolf Frederick, he became doctor of theology. Of his children, two sons made themselves known as doctors, Johan Andreas Murray and Adolph Murray; a third, Gustaf Murray became a bishop and in 1810 was ennobled while retaining his surname Murray.
