= Allium pallasii =

小山薤 xiao shan xie Лук Палласа Лук Альберта

Scientific classification
- Kingdom: Plantae
- Clade: Tracheophytes
- Clade: Angiosperms
- Clade: Monocots
- Order: Asparagales
- Family: Amaryllidaceae
- Subfamily: Allioideae
- Genus: Allium
- Subgenus: A. subg. Allium
- Species: A. pallasii

Binomial name
- Allium pallasii Murray

Synonyms
- Synonymy: Allium albertii Regel; Allium caricifolium Kar. & Kir.; Allium lepidum Ledeb.; Allium nitidulum Fisch. ex Ledeb.; Allium pallasii var. macrospathum Regel; Allium pallasii var. nitidulum (Fisch. ex Ledeb.) Regel; Allium pallasii var. stipellatum Regel; Allium saxatile Hohen. ex Boiss.; Allium semiretschenskianum Regel; Allium tenue G.Don

Species of flowering plant

Allium pallasii is a species of wild onion native to Central Asia, Mongolia, Altay Krai and Xinjiang. It occurs in deserts and dry steppes at elevations of 600–2300 m.

Allium pallasii had one round bulb up to 20 mm across. Scape is up to 30 cm tall. Leaves are tubular, shorter than the scape, up to 2.5 mm wide. Flowers are pale red or pale purple.
