= Västerås Cathedral =

- Västerås domkyrka
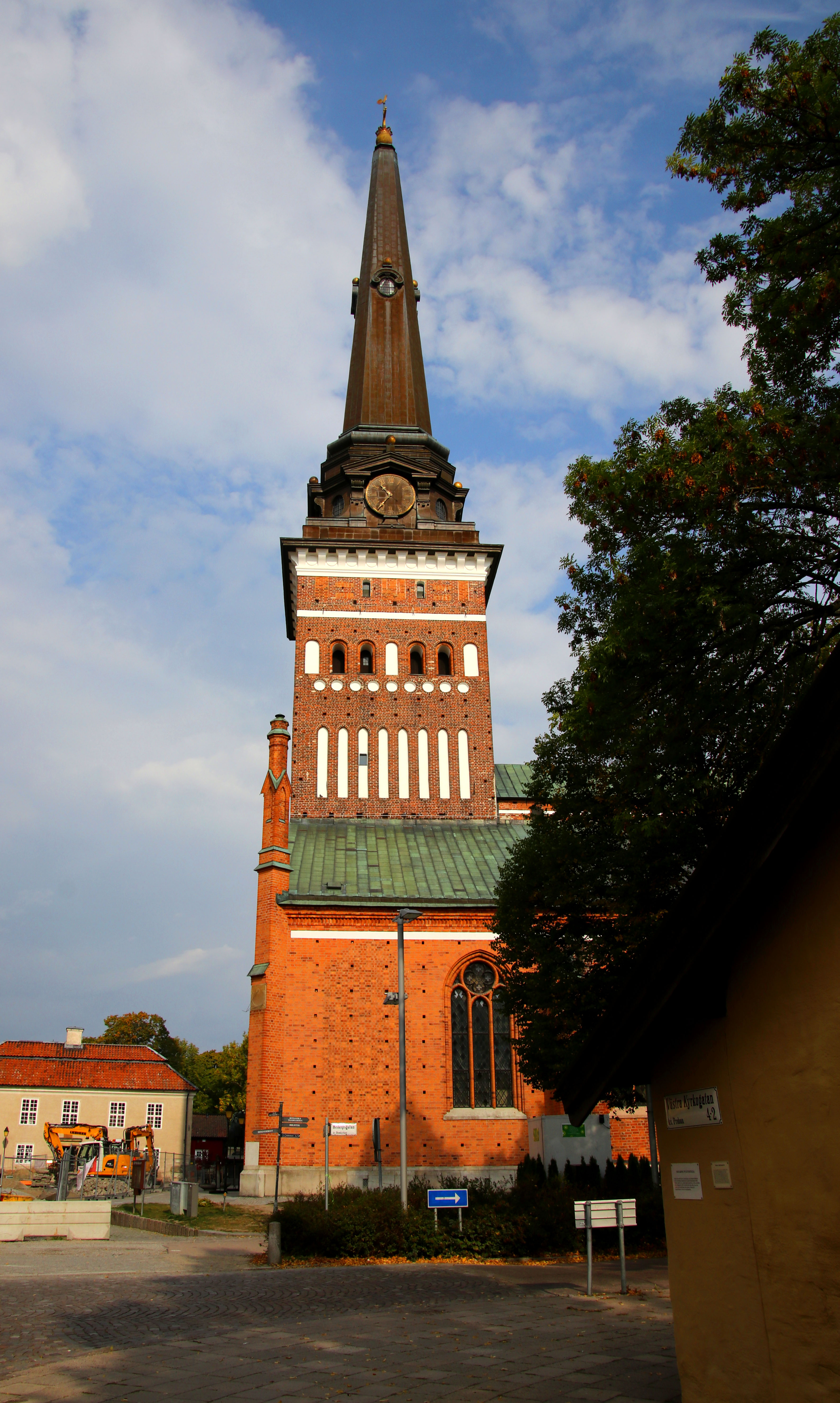
- Västerås Cathedral
- Västerås Cathedral
- 59°36′45″N 16°32′28″E
- Location: Västerås
- Country: Sweden
- Denomination: Church of Sweden
- Previous denomination: Roman Catholic

History
- Status: Cathedral
- Dedication: Virgin Mary & John the Baptist
- Consecrated: 16 August 1271

Architecture
- Functional status: Active

Specifications
- Capacity: 1,100 (sitting)
- Length: 93.2 m (305 ft 9 in)
- Width: 34.4 m (112 ft 10 in)
- Height: 91.8 m (301 ft 2 in)

Administration
- Diocese: Diocese of Västerås

Clergy
- Bishop: Mikael Mogren

Västerås Cathedral (Swedish: Västerås domkyrka) is the seat of the Diocese of Västerås in the Province of Västmanland, Sweden. The church building is a five-aisled hall church, with copper-covered roof and a single west tower with side extensions and an obelisk-shaped, copper-clad spire. It is built in the Scandinavian Brick Gothic style.

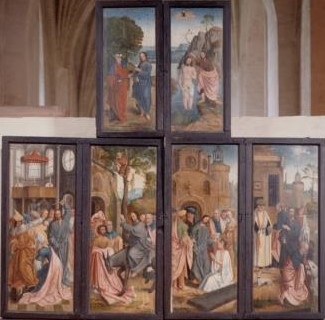
Outer panels of the retable of St Mary by Adriaen van Overbeke in the Cathedral

== History ==
The present church was originally built as a Romanesque basilica with a nave and two side aisles in the 13th century and consecrated on 16 August 1271. It was dedicated to the Virgin Mary and John the Baptist. The cathedral has undergone numerous extensions since. The church was expanded eastward under Bishop Lydeke Abelsson in the 1460s. When a chapel in the southwestern corner of the church was added to 1517, the church reached its present size. The outer roof of copper was laid during the 17th century. The present Baroque spire from 1694 was designed by Nicodemus Tessin the Younger (1654–1728). The spire is built of oak, without iron beams or nails, and lined with copper. During the 1500s, 1600s and 1700s, there were also many fixtures that changed the interior. The organ was built in 1940 by Marcussen & Sön and is an electropneumatic organ.

Johannes Rudbeckius (1581–1646), was bishop at Västerås from 1619 until his death. The cathedral houses the sarcophagus of Eric XIV of Sweden who was King of Sweden from 1560 until 1568.

== Great organ ==
"Organ builders P. L. Åkerman & Lunds Orgelfabriks Aktiebolag have completed in a praiseworthy manner the contract and the provisions of the estimate therein cited concerning the building of this organ, one of the most significant in our land and in more than one respect unique, whereby the organ is by us thoroughly approved".

From the inspection report of 8 March 1898

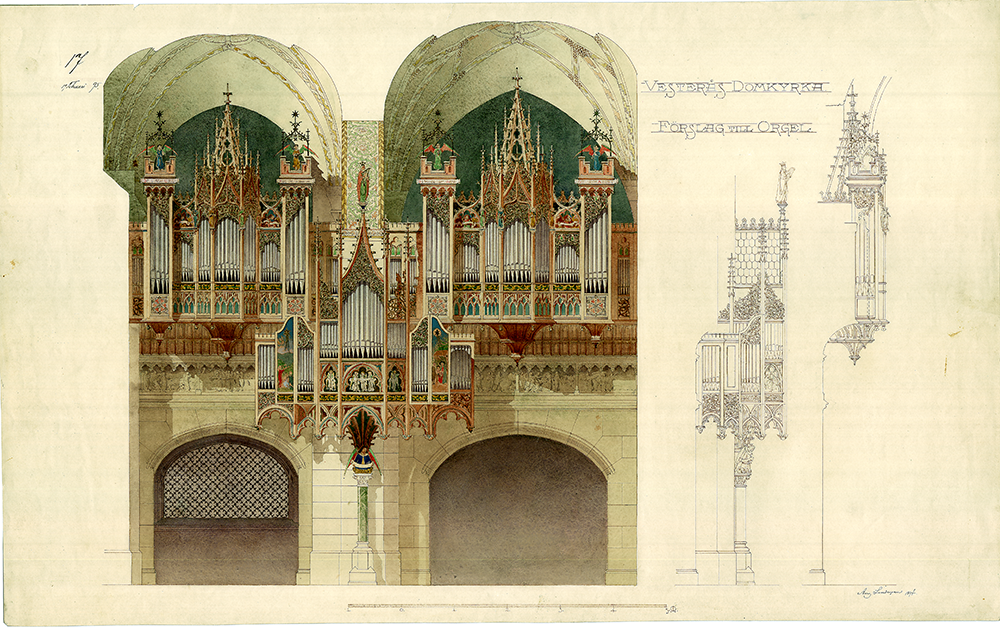
Agi Lindegrens original drawing for facade prospect, Västerås Cathedral,

The above praise was written by Gustaf Hägg and August Lagergren, responsible for inspecting the great organ built by Åkerman & Lund in Stockholm and still used today. Originally, the organ had 40 stops over three manuals and pedals. This was the first large organ in Sweden to be built with tubular pneumatic action. The organ was also one of the first in Sweden to have high pressure stops – five of them, no less. The impressive organ façade was designed by Agi Lindegren.

During its long service, the organ has been enlarged a number of times, most recently in 1998 by the English company Harrison & Harrison Ltd. and in 2009 by the Swedish firm Åkerman & Lund orgelbyggeri AB. However, the basis of the instrument is still the organ of 1898. The renovation was seeking to recreate the monumental original sound of the instrument.

Today, it contains 65 stops over four manuals and pedals.

* = high pressure stops.

I Great organ C–g^{3}

Principal
16'
Principal
8'
Gamba
8'
Stentorphon *
8'
Flûte harmonique *
8'
Octava
4'
Flûte octaviante
4'
Qvinta
3'
Octava
2'
Cornett
V
Mixtur
IV-VII
Trompet
16'
Tuba mirabilis *
8'

Couplers

II/I, III/I, IV/I

I 4'/I

II Positif / Choir C–g^{3}

Borduna
16'
Principal
8'
Dolce
8'
Flûte harmonique
8'
Borduna
8'
Octava
4'
Rörfleut
4'
Flageolette
2'
Cornett
III
Mixtur
IV
Corno
8'
Cromorne
8'
Tremulant

Couplers

III/II, IV/II

II 16'/II

III Swell C–g^{3}

Basetthorn
8'
Salicional
8'
Voix céleste
8'
Rörfleut
8'
Fugara
4'
Flûte octaviante
4'
Nasard
2^{2}/_{3}′
Waldfleut
2'
Nasard
1^{3}/_{5}′
Mixtur
III-IV
Fagott
16'
Trompette harmonique
8'
Oboe
8'
Clairon
4'
Tremulant

Couplers

IV/III

III 4'/III, III 16'/III

IV Echo C–g^{3}

Violin
8'
Salicional
8'
Voix céleste
8'
Dubbelflöjt
8'
Flauto amabile
8'
Echofleut
4'
Clarinette
8'
Voix humana
8'
Tremulant

Bombarde

(playable from manual I, II and IV)

Trompette *
8'
Clairon *
4'

Couplers

IV 4'/IV, IV 16'/IV

Pedal C–f^{1}

Untersatz
32'
Principal
16'
Violon
16'
Subbas *
16'
Ekobas
16'
Qvinta
12'
Octava
8'
Violoncelle
8'
Borduna
8'
Octava
4'
Mixtur
IV
Contrabasun
32'
Tuba *
16'
Fagott
16'
Trumpet
8'
Trumpet 4'

Couplers

I/P, II/P, III/P, IV/P

== Gallery ==
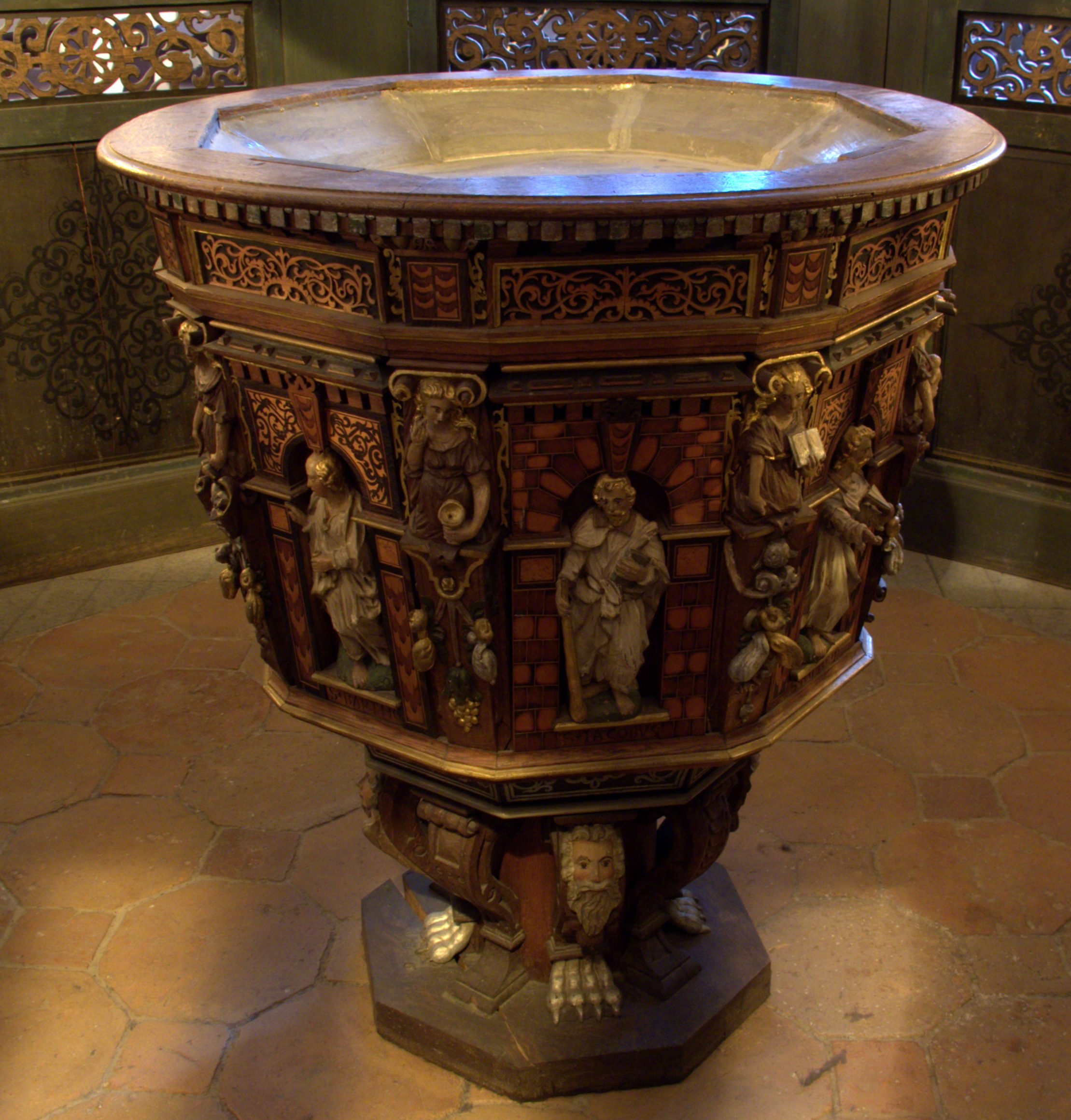
Baptismal

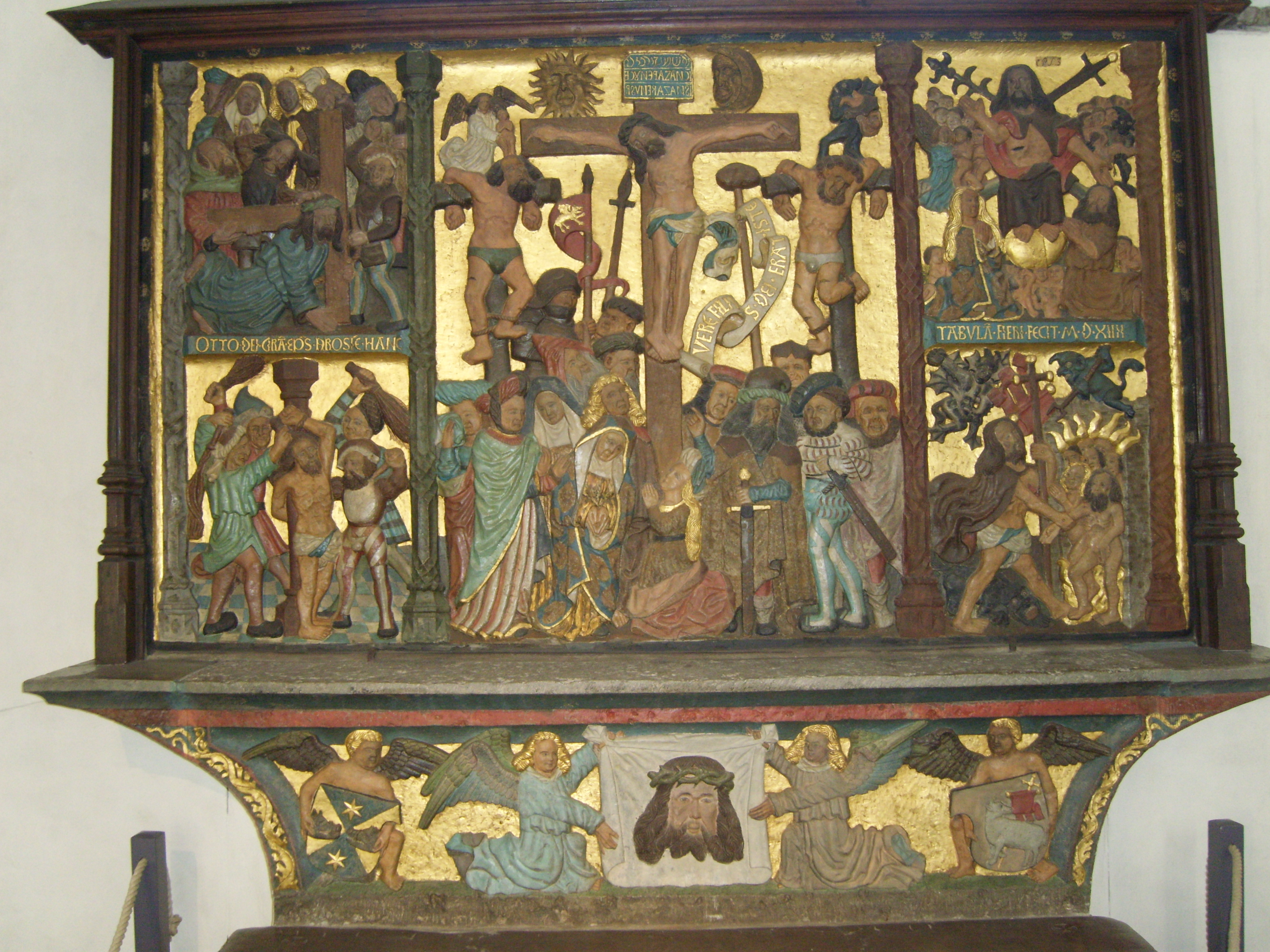
Altarpiece

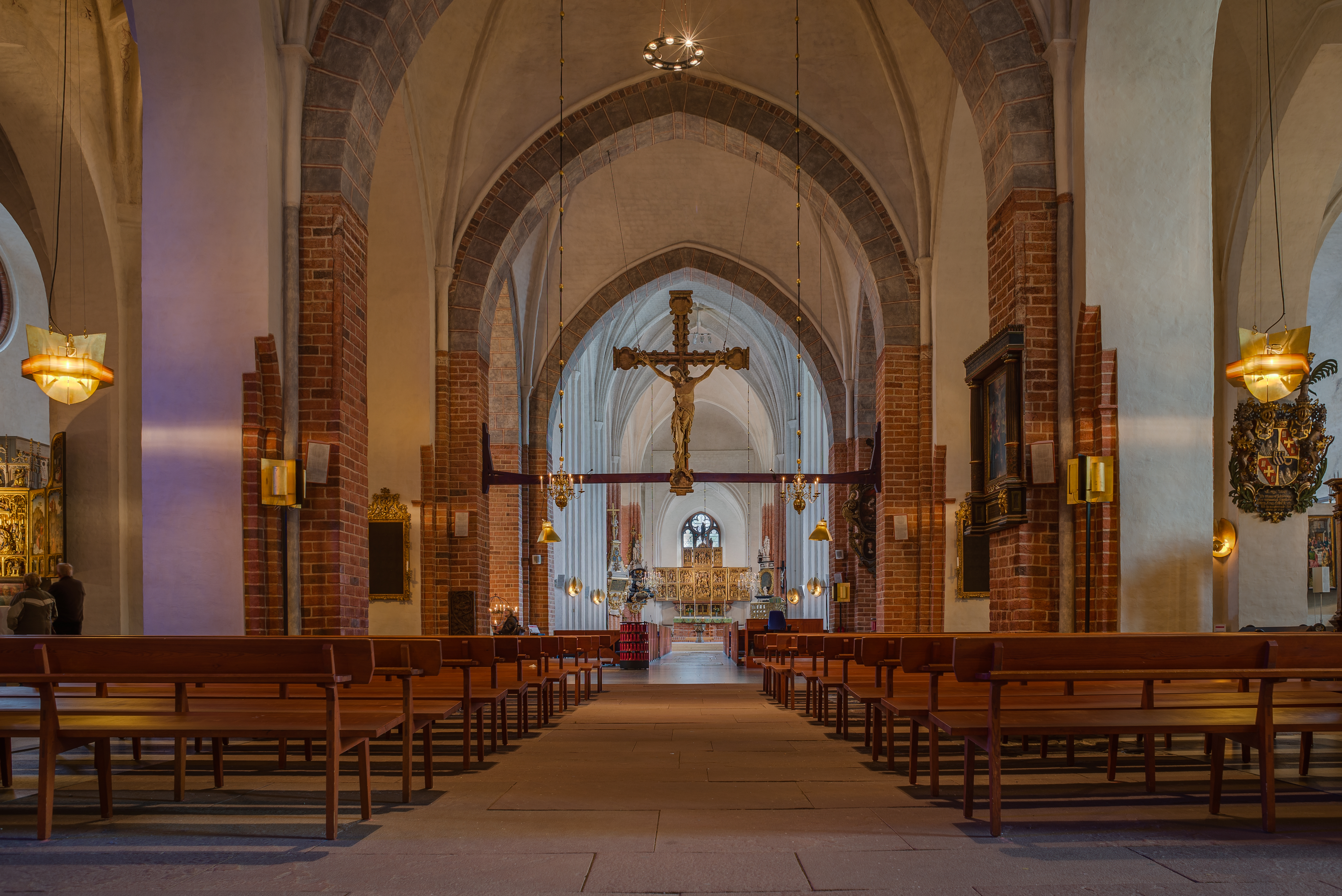
Interior

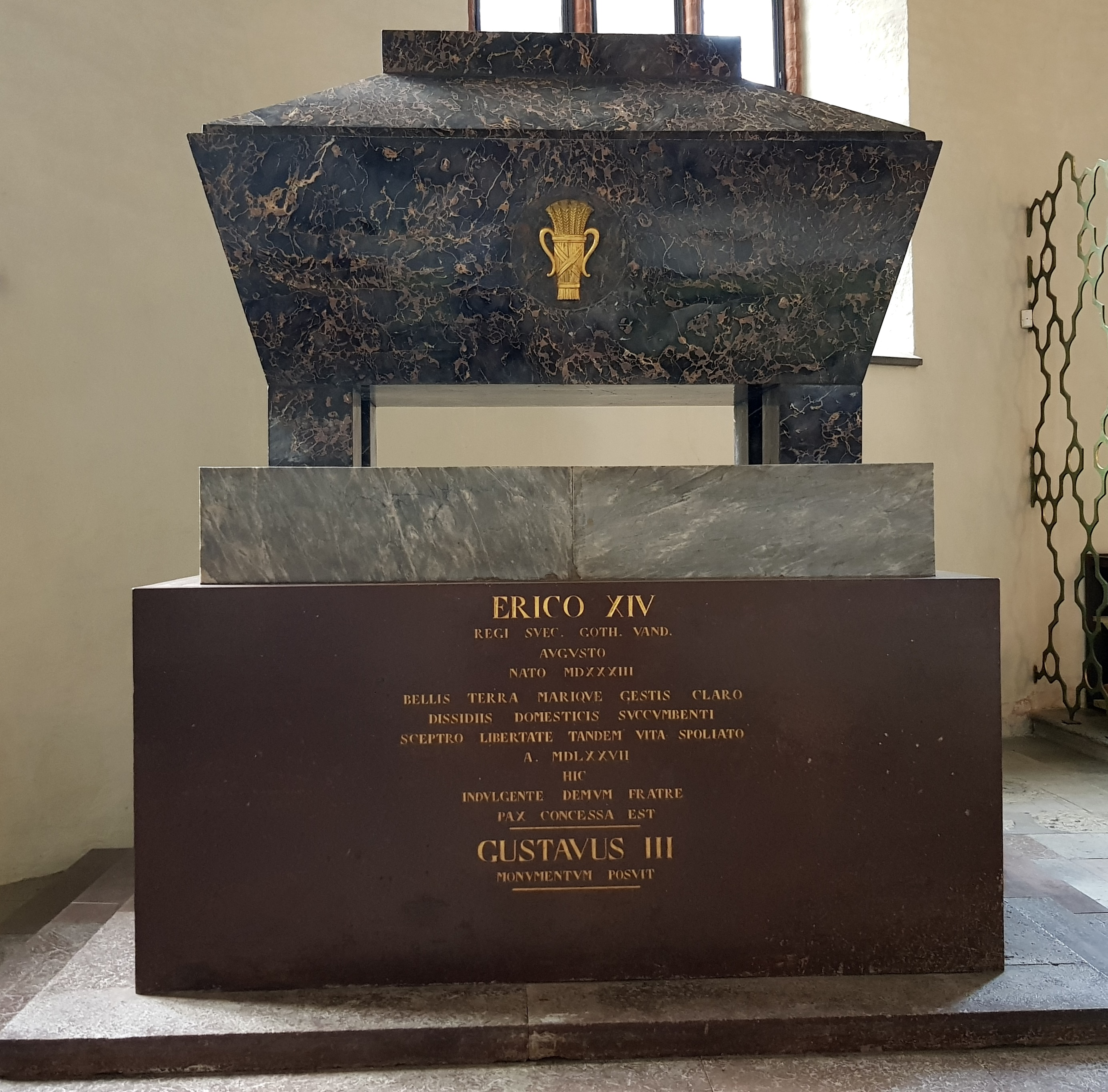
Tomb of Eric XIV of Sweden

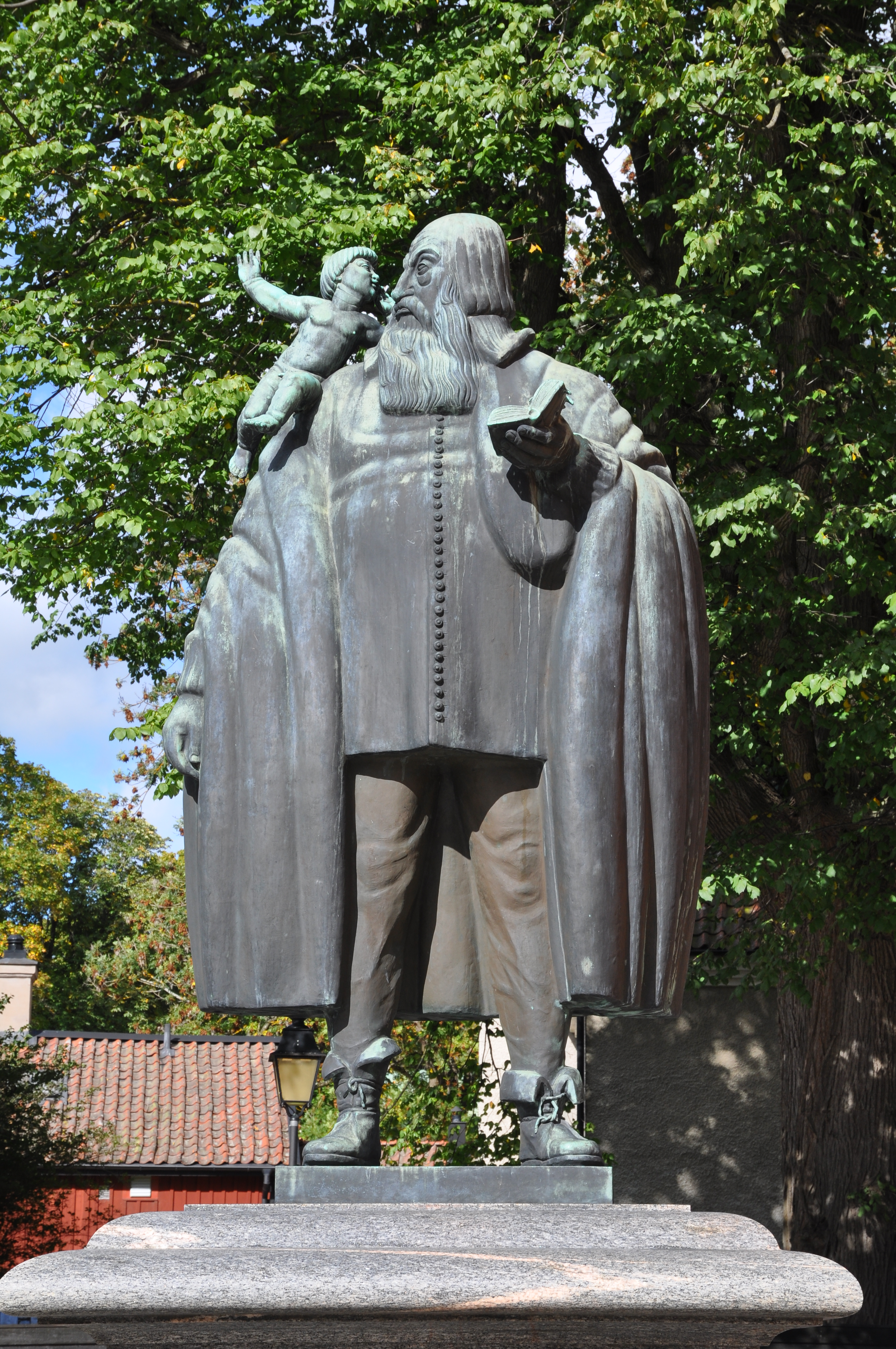
Statue of Johannes Rudbeckius

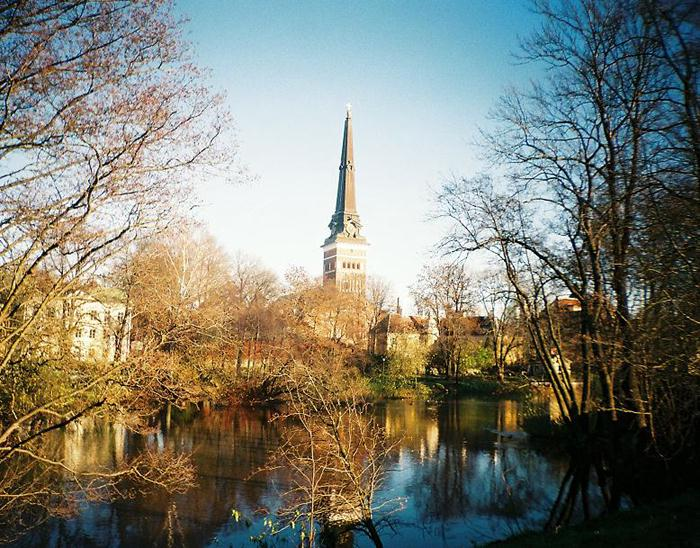
The cathedral seen from the banks of River Svartån
