= Edvard Magnus Rodhe =

Swedish bishop (1878–1954)

The Right Reverend Edvard Magnus Rodhe
- Bishop of Lund
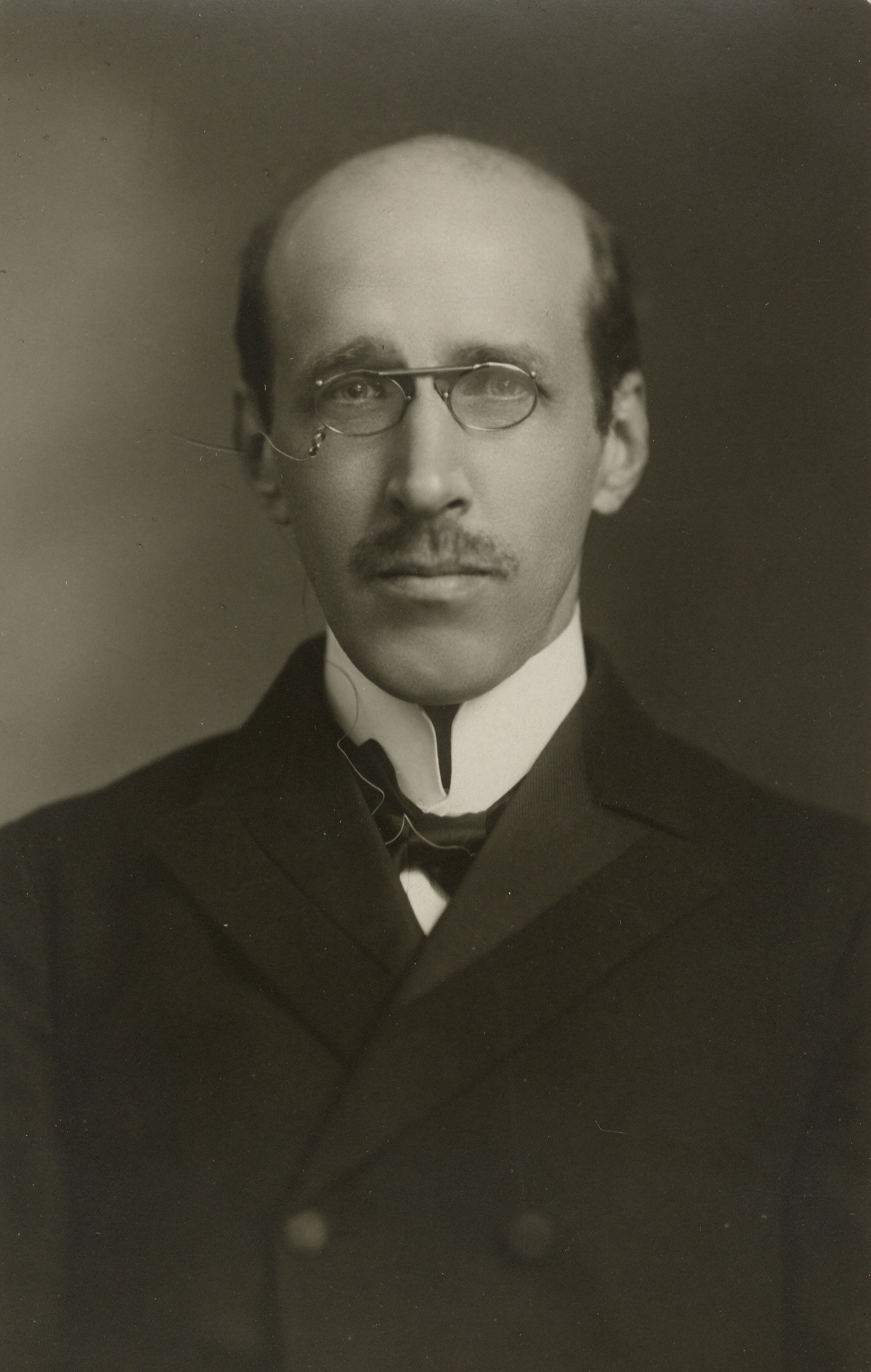
- Church: Church of Sweden
- Diocese: Lund
- Elected: 1925
- In office: 1925–1948
- Predecessor: Gottfrid Billing
- Successor: Anders Nygren

Orders
- Consecration: 16 August 1925 by Nathan Söderblom

Personal details
- Born: 17 December 1878 Lund, Sweden
- Died: 12 April 1954 (aged 75) Skara, Sweden
- Buried: Norra cemetery, Lund
- Spouse: Ruth Billing
- Education: Lund University

Edvard Magnus Rodhe (17 December 1878 – 12 April 1954) was a Swedish theologian and Bishop of Lund from 1925 to 1948.

== Biography ==
Edvard Rodhe was born in Lund, son of the clergyman Edvard Herman Rodhe (1845–1932), Bishop of the Diocese of Gothenburg (1888–1929). He graduated from the Gothenburg Latin gymnasium 1896 and matriculated at Lund University the same year. He completed his Bachelor of Arts (filosofie kandidat) degree in 1898, and completed his theology degree in 1904, after having spent time at the universities of Leipzig, Marburg and Berlin. He defended a dissertation for a docentship in 1905 and taught in Lund until he was appointed professor of practical theology at Uppsala University and vicar of Gamla Uppsala parish in 1912, becoming Doctor of Theology at Lund University the same year. He was professor of practical theology and canonical law at Lund University from 1919 until 1925 and appointed Bishop of the Diocese of Lund in 1925, retiring in 1948. Rodhe was the last bishop of Lund to serve as Pro-Chancellor of Lund University. Edvard Rodhe was married to Ruth Billing (1876–1951), daughter of Bishop Gottfrid Billing.

== Literature ==
- Bexell, Oloph "Edvard Rodhe och den praktiska teologin" Summary: Edvard Rodhe and the Subject of Practical Theology. Religion och Bibel. Nathan Söderbloms-Sällskapets årsbok 62–63 (2003–2004)
