= Johannes Rudbeckius =

Swedish bishop (1581–1646)

The Right Reverend Johannes Rudbeckius
- Bishop of Västerås
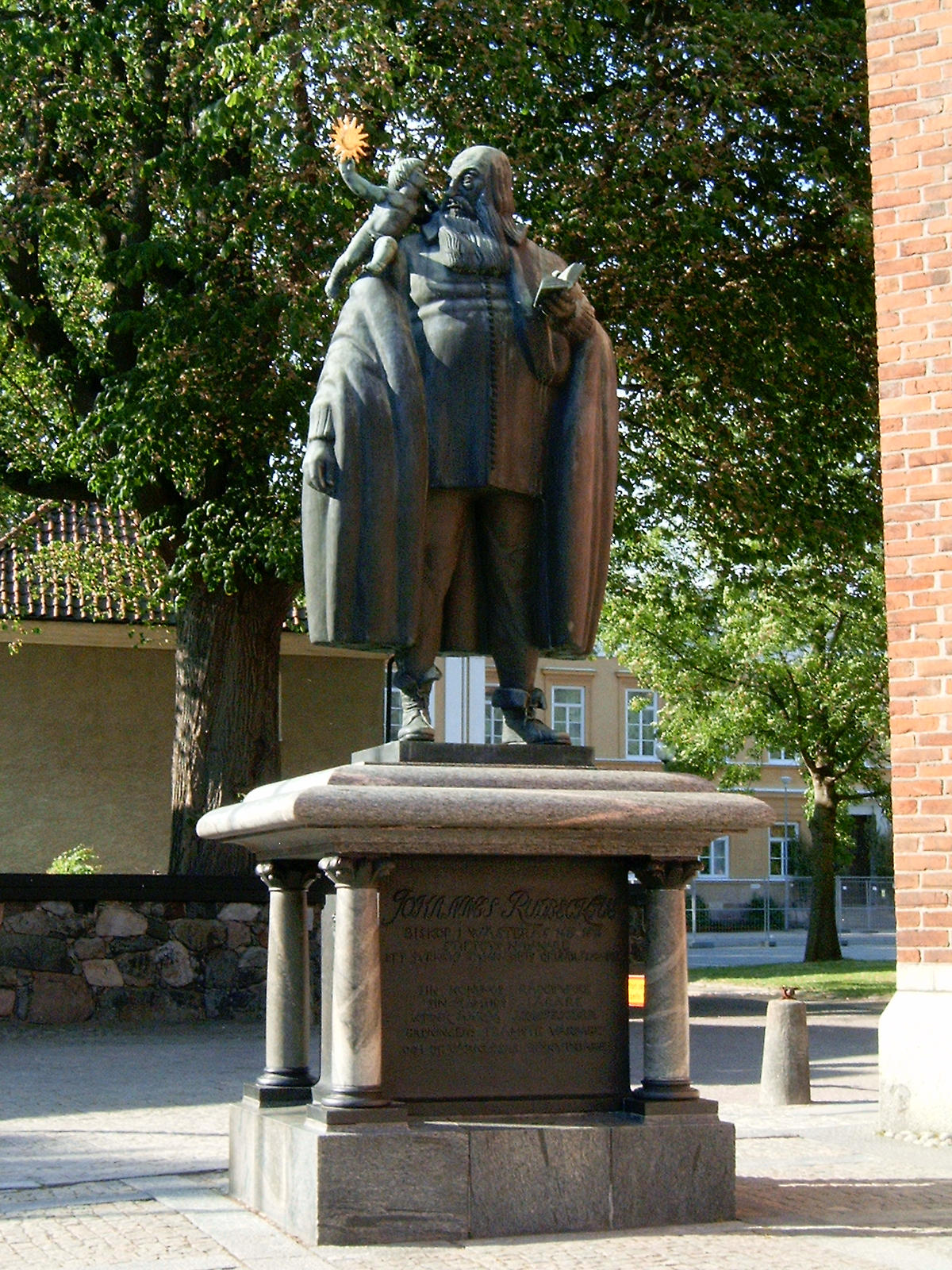
- Statue of Johannes Rudbeckius by Carl Milles
- Diocese: Diocese of Västerås
- Predecessor: Olaus Stephani Bellinus 1608–1618
- Successor: Olavus Laurentii Laurelius 1647–1670

Personal details
- Born: Johannes Rudbeck; 3 April 1581 Örebro, Sweden
- Died: 8 August 1646 (aged 65) Västerås, Sweden
- Occupation: Lutheran cleric, professor, bishop

Bishop Johannes Rudbeckius or Johannes Rudbeck (3 April 1581 – 8 August 1646) was bishop at Västerås, Sweden, from 1619 until his death and personal chaplain to King Gustavus II Adolphus.

== Biography ==
Being a member of the Rudbeck family, Johannes was born in Ormesta, Almby parish, outside Örebro, Sweden. He was the son of Johan Pedersson Rudbeck (1550–1603) and Christina Pedersdtr Bose. He was a student at Uppsala University in 1598 and at University of Wittenberg received his Master of Philosophy in 1603. He was a professor of mathematics at Uppsala from 1604, professor of Hebrew from 1609 and professor of theology from 1611.

He was made Bishop in the Diocese of Västerås in 1618. In his capacity of bishop, he was restlessly active in organising. He founded the Swedish system of parish registers, ordering his parsons to file comments on every person in the parish. In 1623 he founded the first gymnasium, a school of secondary education in Sweden. He also founded the first school for girls in Sweden, Rudbeckii flickskola, in 1632. Rudbeckius was considered politically suspect by his superiors but his reforms were gradually introduced in the whole country.

== Personal life ==
With his second wife Magadalena Malin Carlsdotter (1602–1649), he had a son Olaus Rudbeck (1630–1702), who was a noted scientist of the 17th century. His grandson Olof Rudbeck the Younger (1660–1740) was a scientist, botanist and ornithologist. Bishop Rudbeckius' granddaughter, Wendela Rudbeck (1668–1710), married Peter Olai Nobelius (1655–1707) from whom descended Alfred Nobel (1833–1896).
