= Culture of Öland =

Royal castle

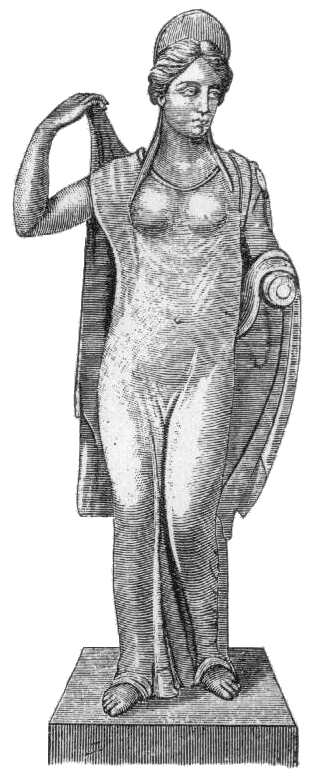
Bronze figurine, found at Öland

The culture of Öland, a Swedish island, was molded by its history and its relations with the continent.

== Landscape and buildings ==
The Borgholm Castle was rebuilt between 1572-1589 by John III of Sweden. Located in the vicinity is also Solliden Palace, summer home to the royal family. The castle was once integrated with the Halltorps royal estate.

The agricultural landscape of southern Öland, which is known as the Stora Alvaret or Great Alvar, has been entered as a site of the UNESCO World heritage program. Features of this are the many windmills left standing and the special geological landscape called Alvar. This low lying limestone plateau is the habitat of a number of rare species of endemic wildflowers and butterflies.

== Festivals ==
For a decade, Öland has been organizing an annual harvest festival called Skördefesten that takes place every October. In terms of this event, the island's farmers gather with farmers from the rest of the country and sell their crops and let those that are interested take part in everyday life on their farms, among other activities. There are also many art exhibitions for display during Skördefesten especially during the art night Konstnatten.

== Arts ==
The romantic poet Erik Johan Stagnelius was born in the Öland parish of Gärdslösa in 1793 and lived there until 16 years of age. He wrote several poems about the island. More modern writers living on or writing about Öland include novelist Margit Friberg (1904–1997), poet Anna Rydstedt (1928–1994), novelist Birgitta Trotzig (1929-2011), poet Lennart Sjögren (1930-), children novelist Eva Bexell (1945-), poet Tom Hedlund (1945-), novelist Johan Theorin (1963-), poet and novelist Magnus Utvik (1964-) and novelist Per Planhammar (1965-).
