= Bexell =

Bexell may refer to

- Bexell (surname)
- Bexell Cottage in Sweden
- John Bexell House in Oregon, United States
