= Gottfrid Billing =

Swedish cleric and theologian (1841–1925)

The Right Reverend Gottfrid Billing
- Bishop of Lund
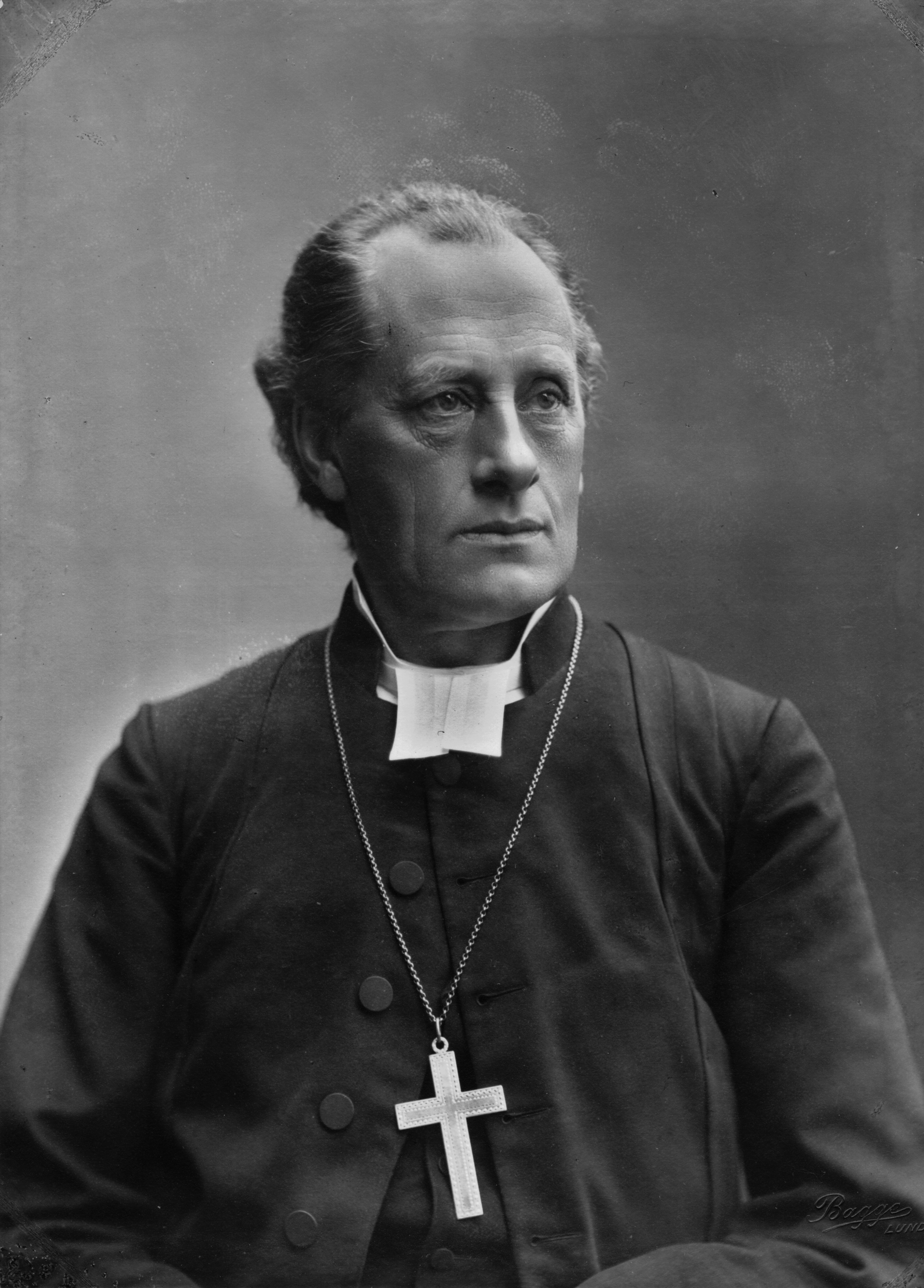
- Church: Church of Sweden
- Diocese: Lund
- Elected: 1898
- In office: 1898–1925
- Predecessor: Wilhelm Flensburg
- Successor: Edvard Magnus Rodhe

Orders
- Consecration: 7 September 1884 by Anton Niklas Sundberg

Personal details
- Born: 29 April 1841 Önnestad, Sweden
- Died: 14 January 1925 (aged 83) Lund, Sweden
- Buried: Norra kyrkogården, Lund
- Denomination: Lutheran
- Parents: Magnus Billing & Hedvig Charlotta Collin
- Spouse: Frida Bring
- Children: Einar Billing
- Education: Lund University

Axel Gottfrid Leonard Billing (29 April 1841 – 14 January 1925) was a Swedish cleric and theologian who served as a member of the Swedish Academy, member of the Första kammaren (upper house) in the Riksdag and Bishop of Lund from 1898 until 1925.

== Early life ==
Billing was born at Önnestad in Kristianstad Municipality, the son of Magnus Billing and Hedvig Charlotta Collin. In the early 1860s Billing enrolled as a theology student at Lund University. Billing represented a very conservative political view that has sometimes been called Oscarian after King Oscar II. In 1881 he became professor of practical theology at Lund University.

== Bishop ==
In 1884, he was appointed Bishop of Västerås and was consecrated on 7 September 1884 by Archbishop Anton Niklas Sundberg. In Västerås, he deepened his contacts with the royal family. He also represented Västerås in the parliament's upper house on the conservative bench. In 1900, after the death of Anton Niklas Sundberg, Billing was offered the position of Archbishop of Uppsala; however, he declined. He accepted to take over Sundberg's place in the Swedish Academy, a post he held until his death in 1925. In 1898 he was appointed Bishop of Lund.

Billing was elected as a member of the Royal Swedish Academy of Sciences in 1908 and the Royal Society of the Humanities at Lund in 1919. He was awarded an honorary doctorate in Lund on 28 September 1918 and received the Royal Order of the Seraphim on 6 June 1921.

== Personal life ==
In 1868, he married Frida Bring, daughter of Bishop Ebbe Gustaf Bring of Linköping, and Ulla Ehrenborg, sister of the writer Betty Ehrenborg. He was the father of Einar Billing. Bishop of Västerås and the father-in-law of Bishop Edvard Magnus Rodhe, Bishop of Lund. Billing died in 1925 and was buried at Norra kyrkogården in Lund.

Titles in Lutheranism
Preceded by Carl Olof Björling	Bishop of Västerås; 1884–1898	Succeeded by Johan August Ekman
Preceded by Wilhelm Flensburg	Bishop of Lund; 1898–1925	Succeeded by Edvard Magnus Rodhe
