= Johann Philipp Murray =

German historian (1726–1776)

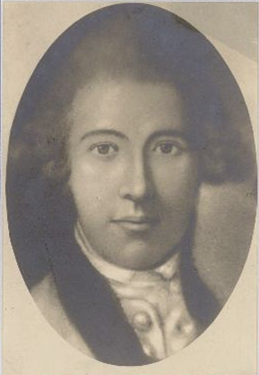
- Born: 30 July 1726; Schleswig
- Died: 12 January 1776 (aged 49); Göttingen
- Occupation: Historian

Johann Philipp Murray (30 July 1726 – 12 January 1776) was a German historian who was mainly interested in early Nordic studies and the relations between England and Scandinavia.

== Biography ==
Johann Philipp Murray was born on 30 July 1726 in Schleswig. He was the oldest son of the Prussian-born preacher and theologian Andreas Murray (1695 - 1771). His brothers were the professors Johann Andreas Murray (1740-1791) and Adolph Murray (1751-1803), and the Bishop Gustaf Murray (1747-1825). Murray was a student in Königsberg in 1742, Uppsala in 1746 and Göttingen in 1747. In 1748 he became a Master of Arts at the University of Göttingen, assistant professor in 1755 and full professor in 1762. He died on 12 January 1776 in Göttingen.

== Work ==
Murray was mainly interested in material from the Nordic region and the history of England during antiquity and the Middle Ages. For example, he wrote about runes, the history of the Nordic countries in earlier times, Nordic settlements in the British Isles and Philippa of England, the queen of Eric of Pomerania. His writings also discussed coins, seals and watermarks. He had an extensive correspondence with other scholars in Sweden and Germany. On the other hand, his lectures were not widely attended and his memory faded rapidly after his death.

== Selected bibliography ==
- Murray, Johan Philipp (1751). Die Eigenschaften einer gelassenen Seele bey der fürchterlichen Trennung aus dieser Zeitlichkeit suchte in einer Trauerrede auf seinen schätzbaren Freund Adam Heinrich Rhoden ... Johann Philipp Murray am vierzehenten Tage des Mayen 1751 zu bezeichnen. Schultzen.
- Murray, Johann Philipp (1754). Rede welche im Namen der königlichen deutschen Gesellschaft zum Gedächtnisse ihres verklärten Mitgliedes der Frau Professorin Sophien Eleonoren Achenwall, gebohrnen Walther... gehalten worden von... Johann Philipp Murray... V. Bossiegel.
- Kalm, Pehr; Murray, Johann Andreas; Murray, Johann Philipp (1754). Des Herren Peter Kalms, Professors der Haushaltungskunst in Aobo, und Mitgliedes der königlichen schwedischen Akademie der Wissenschaften: Beschreibung der Reise die er nach dem nördlichen Amerika : auf den Befehl gedachter Akademie und öffentliche Kosten unternommen hat. Im Verlage der Wittwe Abrams Vandenhoek.
- Murray, Johann Philipp (1771). De Coloniis Scandicis in Insvlis Britannicis, et maxima Hibernia commentatio praelecta d. VII. Dec. 1771.
- Murray, Johann Philipp (1774). Antiquitates Septemtrionales et Britannicae atque Hibernicae inter se comparatae: Commentatio altera de imperio civile studiisque humanitatis disserens.
- Kästner, Abraham Gotthelf; Murray, Johann Philipp (1776). Der Erinnerung Johann Philipp Murrays, ordentlichen Professors der Philosophie nach dessen Ableben ... gewidmet.
