= Oloph Bexell =

Swedish professor in Church history

- Born: 6 June 1947 (age 79)
- Education: Uppsala University
- Occupation: Church historian
- Father: Carl Bexell
- Relatives: Peter Bexell (brother)

Oloph Eric Fingal Bexell (born 6 June 1947) is a Swedish priest (Church of Sweden) and professor emeritus in church history at Uppsala University.

== Biography ==
Oloph Bexell received his bachelor of theology in 1974 and was ordained in the Diocese of Växjö the same year. In 1988 he defended his thesis in practical theology, and was employed the same year by the Swedish Church Board for Teaching and Education. He later became a researcher (Bank of Sweden Tercentenary Foundation) in the history of Christianity at Uppsala University from 1989 to 1991. He received his docent certification in church and social sciences in 1990. From 1992 to 2000 Bexell worked as a university instructor in the subject. He became professor of ecclesiology in 2000, and of church history from 2006 to 2014, and was during that time subject representative in the subjects. He was subsequently senior professor of church history.

His research focuses on the history of liturgy, homiletics, hymnology and canon law, as well as on biographies, where he has authored a large number of articles in the national biographical dictionary Svenskt biografiskt lexikon, around 25 as of 2014. From 1995 to 2005 he was a member of the editorial board for the publication of the book series Sveriges kyrkohistoria ('Swedish Church History'), where he wrote volume 7, Folkväckelsens och kyrkoförnyelsens tid ('The era of revival and church renewal', 2003). There and in various essays he has marked pastoral history as an important part of church history. As part of the scientific history project "Uppsala universitets historia 1793–2000" ('History of Uppsala University 1793–2000'), he has published Teologiska Fakulteten vid Uppsala universitet 1916–2000. Historiska studier (2021) as a stand-alone volume. In the international record series Corpus Christianorum, he published in 2023 a critical edition of decision of the Uppsala assembly in 1593 with commentary. As a result of the assembly, the Swedish church decided to adopt the Lutheran confession.

He was editor of the journal Svensk pastoraltidskrift from 1976 to 1998, official diocesan orator to the memory of the deceased at the synodal conference in Växjö from 1990 to 2002, expert member of the Bible Commission from 1992 to 1996, chairman of the St. Ansgar Foundation since 1995 and the Segelberg Foundation since 1997, and board member of the Samariterhemmet since 2000. He is an honorary member of the Smålands nation in Uppsala. He was formerly deputy dean of the Faculty of Theology in Uppsala, and until 2015 chairman of the Swedish Society of Church History (Svenska kyrkohistoriska föreningen.) He is president of the Samfundet Pro Fide et Christianismo, vice-president of the Royal Society of Arts and Sciences of Uppsala and member of the Royal Manuscripts Society (Kungliga Samfundet för utgivande av handskrifter rörande Skandinaviens historia) and the Nathan Söderblom Society.

=== Family ===
Bexell comes from the Bexell clerical family from Småland and is the son of rural dean Carl Bexell and Märtha Björkman. He is the brother of theologian Peter Bexell and cousin of ethics professor Göran Bexell and author Eva Bexell.
