= Olof Wallquist =

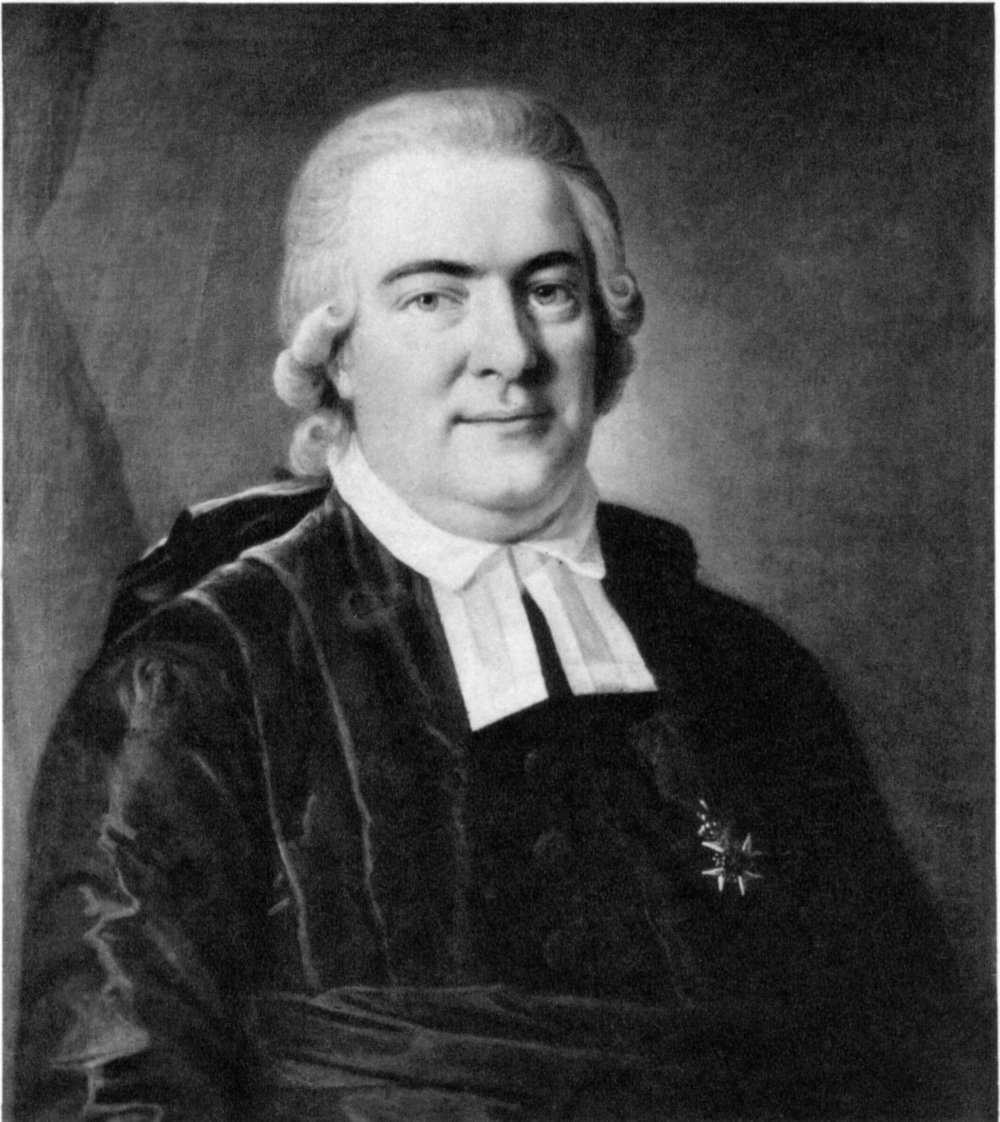
Olof Wallqvist painted in 1790.

Olof Wallquist (1755 – April 30, 1800) was a Swedish statesman and ecclesiastic.

== Biography ==
Wallqvist was born in Edsberg, Närke. He was ordained in 1776, became Doctor of Philosophy in 1779, court preacher to Queen Louisa Ulrica in 1780, and bishop of Växjö in 1787. He attracted the attention of Gustavus III by his eloquent preaching at the fashionable St Clara church at Stockholm. Gustavus at once took the young priest by the hand, appointed him, at twenty-five, one of his chaplains; made him a canon before he was thirty and a bishop at thirty-two, and finally placed him at the head of the newly appointed commission for reforming the ecclesiastical administration of the country.

Thus at thirty-four Wallqvist had nothing more to hope for but the primacy, which would infallibly have been his also had the archbishop died during the king's lifetime. Wallqvist was, however, much more of a politician than a churchman. His knowledge of human nature, inexhaustible energy, dauntless self-confidence and diplomatic finesse made him indispensable to Gustavus III. His seductive manners too often won over those whom his commanding eloquence failed to convince.

His political career began during the mutinous riksdag of 1786, when he came boldly forward as one of the royalist leaders. But it was at the stormy riksdag of 1789 that Wallqvist put forth all his powers. The retirement of the timid primate left him without an equal in the Estate of Clergy, and it was very largely due to his co-operation that the king was able to carry through the famous "Act of Unity and Security" which converted Sweden from a constitutional into a semi-absolute monarchy.

On 16 February 1789 Gustav III privately told Wallquist that he intended, the next day, to confront the Estate of Nobles before the three other estates and compel their assent. Wallquist initially urged him against extra-constitutional measures, but once the king refused to change course, the bishop worked to secure support for him among the non-noble estates. At the riksdag of 1789 Wallquist also acted as president of the ecclesiastical commission, where he took part in efforts to balance the budget and raise funds for the continuation of the war with Russia.

During the brief riksdag of 1792, as a member of the secret committee, Wallqvist was at the very centre of affairs and rendered the king essential services. Indeed, it may be safely said that Gustavus III, during the last six years of his reign, mainly depended upon Wallqvist and his clerical colleague, Carl Gustaf Nordin, who were patriotic enough to subordinate even their private enmity to the royal service.

During the Reuterholm administration, Wallqvist, like the rest of the Gustavians, was kept remote from court. In 1800 he was recalled to the political arena. But his old rivalry with Nordin was resumed at the same time, and when the latter defeated a motion of the bishop's in the Estate of Clergy, at the diet of Norrköping, Wallqvist from sheer vexation had a stroke of apoplexy and died the same day.

== Work ==
As bishop of Växjö, Wallqvist was remarkable for his administrative ability. He contributed for education and for the clergy, and endowed the library of the gymnasium with 6000 volumes. As an author he was distinguished. His Ecclesiastique Samlingar testify to his skill and diligence as a collector of manuscripts, while his Minnen och Bref, ed. E. V. Montan (Stockholm, 1878), are considered trustworthy documents relating to the Gustavian era of Swedish history.

== Memberships ==
Wallquist served as president of Pro Fide et Christianismo, a Christian education society.
