= Andreas Murray =

German-born Swedish theologian and priest

- Born: 9 August 1695; Memel, Duchy of Prussia
- Died: 1771; Sweden
- Occupation: Pastor

Andreas Murray (9 August 1695 – 1771) was a German-born Swedish theologian and priest, and founder of the Swedish Murray family.

Andreas Murray was born in Memel in the Duchy of Prussia, on 9 August 1695.The Swedish patent of nobility granted to his son Gustaf Murray in 1810 acknowledged the family's descent from the Scottish House of Atholl which probably fled to Prussia for political and religious reasons during the English Civil War. He studied in Königsberg in 1710 and in Jena in 1715, and was ordained in 1717. In the following year he traveled to Hamburg and England. He became an associate professor in Kiel and a preacher in Haddeby (Busdorf) in Schleswig. In 1736 he was sent to Sweden as assistant pastor at the German Church in Stockholm, and in 1739 was made first pastor of the same church. In 1752 he became a Doctor of Theology in Uppsala.

Andreas Murray died in 1771. He was praised as a thorough theologian and as a particularly excellent preacher.

Andreas Murray's son by his first marriage, Johann Philipp Murray (1726–1776), became a professor of history at the University of Göttingen. From his second marriage, Johann Andreas Murray (1740–1791) became a professor of Medicine and Botany at the University of Göttingen who is considered to be one of the founders of modern Pharmacology, while Gustaf Murray (1747–1825) became bishop of Västerås in 1811. His youngest son, Adolph Murray (1751–1803) was a pupil of Carl Linnaeus and became professor of anatomy and surgery at Uppsala University.
