= Thomas Söderberg =

Swedish Bishop

The Right Reverend Thomas Söderberg
- Bishop of Västerås
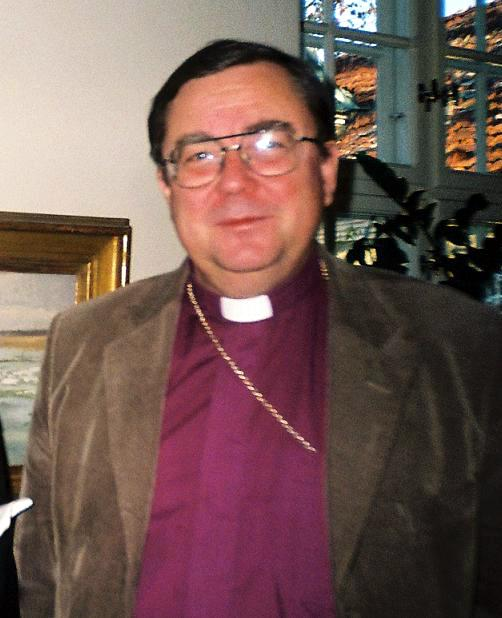
- Province: Church of Sweden
- Diocese: Diocese of Västerås
- Elected: 7 February 2008
- Installed: 4 May 2008
- Predecessor: Claes-Bertil Ytterberg
- Successor: Mikael Mogren

Orders
- Ordination: 1982
- Consecration: 4 May 2008 by Anders Wejryd

Personal details
- Born: Ulf Thomas Söderberg; 19 December 1948 (age 77) Stockholm, Sweden
- Denomination: Church of Sweden
- Education: Uppsala University
- Motto: Non quomodo mundus dat ego do vobis non turbetur cor vestrum neque formidet; ( Let not your heart be troubled, neither let it be afraid.)
- Coat of arms: Thomas Söderberg's coat of arms

Ordination history of Thomas Söderberg
History
Episcopal consecration
- Consecrated by: Anders Wejryd

Ulf Thomas Söderberg (born 19 December 1948) was Bishop of Västerås, Sweden, from 2008 to 2015.

== Biography ==
Söderberg grew up in Grängesberg. He has been strongly involved in the renewal of the Swedish Church. For several years he worked as a vicar in Svärdsjö parish in Dalarna. He was director of St Luke's Foundation and later became vicar of Enviken. He was elected Bishop of Västerås on February 7, 2008 and was consecrated on May 4, 2008 in Uppsala Cathedral. He was nominated for Archbishop of Uppsala in 2006 and came in third place. after Anders Wejryd and Ragnar Persenius. Söderberg retired September 5, 2015.
