= Karl Fredrik Dahlgren =

Swedish poet (1791–1844)

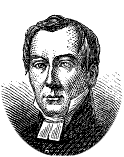
Karl Fredrik Dahlgren.

Karl Fredrik Dahlgren (1791–1844) was a Swedish poet.

At a time when literary partisanship ran high in Sweden, and the writers divided themselves into Goths and Phosphorists, Dahlgren made himself indispensable to the Phosphorists by his polemical activity. In the mock-heroic poem of Markalls sömnlösa nätter ("Markall's Sleepless Nights"), in which the Phosphorists ridiculed the academician Per Adam Wailmark and others, Dahlgren, who was a genuine humorist, took a prominent part.

== Life ==
He was born at Stensbruk in Östergötland on 20 June 1791.

In 1825 he published Babels Torn ("The Tower of Babel"), a satire, and a comedy, Argus in Olympen; and in 1828 two volumes of poems. In 1829 he was appointed to an ecclesiastical post in Stockholm, which he held until his death. In a series of odes and dithyrambic pieces, entitled Mollbergs epistlar (1819, 1820), he strove to emulate the wonderful lyric genius of Carl Michael Bellman, of whom he was a student and follower. From 1825 to 1827 he edited a critical journal entitled Kometen ("The Comet"), and in company with Anders Jacob Danielsson Cnattingius he founded the Manhemsförbund, a short-lived society of agricultural socialists. In 1834 he collected his poems in one volume; and in 1837 appeared his last book, Ångbåts-Sånger ("Steamboat Songs"). In 1837 he was the secretary for Pro Fide et Christianismo, a Christian education society. He was also a member of the Par Bricole society. On 1 May 1844 he died at Stockholm.

Dahlgren is one of the best humorous writers that Sweden has produced; but he was perhaps at his best in realistic and idyllic description. His little poem of Zephyr and the Girl, which is to be found in every selection from Swedish poetry, is a good example of his sensuous and ornamented style. His works were collected and published after his death by A. J. Arwidsson (Stockholm, 1847–1852).
