= Peder Månsson =

Swedish monk

The Right Reverend Peder Månsson O.Ss.S.
- Bishop of Västerås
- Church: Roman Catholic
- Diocese: Västerås
- Appointed: 27 April 1524
- In office: 1524–1534
- Predecessor: Peder Sunnanväder
- Successor: Henricus Johannis

Orders
- Ordination: 6 June 1499
- Consecration: 1 May 1524 by Paris de Grassis

Personal details
- Born: c.1460 Jönköping, Småland, Sweden
- Died: 17 May 1534 Västerås, Västmanland, Sweden

Peder Månsson (c.1460 – 17 May 1534) was a Swedish author and prelate who served as the Bishop of Västerås from 1524 till 1534.

== Biography ==
Månsson was born around the year 1460 in Jönköping, Småland, Sweden. His name is first documented in 1499 as being a chaplain and school rector in Vadstena. He was ordained a priest as a Bridgettine monk in Vadstena Abbey. In 1507 he went to Rome to seek permission to rebuild the Santa Brigida convent and church, which had been left falling apart. After three years Månsson's efforts managed to restore the building and in 1513 founded a church on the site and transferred the ownership to Vadstena Abbey. Månsson remained in Rome and became director of the monastery in Rome.

Månsson was appointed Bishop of Västerås in 1524 by Pope Clement VII. He was consecrated in Rome on 1 May 1524 by the Pope's Master of ceremonies and Bishop of Pesaro, Paris de Grassis. Through Månsson's consecration, the apostolic succession was retained in the Church of Sweden when he consecrated the Archbishop of Uppsala Laurentius Petri, the first Lutheran archbishop. Nevertheless, Peder was an opponent of the Protestant Reformation. He retained his post in Västerås till his death on 17 May 1534.
