= John Cullberg =

Bishop of Västerås

The Right Reverend John Cullberg Ph.D., D.D.
- Bishop of Västerås
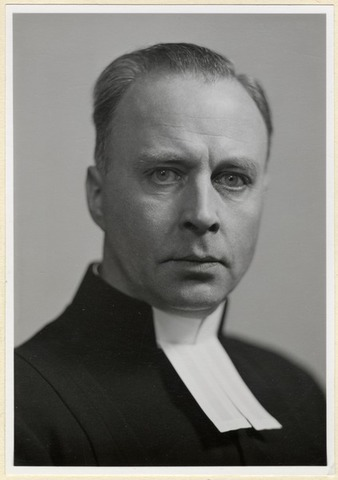
- Church: Church of Sweden
- Diocese: Diocese of Västerås
- Elected: 1940
- In office: 1940–1962
- Predecessor: Einar Billing
- Successor: Sven Sillén

Orders
- Ordination: 1928 (priest)
- Consecration: 1940

Personal details
- Born: John Olof Cullberg; April 23, 1895 Harestad, Sweden
- Died: August 10, 1983 (aged 88) Uppsala, Sweden
- Denomination: Lutheran
- Spouse: Eva Virgin
- Children: 5
- Education: Uppsala University

Ordination history of John Cullberg
History
Priestly ordination
- Date: 1928
- Place: Lund
Episcopal consecration
- Date: 1940
- Place: Uppsala Cathedral

John Cyllberg (born 23 April 1895 in Harestad, died 10 August 1983 in Uppsala) was a Swedish theologian and Bishop of Västerås between 1940 and 1962.

== Biography ==
After studies at Gothenburg University College Bachelor of Arts in 1915. After further studies at Uppsala University Licentiate of Art 1919, Bachelor of Divinity in 1922, Doctor of Philosophy in 1926, docent of philosophy of religion 1926 and Doctor of Divinity in 1933. Served as acting professor of theological encyclopedia in 1928–1929 and 1936 at Uppsala University. Ordained as priest in the Church of Sweden in 1928. Served as vicar in Balingsta, Hagby and Ramsta near Uppsala 1933–1940. Elected as bishop of the Diocese of Västerås in 1940, an office which he held until his retirement in 1962.
