= Einar Billing =

20th-century Bishop of Västerås

The Right Reverend Einar Billing D.D.
- Bishop of Västerås
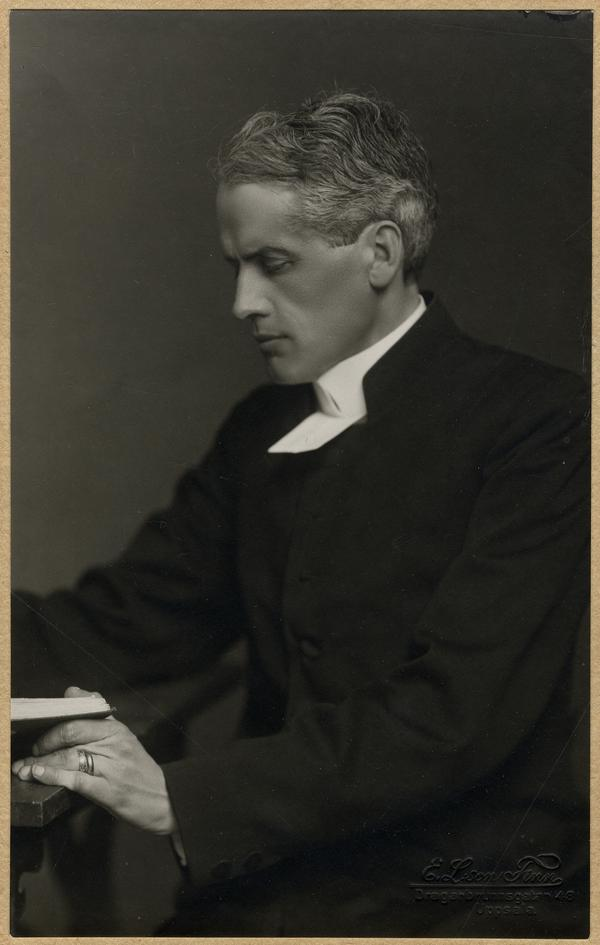
- Church: Church of Sweden
- Province: Church of Sweden
- Diocese: Diocese of Västerås
- Elected: 1920
- In office: 1920–1939
- Predecessor: Nils Lövgren
- Successor: John Cullberg

Orders
- Ordination: 1900 (priest) by Gottfrid Billing
- Consecration: 19 September 1920 by Nathan Söderblom

Personal details
- Born: Einar Magnus Billing; 6 October 1871 Lund, Sweden
- Died: 17 December 1939 (aged 68) Västerås, Sweden
- Denomination: Lutheran
- Education: Uppsala University

Ordination history of Einar Billing
History
Episcopal consecration
- Consecrated by: Nathan Söderblom

Einar Billing (6 October 1871 – 17 December 1939) was a Swedish hymnwriter and theologian. He was Bishop of Västerås from 1920 to 1939.

Billing was born 6 October 1871 in Lund. He was the son of bishop Gottfrid Billing.

Billing studied at Uppsala University and received a Bachelor of Arts in 1891 and a Bachelor of Divinity in 1898 and completed his Doctor of Divinity 1911. He also received a docent of moral theology and dogmatics in 1900. He served as assistant professor of moral theology and dogmatics from 1901 and professor of moral theology and dogmatics from 1909 at Uppsala University. Billing was ordained as a priest in the Church of Sweden in 1900 and served as a regimental pastor in Uppsala from 1901 to 1908. He was then vicar of the parishes in Hagby and Ramsta near Uppsala 1908 and vicar of the parish Heliga Trefaldighet (Holy Trinity) of Uppsala in 1909. The same year, he became a member of the Christian education society Pro Fide et Christianismo. He was elected as bishop of the Diocese of Västerås in 1920, an office he held until his death on 17 December 1939 in Västerås.

Gustaf Aulén was heavily influenced by Billing and counted his Luthers lära om staten (1900), Etiska tankarna i urkristendomen (1907) and Herdabrev (1920) as his most important works.
