= Bexell (surname) =

Bexell is a Swedish surname. Notable people with the surname include:

- Eva Bexell (born 1945), Swedish author
- Göran Bexell (born 1943), Swedish professor
- Olle Bexell (1909–2003), Swedish decathlete
- Oloph Bexell (born 1947), Swedish priest and professor
