= Mikael Mogren =

The Right Reverend Mikael Mogren
- Bishop of Västerås
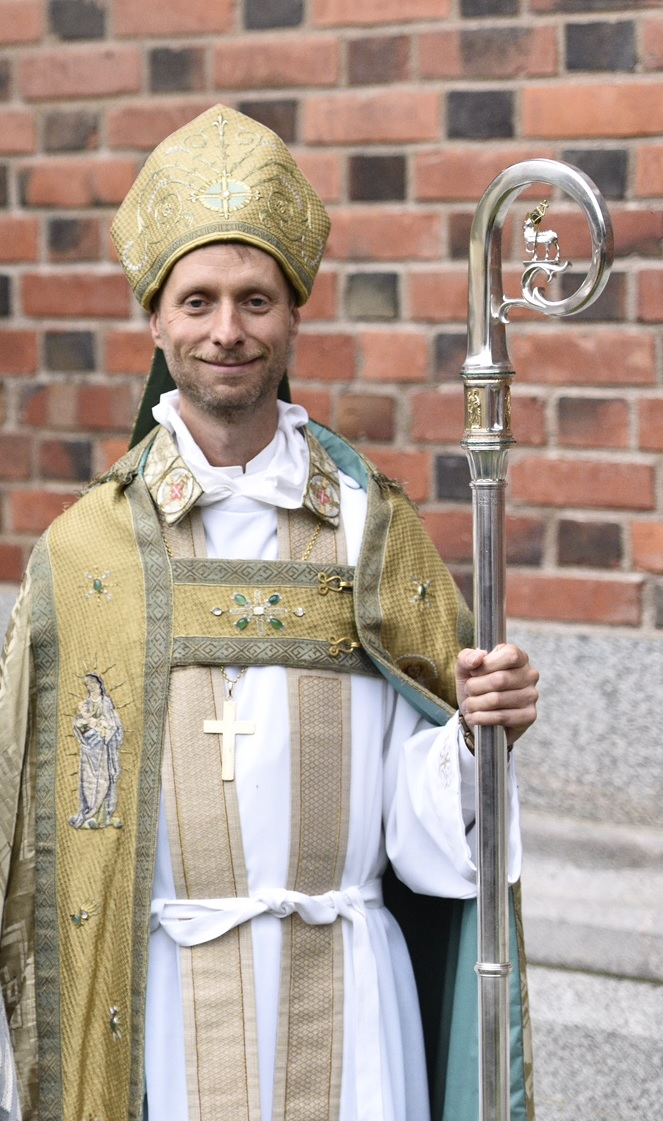
- Church: Church of Sweden
- Diocese: Västerås
- Appointed: 2015
- Predecessor: Thomas Söderberg

Orders
- Ordination: 9 June 1996 by Jonas Jonson
- Consecration: 6 September 2015 by Antje Jackelén

Personal details
- Born: 6 September 1969 (age 56) Hammar, Askersund, Sweden
- Motto: Ordet blev människa (The Word became flesh)
- Coat of arms

Bengt Mikael Mogren (born 6 September 1969) is a Swedish bishop, theologian and author.

== Biography ==
Morgen was born in a peasant family in Hammar, Askersund in Örebro. For some time, he worked as a prison officer. He has undergone training in antiquarian buildings in Gothenburg and studied theology in Uppsala, Tübingen and at Harvard University. In his master's thesis, he wrote about the youth movement in the Coptic Church. Mogren was ordained a priest in 1996 for the Diocese of Strängnäs by Bishop Jonas Jonson. Between 2004 and 2011, Mogren worked at Holy Trinity Parish in Uppsala. In 2011, he became the diocesan curate in Västerås.

He received his doctorate in church science with the dissertation Den romantiska kyrkan (The romantic church), dealing with his views on church and state in the early 1800s. He addresses the issue of the anti-Semitic ideas present among several romantic thinkers. In 2003, he was named Teacher of the Year by the students of the Faculty of Theology in Uppsala. On 19 May 2015 he was elected bishop of the Diocese of Västerås. He was ordained a bishop in Uppsala Cathedral on 6 September 2015.
