= Arne Palmqvist =

20th-century Swedish theologian and bishop

The Right Reverend Arne Palmqvist
- Bishop of Västerås
- Church: Church of Sweden
- Diocese: Diocese of Västerås
- Elected: 1975
- In office: 1975–1988
- Predecessor: Sven Sillén
- Successor: Claes-Bertil Ytterberg

Orders
- Ordination: 27 May 1956 (priest) by Yngve Brilioth
- Consecration: 1967

Personal details
- Born: Per Olof Arne Palmqvist; 28 May 1921 Brunflo, Sweden
- Died: 15 January 2003 (aged 81) Uppsala, Sweden
- Denomination: Lutheran
- Education: Uppsala University
- Motto: Redemptori Obviam
- Coat of arms: Arne Palmqvist's coat of arms

Per Olof Arne Palmqvist, (born 28 May 1921 in Brunflo, Jämtland, died 15 January 2003 in Uppsala). was a Swedish theologian, Bishop of the Diocese of Härnösand between 1967 and 1975 and of the Diocese of Västerås between 1975 and 1988.

After studies at Uppsala University Palmqvist became Licentiate of Divinity in 1950, Doctor of Divinity in 1955 and docent of ecclesiastical history in 1955. He was ordained as priest in the Church of Sweden 1956 in Uppsala. From 1959 teacher at the Stockholm Institute of Theology where he was prorector from 1965. Elected as bishop of the Diocese of Härnösand in 1967. He left this position after being elected as bishop of the Diocese of Västerås in 1975. Palmqvist stayed as bishop of the Diocese of Västerås until his retirement in 1988.

From the late 1950s to the early 1990s, Palmquist was a strong advocate of keeping the ties between government and church in Sweden. He was entrusted several assignments as an expert in preparing governmental reports. He also held a number of assignments in committees and boards of the Church of Sweden.

Palmqvist married Elsa Marianne Persson on 15 May 1948, who was born 16 November 1920 in Uppsala.
