= Olaus Rudbeck =

Swedish scientist and writer (1630–1702)

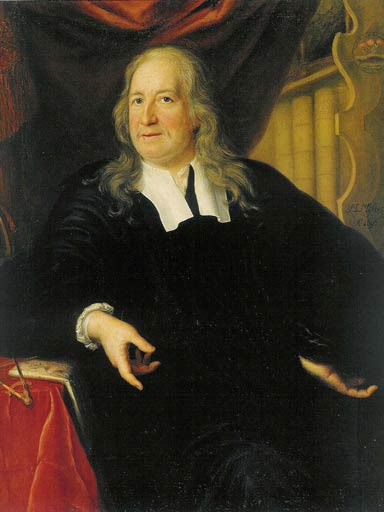
- Olaus Rudbeck, painted in 1696 by Martin Mijtens the Elder.
- Born: 13 September 1630; Västerås
- Died: 12 December 1702 (age 72); Uppsala
- Scientific career
- Fields: Medicine
- Workplaces: Uppsala University

Olaus Rudbeck (also known as Olof Rudbeck the Elder, to distinguish him from his son, and occasionally with the surname Latinized as Olaus Rudbeckius) (13 September 1630 – 12 December 1702) was a Swedish scientist and writer, professor of medicine at Uppsala University, and for several periods rector magnificus of the same university. He was born in Västerås, the son of Bishop Johannes Rudbeckius, who was personal chaplain to King Gustavus Adolphus, and the father of botanist Olof Rudbeck the Younger. Rudbeck is primarily known for his contributions in two fields: human anatomy and linguistics, but he was also accomplished in many other fields including music and botany. He established the first botanical garden in Sweden at Uppsala, called Rudbeck's Garden, but which was renamed a hundred years later for a student of his son's, the botanist Carl Linnaeus.

== Human anatomy ==
Born into the Rudbeck family, Olaus was one of the pioneers in the study of lymphatic vessels. According to his supporters in Sweden, he was the first to discover the lymphatic system and is documented as having shown his findings at the court of Queen Christina of Sweden in the Spring of 1652. However, he did not publish anything about it until the fall of 1653, after Thomas Bartholin, a Danish scientist, had published a description of a similar discovery of his own. (For other early discoverers of the lymphatic system, see Gasparo Aselli and Jean Pecquet).

Rudbeck was appointed professor of medicine at Uppsala University in 1660. Rudbeck's research led to the Queen's support of his career. To facilitate his studies of human anatomy, he had a cupola built on top of Gustavianum, a university edifice, and in it was built an arena-like Theatrum anatomicum, where dissection could be carried out in front of students. The cupola still remains and is a landmark in Uppsala. The "Gustavianum" stands in front of the cathedral, and is still part of the university.

== Historical linguistics ==
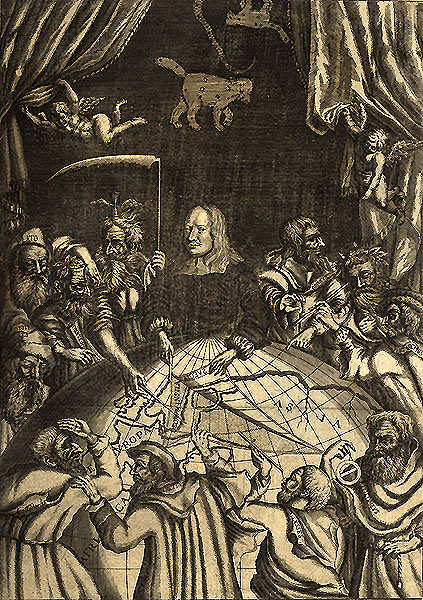
An illustration from 1689 in Olof Rudbeck's book Atlantica where he shows himself surrounded by Hesiod, Plato, Aristotle, Apollodorus, Tacitus, Odysseus, Ptolemy, Plutarch and Orpheus.

Between 1679 and 1702, Rudbeck dedicated himself to contributions in historical-linguistics patriotism, writing a 3,000-page treatise in four volumes called Atlantica where he purported to prove that Sweden was Atlantis, the cradle of civilization, and Swedish the original language of Adam from which Latin and Hebrew had evolved. His work was criticized by several Scandinavian authors, including the Danish professor Ludvig Holberg, and the Swedish author and physician Andreas Kempe, both of whom wrote satires based on Rudbeck's writings. His work was later used by Denis Diderot in the article "Etymologie" in Encyclopédie as a cautionary example of deceptive linking of etymology with mythical history.

David King, in his biography of Rudbeck, notes that he developed a system for measuring the age of old monuments and graves by the thickness of the humus accumulated over them – which, though many of his conclusions were erroneous, anticipated the methods of modern archaeology and was far in advance of most historians and antiquarians of his time.

Despite the criticism targeting his linguistic theories and despite the priority dispute with Bartholin, Rudbeck remained a national icon in Sweden for many years. His son, Olof Rudbeck the Younger, continued his linguistic work and also became involved in providing an "intellectual reason" for power during a period when Sweden aspired to a position as one of the great powers of Europe. Rudbeck the Younger added speculations about the relationship between Sami and Hebrew languages to his father's long list of fantastical linguistic relationships. A nephew of Olaus the Elder, Petter Rudebeck, also wrote antiquarian books going even further, purporting to locate the scene of the Trojan War and ancient city of Troy in southern Sweden.

The above-mentioned David King noted that, while specific conclusions of father and son Rudbeck about the relationships of various languages to each other were disproven, they anticipated the later systematic study of Indo-European languages, and the scientific proof that languages distant from each other geographically and historically are indeed related.

== Legacy ==
Rudbeck was active in many scientific areas, including botany and astronomy, and left many traces still visible in the city of Uppsala today.

In 1655, he established the first botanical garden in Sweden at Uppsala, called Rudbeck's Garden, but which was renamed a hundred years later for his son's student, the botanist Carl Linnaeus. Rudbeck also aimed to produce a projected 12-volume encyclopedia of all known plants of the world called Campi elysii. Life-sized woodcut illustrations of many of the species were included in the two volumes that were published, and the woodblocks for these were made by Rudbeck as well as his son Olof, his two daughters, Johanna Christina and Wendela, and other colleagues. It is thought that about 3,200 woodblocks were cut for the series, and those remaining today (about 140 from volume 1) are housed at the Linnean Society of London.

The plant genus Rudbeckia was named by Linnaeus in honor of both Rudbeck and his son.

During the course of a fire that destroyed most of Uppsala in 1702, a large portion of Rudbeck's writings, woodblocks and copies of the first two volumes of Campi elysii was lost. Rudbeck himself directed the people of the city, shouting orders from a roof while his house burned down. He died the same year, shortly after the fire, and was buried in Uppsala Cathedral at the transept.

The Nobel family, including Ludvig Nobel, the founder of Branobel, and Alfred Nobel, the founder of the Nobel Prizes, was a descendant of Rudbeck through his daughter Wendela, who married one of her father's former students, Peter Olai Nobelius.

== See also ==
- Atlantis
- Confusion of tongues
- Location hypotheses of Atlantis
