= Carl Gustaf Nordin =

Swedish politician

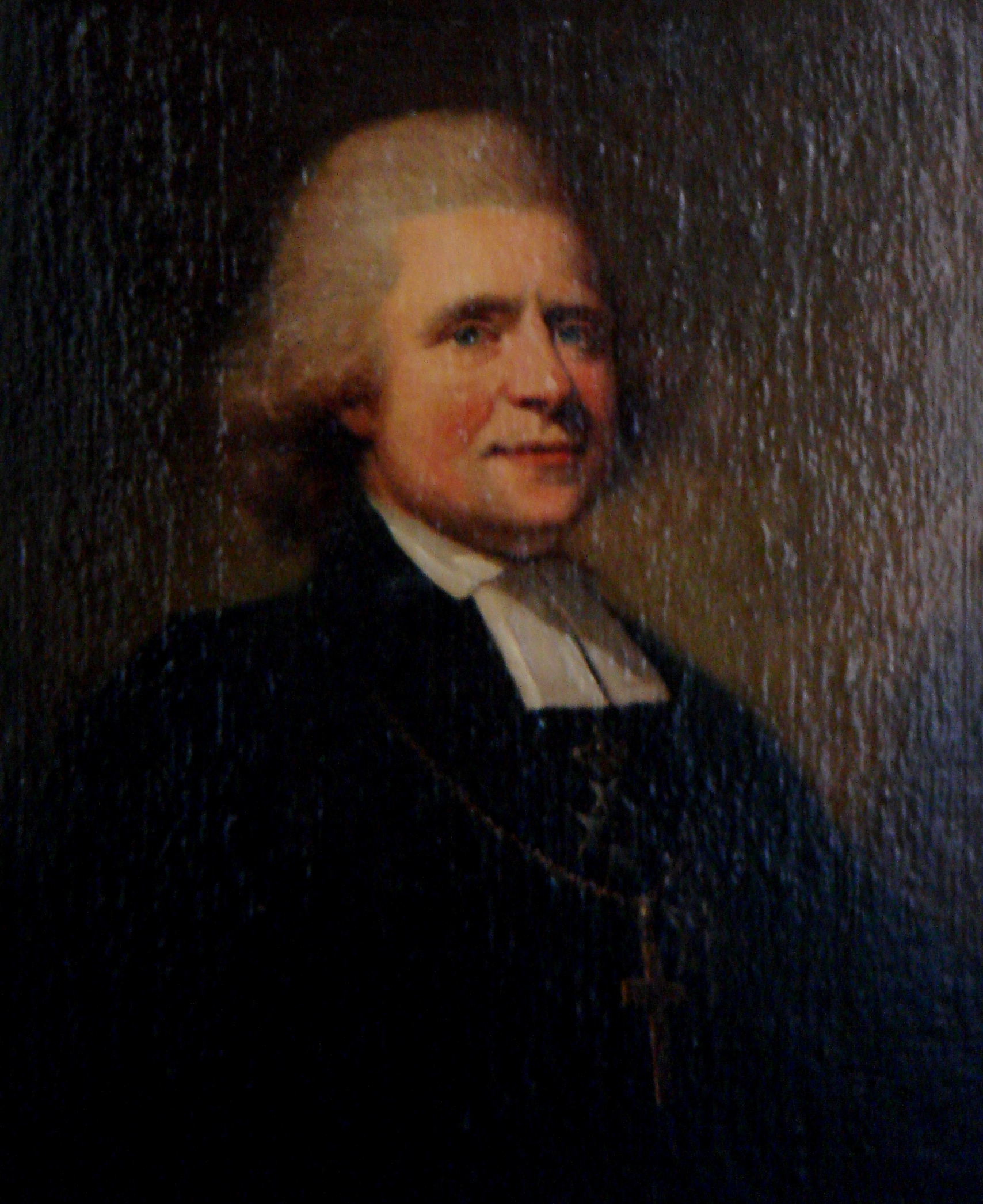
Carl Gustaf Nordin.

Carl Gustaf Nordin (born 2 January 1749 in Stockholm, died 14 March 1812 in Härnösand) was a Swedish statesman, historian and ecclesiastic.

== Early life ==
In 1774, he was made docent of Gothic antiquities at Uppsala University in consequence of his treatise, "Monumenta svia-gothica vetustioris aevi falso meritoque suspecta".

When he was summoned to Stockholm in 1782 by Gustav III of Sweden to edit a Swedish Corpus diplomaticum, half an hour's private conversation with the young priest convinced Gustav that Nordin's proper place was in the political arena. But he employed Nordin quite differently from his episcopal colleague Olof Wallqvist. While the bishop publicly defended the royal measures, Nordin became the king's private adviser. In politics Nordin was a royalist. To him, a parliament seemed little better than a mob. He was one of the king's secret managers during the troublesome and dangerous Riksdag of 1789, but advised caution and compared the estate of clergy, which at one time held the balance between the jarring orders, to ice which might be walked upon but could not be driven over.

Nordin was appointed a member of an ecclesiastical commission for reforming the church in 1787, in which capacity he was virtually minister of public worship. Between 1791 and 1792 he became a leading member of the financial and general committees of the Riksdag.

== Bishop ==
After the king's death Nordin shared in the general disgrace of the Gustavians and lived in retirement at the little town of Härnösand, where he held the post of lector at the gymnasium. But he reappeared prominently on the political scene during the Riksdag of 1800, and in 1805 was consecrated bishop of Härnösand.

== Scholar ==
Though he lacked the brilliant qualities of his rival Wallqvist, Nordin had the same alertness and penetration, and was more stable and disinterested. One of the most learned men of his day, he devoted his spare time to history, and discovered that many of the oldest and most cherished Scandinavian manuscripts were clever forgeries. Like Jean Hardouin he got to believe that a great deal of what is called classical literature was compiled by anonymous authors at a much later date, and he used frequently to startle his colleagues, the Gustavian academicians, by his audacious paradoxes.

Nordin left behind him a colossal collection of manuscripts, the so-called Nordinska Samlingarna, which were purchased and presented to Upsala University by Charles XIV John and form the groundwork of the Scriptores rerum Suecicarum medii aevi.

Nordin published during his lifetime Handlingar till uplysning af svenska krigshistorien (Stockholm, 1787–1788). His academical addresses came out at Stockholm in 1818 under the title Minnen öfver namnkunniga svenska män, His Dagbok or Diary did not appear until 1868.

Nordin was one of the original members of the Swedish Academy.

Cultural offices
Preceded by First holder	Swedish Academy, Seat No.15; 1786–1812	Succeeded by Carl Birger Rutström
