= Peder Swart =

Peder Swart (Latin: Petrus Niger; died 1562) was bishop of Västerås, Gustav Vasa's chronicler and historian. He was originally called Peder Andræ, the surname "Swart" is a later addition, a name used by his sons.

== Biography ==
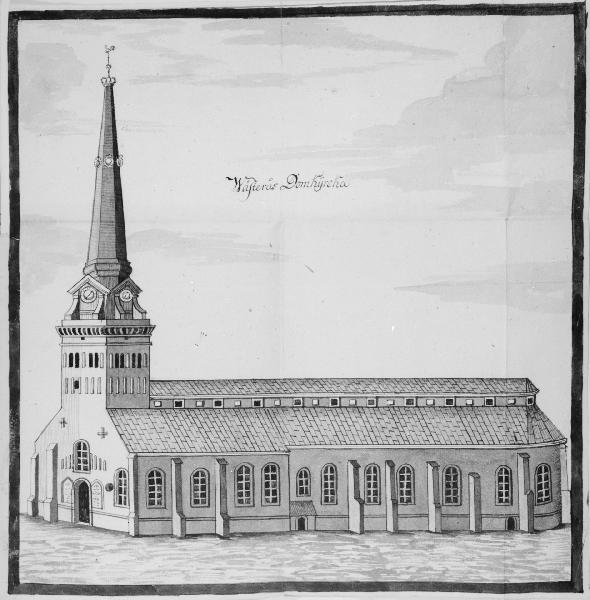
Västerås Cathedral

Little is known about his origins, although he is believed to have come from the area around Västerås. He is first mentioned in 1539 when he is recorded as being in charge of church-tax collections in Västerås. Between 1540 and 1546 he was bailiff to the king and the bishop. By 1541 at the latest he became a canon, by 1543 at the latest a vicar, and by 1544 at the latest a preacher in Västerås. Between 1545 and 1550 he was schoolmaster in Västerås and from 1546 to 1549 provost in Tuhundra provostship. Probably in 1550 he became chaplain to Gustav Vasa, delivered the funeral sermon for Margareta Leijonhufvud, and in 1552 handled negotiations with the dissenting bishops in connection with Gustav Vasa's desire to remarry his former wife's niece Katarina Stenbock. From 1554 he was exempted from tax on his farm Fläka in Lundby parish, and in 1557 he was appointed bishop of Västerås diocese.

Swart died in 1562 and was buried on October 5 of the same year in Västerås Cathedral.

== Writings ==
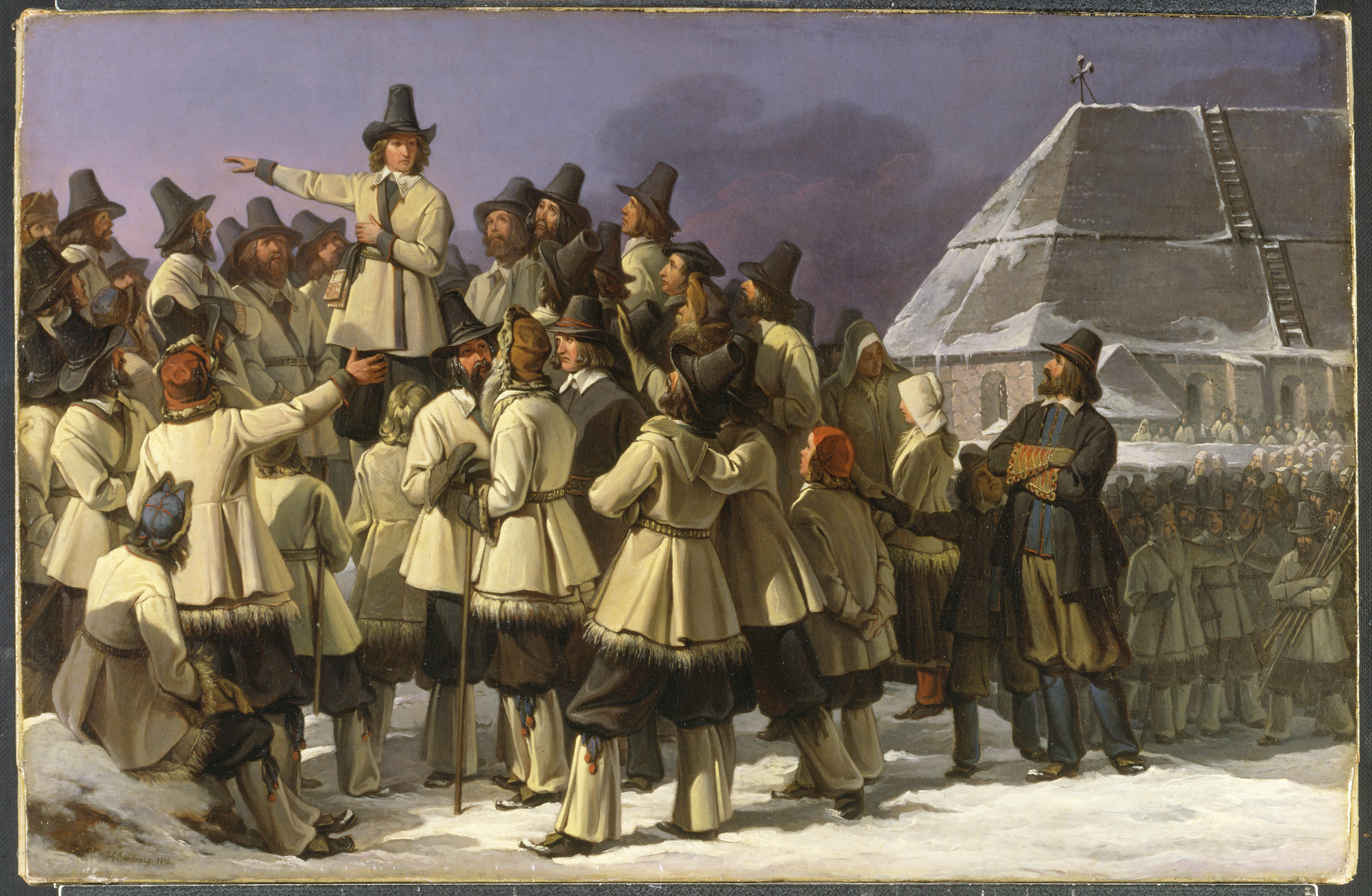
Gustav Vasa urging the peasants to rebel against the Danes

Together with Gustav Vasa, Peder Swart wrote the poem Gensvaret (The Response), an answer to The Danish Rhyme Chronicle, which was published in 1558.

Gustav Vasa wanted to control what was written about him, so when he first had the opportunity to read Olaus Petri's newly written chronicle in 1556, he was furious. He immediately demanded that all copies that could be found should be sent to him and any more printing stopped. He then instead gave the task to Peder Swart, who authored a chronicle of his life up to 1534, when his son, Eric, was born.

Parts of the narrative may have been written according to the king's own dictation, but the written directives about what the narrative should contain that Olaus Petri had previously received were probably also used. Among other things, it depicts the reformation parliament in Västerås in 1527, as well as a couple of the king's adventures in Dalarna. The chronicle gave posterity the image that Gustav Vasa desired, namely as a father of the country who cared for his people. The chronicle is a well-composed piece of literature, but is not considered historically reliable.

The work attributed to Peder Swart known as Peder Swart's episcopal chronicle for Västerås diocese is considered to be a forgery made in the 17th century by Hedemora provost Nils Rabenius.

== Family ==
Peder Swart was married to Brita Larsdotter. Together they had the following children:

- Andreas Petri Arosiensis, dean in Västerås parish
- Israel Petri Niger (Israel Pettersson Svart) (died 1614), parish priest in Tillberga parish
- Catharina Swart who was married to parish priest Christophorus Germundi in Odensvi parish.

== Bibliography ==
- Ahnlund, Nils (1927). Nils Rabenius (1648-1717) : Studier i svensk historiografi (in Swedish). Stockholm: Gebers.
- Larsson, Lars-Olof (2002). Gustav Vasa – landsfader eller tyrann? (in Swedish). Stockholm: Prisma. ISBN 91-518-3904-0.
- Muncktell, Johan Fredric; Westin, Jacob (1844). Westerås stifts herdaminne D. 1 (in Swedish). Upsala: Wahlström & Låstbom.
- Westin, Gunnar T. "Peder Andreæ (Svart)". Svenskt biografiskt lexikon (in Swedish).
- Åstrand, Göran (1999). Här vilar berömda svenskar (in Swedish). Bromma: Ordalaget Bokförlag.
