= Rudbeck =

Surname

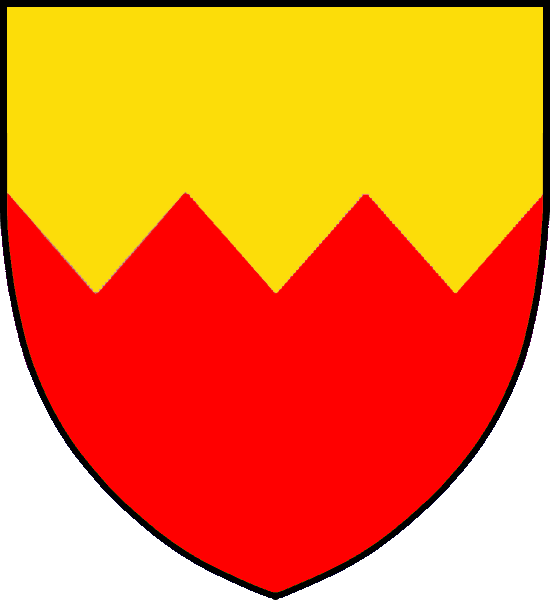
Coat of arms of the Rudbeck family

The Rudbeckuis family, in three different branches, Rudbeck, Rudebeck and von Rudbeck is a Swedish noble family, originating from Northern Schleswig. They were ennobled in 1719 by Queen Ulrika Eleanora, 1692 by King Carl XI and in 1776 awarded with the title of Baron in Sweden. The family is related to the Nobel family.

== Notable members ==
- Johannes Rudbeckius (1581–1646), Bishop at Västerås, Sweden, from 1619 until his death
- Olaus Rudbeck (1630–1702), Swedish scientist and writer, professor of medicine at Uppsala University, son of Bishop Johannes Rudbeck at Västerås
- Olof Rudbeck the Younger (1660–1740), Swedish explorer and scientist, son of Olaus Rudbeck Sr., ennobled 1719 by Queen Ulrika Eleanora.
