= Gustaf Murray =

19th-century Swedish bishop

The Right Reverend Gustaf Murray
- Bishop of Västerås
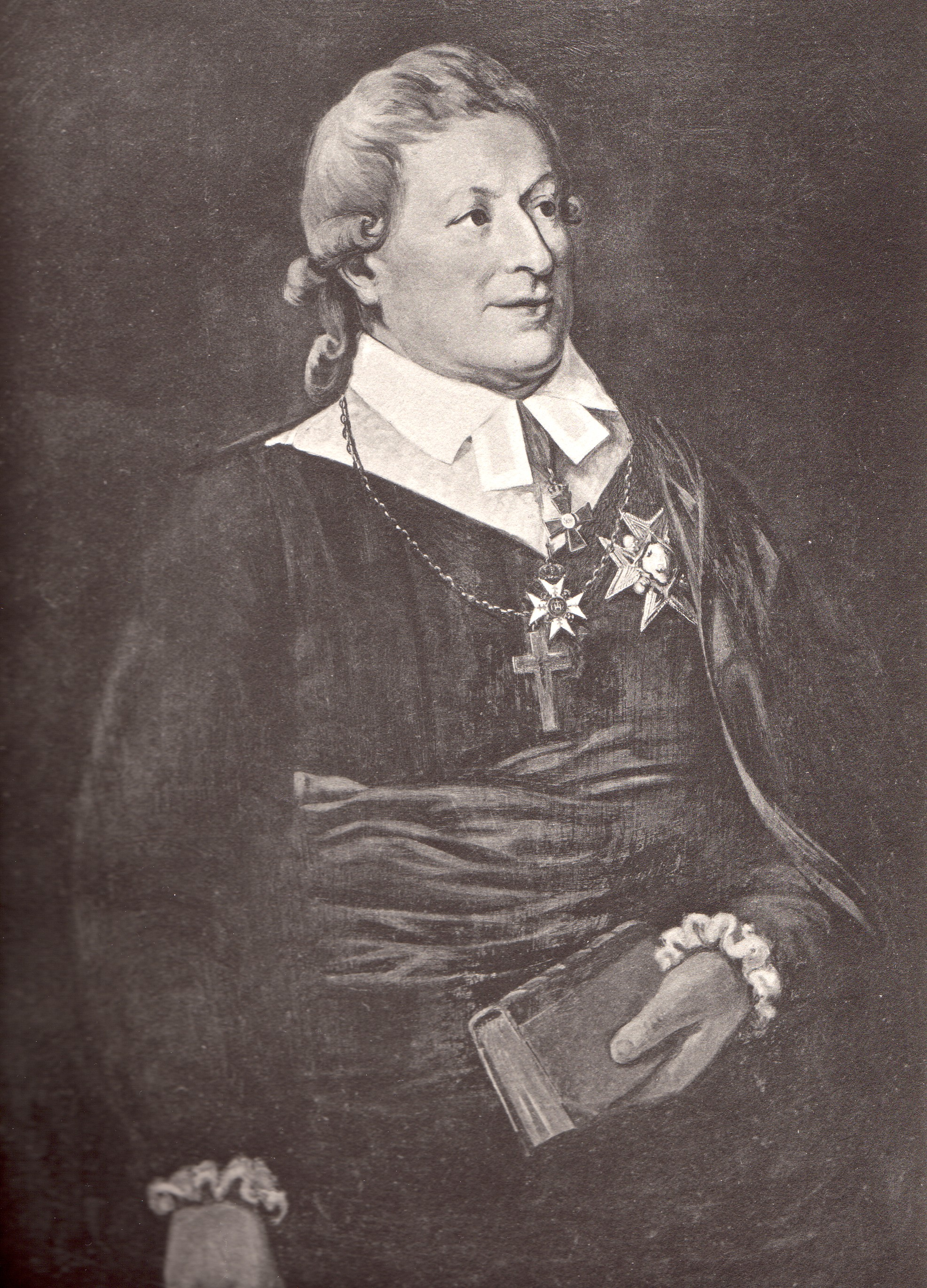
- Gustaf Murray by Peter Krafft
- Diocese: Diocese of Västerås
- Predecessor: Eric Waller
- Successor: Sven Wijkman Casparsson

Personal details
- Born: 28 March 1747; Stockholm, Sweden
- Died: 4 May 1825 (aged 78); Västerås, Sweden
- Occupation: Lutheran Pastor

Gustaf Murray (28 March 1747 – 4 May 1825) was Bishop of Västerås in Sweden from 1811 to 1825.

== Biography ==
Murray was born on 28 March 1747 in Stockholm, son of the Prussian-born preacher and theologian Andreas Murray (1695–1771). His brothers were the professors Johann Philipp Murray (1726–1776), Johan Anders Murray (1740–1791) and Adolph Murray (1751–1803).

In 1760 Gustaf Murray became a student in Uppsala, and in 1768 became a Master of Philosophy in Göttingen. He was ordained in 1770, and for the next four years was an assistant minister at the German church in Stockholm. In 1771 Murray was one of the founders of the Christian education society Pro Fide et Christianismo, also serving as its president. In 1774 he was made the court chaplain of Duke Charles, the future Charles XIII of Sweden. In 1778 he became a Doctor of Divinity, and in 1780 pastor of the Jakobs and Johannes parishes in Stockholm. In 1793 he was a member of the Committee for improving the Church handbook, hymn book and catechism. As a pastor he worked extensively for the relief of the poor. He established a voluntary workhouse, organized collections and arranged for free practical education and gifts of clothing and footwear for the children of poor families.

In 1801 Murray was promoted to first pastor and vicar of Great Church Assembly. In 1809, after the political revolution, he was made the court preacher and nominal bishop. He was knighted in 1810 and in 1811 was appointed Bishop of the Diocese of Västerås. Gustaf Murray died on 4 May 1825 in Västerås. His children were Gustaf Anders (1784–1824), Carl Erik (1786–1870), Charlotta Wilhelmina (1788–1858), Sophia Lovisa (b. 1790), Axel Wilhelm (1794–1796), Augusta Sophia (1796–1828), Johanna Lovisa (1798–1858) and Johan Jacob (1800–1870).
