= Pro Fide et Christianismo =

Swedish Christian association

- Abbreviation: PFetCh
- Formation: 27 March 1771; 254 years ago
- Founder: Carl Magnus Wrangel
- Purpose: Christian education
- Official language: Swedish
- President: Oloph Bexell
- Website: https://www.profide.nu

Pro Fide et Christianismo (full name Societas svecana pro fide et christianismo, lit. 'the Swedish society for faith and Christian life') is a Christian association within the Church of Sweden. The organization was an "informal or semi-official national school board" prior to the founding of Sweden's public education system and made a significant impact on Sweden's early education system.

== History ==
Based on the model of the Society for Promoting Christian Knowledge, the society was founded on 27 March 1771 on the initiative of Carl Magnus Wrangel (1727–1786), a priest in service to the royal court (överhovpredikant). After a nine-year position as pastor of Gloria Dei Church in Philadelphia, in which he had "been preparing the way for Methodism in Philadelphia" and contact with Methodist John Wesley, he felt the necessity to found an organization to "[propagate] practical religion", with a promise of support from Wesley. Its motto was "A society, which with utmost diligence should promote the growth and spread of Christianity in the Kingdom of Sweden". The society, with its Pietist influence, was to serve as a platform for the spread of Christian faith and knowledge through the ideas of Christian enlightenment, education, mission and temperance during its early years, as well as a counter to neology in the state church. It has been called Sweden's first missionary and tract society. Its goal was to "work against the decline of Christian knowledge and civic virtues".

At a time when the view of the state and its responsibilities did not allow for state intervention in public education and enlightenment, the society carried out voluntarily what it considered the time required, but which the state was unable to carry out. Its ideas later became generally accepted and were gradually taken over in part by other organizations. The society is thus the earliest surviving example of how Swedish civil society began to take shape.

The society's work was divided into two divisions, the education division and the pastoral or catechism division. It grew quickly in the beginning, with 76 members in the first year, 23 of whom lived in Finland and Pomerania and 28 in other countries. Expenses were paid partly by voluntary contributions from members (after 1819, annual fees were paid by each member) and partly by quite substantial donations.

=== Education ===
The society became a pioneer in public education in Sweden, advocating for education covering both religious and broad general subjects at a time when most parish schools provided a basic education. It rewarded teachers and helped found libraries. In 1777 the society established a total of five catechist schools in Stockholm to provide Christian education "to persons over 15 years of age who do not have adequate knowledge of Christianity, and to children who, accepted for service in factories or in handicrafts, or for whatever reasons lack the opportunity for daily schooling". The schools were intended to compensate for inadequate home schooling. A number of clergy positions, younger priests, were employed as teachers at these schools and known as catechists.

In addition, from 1841, classes were established for older children who could not read, eventually reaching a total of six. In 1875 they were discontinued. After the discontinuation of the school, the catechism classes were composed mostly of developmentally disabled children, who were prepared for their first Communion.

Over the years, the catechism division underwent modernization in various ways, but survived and was transferred to the Stockholm parish delegate in 1965. It was also involved in mission activities in Lappmarken and supported the publication of Lexicon Lapponicum, a Sami-Swedish dictionary, in the 1770s.

=== Publishing ===
Early on, the society focused on publishing Christian literature and tracts and supporting the distribution of Christian scripture, either on its own or through other means. It was inspired by the work of the British Society for the Diffusion of Useful Knowledge and Society for the Propagation of the Gospel in Foreign Parts.

One of the society's main tasks was to provide textbooks: there was a need for textbooks covering a broad range of subjects for popular education. The best known of its published textbooks is Kronprinsens Barnabok (1780; facsimile edition 1983) with illustrations by Jacob Gillberg, based on a German children's textbook and dedicated to Crown Prince Gustaf Adolf. For a long time efforts were made to produce a new catechism; this attempt, however, ran aground.

The scripture committee awarded prizes to encourage good contributions on contemporary religious questions, and distributed short, easy-to-read sermons ("Sunday Friends") to those whose occupations prevented them from attending Sunday worship, such as carriage and tram drivers, to meet the spiritual needs of these workers. The committee also published "Guides to the study of the New Testament", prepared by a number of young priests, for Bible study especially in church youth associations.

Pro Fide et Christianismo published material on what they saw as the issues of the day, including "declining church attendance and communion frequency ... growing deism and atheism ... extravagance in food and drink ... and 'enthusiasm'". Religious biographic portrayals, such as deathbed conversion stories, including of a Sami girl were also published – in which case the complete account was not published due to the controversy of portraying a person's last moments.

The society published books by Johann Arndt, Martin Luther, Peter Fjellstedt, Hans Magnus Melin, Elis Heüman, and others.

In the 1940s, the society published a new translation of the Lutheran Book of Concord.

=== Impact ===
Pro Fide et Christianismo initiated the founding of several societies: the Swedish Missionary Society, the Swedish Bible Society, the Exchange Teaching Society (växelundervisningssällskapet), the Society for the Diffusion of Useful Knowledge (Sällskapet för nyttiga kunskapers spridande), and, at least indirectly, provided the impetus for the establishment of normal schools. The society also contributed to the founding of the Regina School in Anjala, Finland, one of the country's first public schools – as well as its library, the first in Finland.

=== Today ===
Today, the society's main task is to provide financial support for the publication and dissemination of Christian literature. It financially supports the Nordic peer-reviewed academic journal Theofilos. It also awards scholarships to students of theology. It has approximately 200 members. Pro Fide et Christianismo is Sweden's oldest existing Christian association.

== Members ==
Members of the organization include:

- Abraham Bäck
- Carl Jesper Benzelius
- Bernhard von Beskow
- Einar Billing
- Ebbe Gustaf Bring
- Anders Chydenius
- Matthias Calonius
- Karl Fredrik Dahlgren
- Frans Michael Franzén
- Anders Fryxell
- Jakob Gadolin
- Erik Gustaf Geijer
- Erik Laxmann
- Carl Herman Levin
- Jakob Tengström
- Carl Fredrik Mennander
- Georg Friedrich Seiler
- Rabbe Gottlieb Wrede

Honorary members include Henry Muehlenberg, John Wesley, and Arne Fjellbu.

== Presidents ==
The current president is professor Oloph Bexell. Presidents of the society have included the following, in addition to its founder Carl Magnus Wrangel:

- bishop Georg Claes Schröder
- privy council member Fredrik Sparre
- bishop Olof Celsius the Younger
- priest of the royal court Gabriel Rosén
- chancellor of justice Joakim Vilhelm Liliestråle
- archbishop Uno von Troil
- privy council member Malte Ramel
- ordensbiskop (bishop appointed by the king) Carl Edvard Taube
- bishop Olof Wallquist
- bishop Gustaf Murray
- bishop Magnus Lehnberg
- prime minister of justice Mattias Rosenblad
- pastor primarius Peter Samuel Drysén
- secretary of state Nils von Rosenstein
- bishop Johan Jacob Hedrén
- archbishop Johan Olof Wallin
- archbishop Carl Fredrik af Wingård
- pastor primarius Carl Peter Hagberg
- pastor primarius Abraham Zacharias Pettersson
- pastor primarius Carl Magnus Fallenius
- education minister Fredrik Ferdinand Carlson
- ordensbiskop Frithiof Grafström
- vicar Albert Wilhelm Staaff
- education minister Nils Claëson
- pastor primarius Johan Fredrik Håhl
- vicar Axel Landquist
- supreme court justice Gabriel Thulin
- priest of the royal court Olle Nystedt
- bishop Helge Ljungberg
- dean Robert Murray
- priest of the royal court Carl Henrik Martling
- professor Oloph Bexell (sv)
