= Hammar, Askersund =

Hammar
- Location within Örebro Location within Sweden
- Coordinates: 58°49′N 14°57′E
- Country: Sweden
- Province: Närke
- County: Örebro County
- Municipality: Askersund Municipality

Area
  - Total: 0.65 km^{2} (0.25 sq mi)

Population (31 December 2010)
  - Total: 282
  - Density: 435/km^{2} (1,130/sq mi)
- Time zone: UTC+1 (CET)
  - Summer (DST): UTC+2 (CEST)

Hammar is a locality situated in Askersund Municipality, Örebro County, Sweden with 282 inhabitants in 2010.
