= Olof Rudbeck the Younger =

Swedish explorer and biologist (1660–1740)

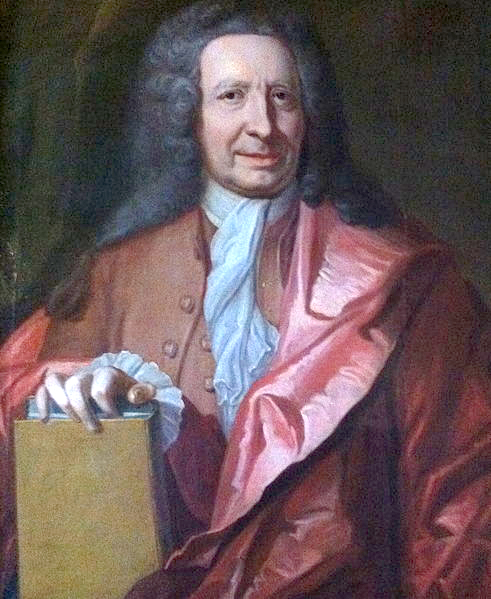
Olof Rudbeck d.y. (1660–1740). Oil-painted portrait in Uppsala University's Universitethuset

Olof Rudbeck the Younger or Olaus Rudbeckius d.y. (15 March 1660 – 23 March 1740) was a Swedish explorer, scientist, botanist, ornithologist and rector of Uppsala University.

== Biography ==
Olof Rudbeck was born in Uppsala, Sweden, the son of Olaus Rudbeck Sr. (1630–1702), a professor of medicine at Uppsala University. He travelled to England, Holland and Germany in 1687 to study botany. Rudbeck took a medical degree at the Utrecht University in 1690. Returning to his home country in 1692, he succeeded his father as professor of medicine at Uppsala University. Serving alongside Lars Roberg (1664–1742), he specialized in anatomy, botany, zoology, and pharmacology, while Roberg gave lectures in medicine, surgery, physiology and chemistry.

He travelled to Lapland in 1695, joining an expedition commissioned by the King Charles XI of Sweden (1655–1697), for which his mission was to study nature, the mountainous region in particular. He returned and published Lapponia illustrata, an album of beautifully colored pictures of birds, flowers and scenery, for which he is best remembered. At the beginning of the eighteenth century, Rudbeck turned his attention away from nature studies to speculation about the relationship between Sami languages to Finnish and Hungarian.

To honour his accomplishments (and posthumously, those of his namesake father), he was ennobled in 1719 by Queen Ulrika Eleonora, Queen of Sweden (1688–1741), as a "naturalized nobleman" (noble family of Rudbeck, nr. 1637). His student, the botanist Carl Linnaeus (1707–1778), named a genus of flowers Rudbeckia in honor of him and his father. Rudbeck helped his father with his botanical work, Campi elysii, including making woodblocks for the life-sized woodcut illustrations of many of the species were included in the two volumes that were published, together with his father Olof, his two sisters, Johanna Christina and Wendela, and other colleagues. It is thought that about 3,200 woodblocks were cut for the series, and those remaining today (about 140 from volume 1) are housed at the Linnean Society of London.

The plant genus Rudbeckia was named by Linnaeus in honor of both Rudbeck and his son.

== Personal life ==
Rudbeck was married three times. Rudbeck had 24 children with three wives. His sister, Wendela, married Peter Olai Nobelius, and from them descends the Nobel family, including Ludvig Nobel, founder of Branobel and Alfred Nobel, founder of the Nobel Prizes.

== Other sources ==
- Krook, Hans (1988) Olof Rudbeck d.y:s Svenska fåglar (Stockholm : Coeckelberghs) ISBN 91-7640-250-9
