= Adolph Murray =

Swedish anatomist

Adolf Murray
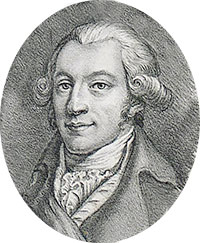
- Lithography 1847
- Born: 13 February 1751; Stockholm, Sweden
- Died: 4 April 1803 (aged 52); Uppsala, Sweden
- Occupation: Physician
- Known for: Anatomy

Adolph (Adolf) Murray (13 February 1751 – 4 May 1803) was a Swedish anatomist.

== Biography ==
Adolph Murray was born on 13 February 1751 in Stockholm, Sweden. He was the youngest son of the Prussian-born preacher and theologian Andreas Murray (1695 - 1771). His brothers were the professors Johann Philipp Murray (1726–1776) and Johann Andreas Murray (1740–1791), and the Bishop Gustaf Murray (1747–1825).

In 1764 Adolph Murray became a student in Uppsala, and soon became devoted to anatomy. He was a pupil of Carl Linnaeus. At the age of 19 his professor gave him permission to give public lectures on anatomy in Stockholm. In 1772 he received his PhD from Uppsala. Adolph Murray then undertook a foreign field trip, returning in 1776. While he was away, he was appointed Professor of Anatomy and Surgery at Uppsala University. Linnaeus had supported this appointment. He was one of the university's most prominent teachers, and made valuable contributions to science.

Adolph Murray died in Uppsala on 4 May 1803. He had been a firm royalist. His son, Carl Adolph Murray, was to become American consul in Gothenburg.

== Bibliography ==
Murray published many papers on medical subjects. His longer works include:

- Murray, Adolf (1794). Adolphi Murray Descriptio Arteriarvm Corporis Humani: In Tabulas Redacta; in Usus Discentium. Beerius.
- Forster, Johann Reinhold; Murray, Adolf (1799). Testacéologie.
