= Allium griffithianum =

Scientific classification
- Kingdom: Plantae
- Clade: Tracheophytes
- Clade: Angiosperms
- Clade: Monocots
- Order: Asparagales
- Family: Amaryllidaceae
- Subfamily: Allioideae
- Genus: Allium
- Species: A. griffithianum

Binomial name
- Allium griffithianum Boiss.

Synonyms
- Allium bahri Regel; Allium jacquemontii var. grandiflorum (Boiss.) Aswal; Allium kuschakewiczii Regel; Allium rubellum var. grandiflorum Boiss.; Allium tenue Regel; Allium tschulpias Regel

Species of plant

Allium griffithianum is a species of flowering plant in the family Amaryllidaceae. It is an onion found in the high mountains of Pakistan, Afghanistan, Kyrgyzstan, Uzbekistan and Tajikistan. It is a perennial herb up to 40 cm tall, with a hemispherical umbel of flowers, white or light pink or pale purple.
