= Johan Andreas Murray =

Swedish physician and botanist

Johan Andreas (Anders) Murray
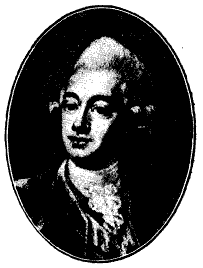
- Born: 27 January 1740; Stockholm, Sweden
- Died: 22 May 1791 (aged 51); Göttingen, Germany
- Occupations: Physician, Botanist
- Known for: Research into phytochemicals

Johan Andreas (Anders) Murray (27 January 1740 – 22 May 1791) was a Swedish physician of German descent and botanist, who published a major work on plant-derived medicines.

== Biography ==
Johan Anders Murray was born in Stockholm on 27 January 1740, son of the Prussian-born preacher and theologian Andreas Murray (1695 - 1771). His brothers were the professors Johann Philipp Murray (1726-1776) and Adolph Murray (1751-1803), and the Bishop Gustaf Murray (1747-1825).

Murray studied from 1756-1759 in Uppsala, where he was taught by Carl Linnaeus. In 1760, he went to Göttingen, where he became a doctor of medicine in 1763. In 1769, he was appointed professor and director of the botanical garden. He led investigations into the chemical properties of plants, at that time a main interest of botanists, and into the ways in which plant-derived compounds could be prepared and administered as supposed medicines.

In 1791, Murray was elected a member of the American Philosophical Society. Murray died in Göttingen on 22 May 1791.

== Work ==
Murray was a prominent pharmacologist and botanist. His work Apparatus medicaminum (1776–92) in six volumes, of which the last was published only after his death, is a comprehensive compilation of herbal remedies. Its full title is Apparatus medicaminum tam simplicium quam præparatorum et compositorum in praxeos adiumentum consideratus, meaning ‘The Formulation of Medicines as Simple as Prepared and Arranged in Practice and Careful Aid’.

In addition, he published German translations of numerous writings by Swedish physicians. In 1774 he published the 13th edition of Linnaeus's Systema Naturæ under the title Systema Vegetabilium (‘System of the Vegetable Kingdom’), with an introduction he wrote himself called Regnum Vegetabile (‘The Vegetable Kingdom’). The standard botanical abbreviation for this is Syst. Veg.. A fourteenth edition was published in 1784.

== Legacy ==
The citrus genus Murraya is named for Johan Andreas Murray.

== Partial bibliography ==
Murray was the author of many treatises and translations, which included:

- Murray, Johann Andreas (1765). Commentatio De Arbuto Uva Ursi: Exhibens Descriptionem Eius Botanicam Analysin Chemicam Eiusque In Medicina Et Oeconomia Varium Usum. Pockwitzius Et Barmeierus.Digital edition by the University and State Library Düsseldorf
- Murray, Johann Andreas (1769). De Vermibus In Lepra Obviis: Iuncta Leprosi Historia Et De Lumbricorum Setis Observationes Reg. Societati Scientiarum Gotting. Praelectae Cum Figuris Aeneis. Dieterich.
- Murray, Johan Anders (1770). Prodromvs designationis stirpivm Gottingensivm. J. C. Dieterich.
- Murray, Johann Andreas (1773). Enumeratio librorum praecipuorum medici argumenti. Weygand.
- Linné, Carl von (1774). Murray, Johann Andreas (ed.). Systema vegetabilium (13th edition of Systema Naturae) (2 vols.). Göttingen: Typis et impensis Jo. Christ. Dieterich.
  - Linné, Carl von (1785) [1774]. Systema vegetabilium (13th edition of Systema Naturae) [A System of Vegetables 2 vols.]. Lichfield: Lichfield Botanical Society.
- Linné, Carl von (1784). Murray, Johann Andreas (ed.). Systema vegetabilium (14th edition of Systema Naturae). Typis et impensis Jo. Christ. Dieterich.
  - 15th edition 1797
- Murray, Johann Andreas; Seger, Ludwig Christian (1785). Arzneyvorrath.
- Murray, Johann Andreas (1785). J. Andreae Murray ... Opuscula, in quibus commentationes varias, tam medicas, quam ad rem naturalem spectantes, retractavit, emendavit, auxit.
- Murray, Johann Andreas (1794). Apparatus medicaminum tam simplicium quam praeparatorum et compositorum in praxeos adiumentum consideratus ... auctore Jo. Andrea Murray.
