= Eva Bexell =

Swedish author of children's books

- Born: 1945 (age 80–81); Åseda, Sweden
- Occupation: Children's author

Eva Bexell (born 1945) is a Swedish author of children's books. She debuted in 1976 with the book Prostens barnbarn. Her books have been translated to Danish, English, Finnish, Japanese, Norwegian and German, and as of November 2007, sold over 560,000 copies.

The three books with morfar prosten has been released as audio books, with Margaretha Krook as narrator. Prostens barnbarn and Kalabalik hos morfar prosten was broadcast as a radio series in 1975, and Opp och hoppa, morfar prosten! was recorded in 1992.

== Bibliography ==
- 1976: Prostens barnbarn ISBN 978-91-0-041232-6
- 1978: Kalabalik hos morfar prosten ISBN 91-0-042123-5
- 1980: En vän är en vän ISBN 91-48-50417-3
- 1983: Flickan i gullregnsträdet ISBN 91-48-50756-3
- 1987: Opp och hoppa, morfar prosten! ISBN 91-48-51493-4
- 1989: Olycksfågeln Evert ISBN 91-48-51673-2
- 1992: Evert i ny knipa ISBN 91-48-52007-1
- 1998: Ser du inte hur det ryker ur skorstenen? ISBN 91-638-0661-4

Source: Nationalencyklopedin

A collection edition, Boken om morfar prosten (ISBN 9148517283), was published in 1989. It includes the three books about morfar prosten: Prostens barnbarn, Kalabalik hos morfar prosten and Opp och hoppa, morfar prosten!.

== Awards ==
- 1987: BMF-plaketten (children's book)
- 2003: Emilpriset
