= Diocese of Västerås =

Diocese of the Church of Sweden

Diocese of Västerås Diocesis Arosiensis Västerås stift
- Arms of the diocese of Västerås

- Flag

Location
- Country: Sweden
- Deaneries: 9 kontrakt
- Coordinates: 59°36′45″N 16°32′28″E

Statistics
- Parishes: 59
- Congregations: 77

Information
- Denomination: Church of Sweden
- Established: 12th century
- Cathedral: Västerås Cathedral

Current leadership
- Bishop: Mikael Mogren
- Metropolitan Archbishop: Antje Jackelén

Map

Website
- svenskakyrkan.se/vasterasstift

The Diocese of Västerås (Swedish: Västerås stift) is a diocese within the Church of Sweden. Its Episcopal see is located in Västerås at Västerås Cathedral. The diocese was first established in the 12th century as part of the Roman Catholic church, but was made part of the Church of Sweden as a result of the Protestant Reformation in Sweden.

== History ==
The diocese existed as a Catholic diocese from the 11th to the 16th century. The see was founded at Munktorp, then moved about 1100 to Västerås by the English Cluniac missionary David of Munktorp, who was Bishop of Västerå, and one of the patron saints of Västerås Cathedral.

Before 1118 the Diocese of Sigtuna was divided into the Diocese of Uppsala and that of Västerås. In 1134, Henry, Bishop of Sigtuna was transferred to Västerås. Heathenism was not extinct by 1182. Charles (1257–1277) was a great benefactor, and Israel Erlandsson, O.S.B. (1260–1332; bishop, 1309–1332), mined copper in Dalecarlia and wrote "De Vita et Miraculis S. Erici" (Ser. rev. Svec., II, I, 272-276).

Otto (1501–1522) completed the Västerås Cathedral. Peder Sunnanväder (1522–1523), formerly chancellor to Sten Sture the Elder, was executed for alleged treason in 1527. The last Catholic bishop, Petrus Magni (1524–1534), is supposed to have been consecrated 1 May 1524 in Rome. In 1527 a Diet was held at Västerås which Protestantized the Church of Sweden and separated it from the Holy See in Rome. Petrus Magni consecrated various bishops in 1528 and 1531 under protest. Though subjected latterly to humiliating tutelage by King Gustav I of Sweden, he retained the see until his death. The Dalecarlians rose repeatedly in defence of their religion, but were overcome by the cunning and violence of Gustav I.

The cathedral of Västerås and the parish church of Mora were the only important churches in the diocese. At Västerås there was a Dominican convent (founded 1234) and a Hospital of the Holy Spirit (founded 1345). Munktorp Abbey was extinct before 1318. The Cistercian Abbey of Husby (Gudsberga kloster, Mons Domini) in Dalecarlia, founded in 1477, and colonized from Alvastra Abbey in 1486, lasted until 1544.

== Gallery ==
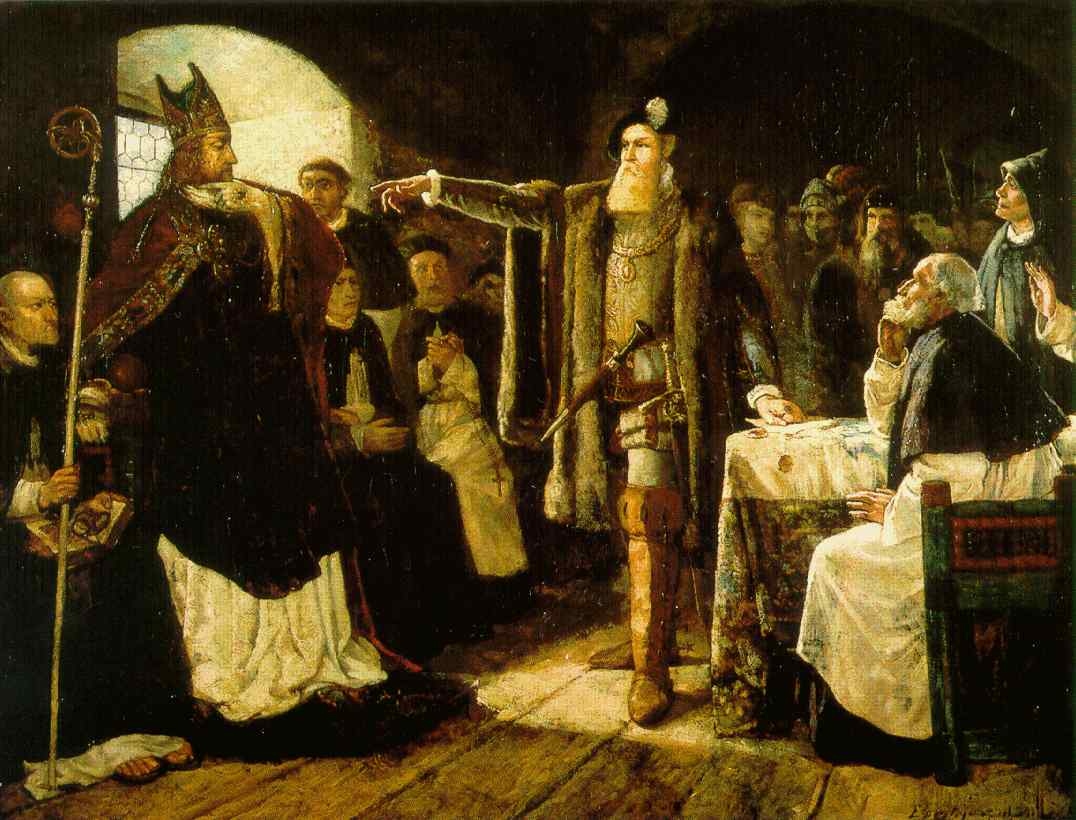
Gustaf Vasa accuses Peder Sunnanväder before the chapter in Västerås; Ernst Josephson

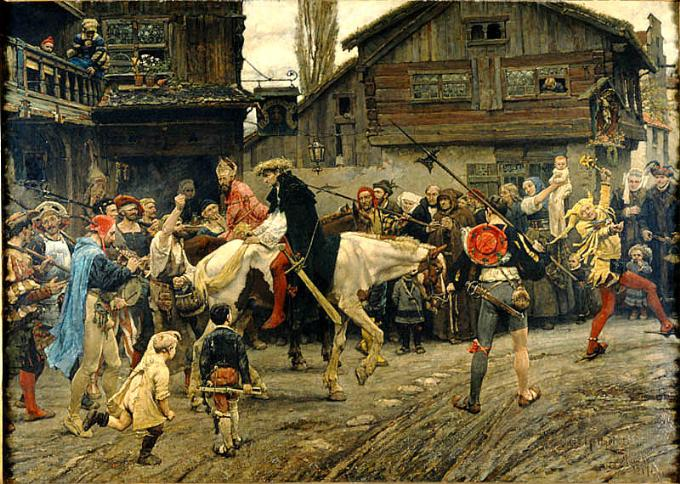
Peder Sunnanväder's and Mäster Knut's Ignominious Entry into Stockholm 1526; Carl Gustaf Hellqvist

== See also ==
- List of bishops of Västerås
