= List of current knights of the Order of the Seraphim =

This is a list of the current knights (men) and members (women) of the Royal Order of the Seraphim, a Swedish order of chivalry.

== Colour pattern ==
....................	Living Swedish Royal Knight or Member
....................	Living Foreign Royal Knight or Member
....................	Living Foreign Republican Knight or Member

== Europe ==
=== Royal family of Sweden ===
Gustaf V (1907–1950)
Nr	Date	Image	Name	Title	Country	Motto	Stallplate
700	30 April 1946 (birth)		Carl XVI Gustaf (born 1946)	Duke of Jämtland (1946–1973); Prince of Sweden (1946–1950); Crown Prince of Sweden (1950–1973); King of Sweden (1973–present)	Sweden	För Sverige i tiden	
Gustaf VI Adolf (1950–1973)
Nr	Date	Image	Name	Title	Country	Motto	Stallplate
714	22 March 1952		Margaretha (born 1934)	Princess of Sweden	Sweden		
717	22 March 1952		Christina (born 1943)	Princess of Sweden	Sweden		
Carl XVI Gustaf (1973–present)				Princess of Sweden	Sweden		
Nr	Date	Image	Name	Title	Country	Motto	Remarque
782	6 May 1976		Silvia (born 1943)	Queen consort of Sweden (1976–present)	Sweden; Germany		
784	14 July 1995		Victoria (born 1977)	Princess of Sweden (1977–1980); Crown Princess of Sweden (1980–present); Duchess of Västergötland	Sweden		
786	13 May 1997		Carl Philip (born 1979)	Crown Prince of Sweden (1979); Prince of Sweden (1980–present); Duke of Värmland	Sweden		
797	10 June 2000		Madeleine (born 1982)	Princess of Sweden; Duchess of Hälsingland and Gästrikland	Sweden		
858	19 June 2010		Daniel (born 1973)	Prince of Sweden (2010–present); Duke of Västergötland (2010–present)	Sweden		
861	23 February 2012		Estelle (born 2012)	Princess of Sweden; Duchess of Östergötland	Sweden		
866	20 February 2014		Leonore (born 2014)	Princess of Sweden; Duchess of Gotland	Sweden		
869	13 June 2015		Sofia (born 1984)	Princess of Sweden (2015–present); Duchess of Värmland (2015–present)	Sweden		
870	15 June 2015		Nicolas (born 2015)	Prince of Sweden; Duke of Ångermanland	Sweden		
873	2 March 2016		Oscar (born 2016)	Prince of Sweden; Duke of Skåne	Sweden		
874	19 April 2016		Alexander (born 2016)	Prince of Sweden; Duke of Södermanland	Sweden		
878	31 August 2017		Gabriel (born 2017)	Prince of Sweden; Duke of Dalarna	Sweden		
880	9 March 2018		Adrienne (born 2018)	Princess of Sweden; Duchess of Blekinge	Sweden		
881	26 March 2021		Julian (born 2021)	Prince of Sweden; Duke of Halland	Sweden		
882	7 February 2025		Ines (born 2025)	Princess of Sweden; Duchess of Västerbotten	Sweden		

=== Austria ===
Carl XVI Gustaf (1973–present)
Nr	Date	Image	Name	Title	Country	Motto	Stallplate
851	20 November 2007		Heinz Fischer (born 1938)	President of Austria (2004–2016)	Austria		

=== Belgium ===
Gustaf VI Adolf (1950–1973)
Nr	Date	Image	Name	Title	Country	Motto	Stallplate
762	31 March 1966		Albert II (born 1934)	King of the Belgians (1993–2013)	Belgium	L'Union fait la Force	
Carl XVI Gustaf (1973–present)
814	18 March 1994		Paola (born 1937)	Queen consort of the Belgians (1993–2013)	Belgium	L'Union fait la Force	
833	26 April 2001		Philippe (born 1960)	King of the Belgians (2013–present)	Belgium	L'Union fait la Force	

=== Bulgaria ===
Carl XVI Gustaf (1973–present)
Nr	Date	Image	Name	Title	Country	Motto	Stallplate
832	27 October 2000		Petar Stoyanov (born 1952)	President of Bulgaria (1997–2002)	Bulgaria		
850	25 September 2007		Georgi Parvanov (born 1957)	President of Bulgaria (2002–2012)	Bulgaria		

=== Croatia ===
Carl XVI Gustaf (1973–present)
Nr	Date	Image	Name	Title	Country	Motto	Stallplate
865	8 April 2013		Ivo Josipović (born 1957)	President of Croatia (2010–2015)	Croatia		

=== Denmark ===
Gustaf VI Adolf (1950–1973)
Nr	Date	Image	Name	Title	Country	Motto	Stallplate
735	10 April 1958		Margrethe II (born 1940)	Princess of Denmark (1940–1972); Heir presumptive of Denmark (1953–1972); Queen of Denmark (1972–2024); Former Queen since 2024	Denmark	Guds hjælp, Folkets kærlighed, Danmarks styrke	Frederik IX of Denmark's daughter
Carl XVI Gustaf (1973–present)
809	2 June 1993		Frederik X (born 1968)	Crown Prince of Denmark (1972–2024); King of Denmark (2024–present)	Denmark	Forbundne, forpligtet, for kongeriget Danmark	
890	6 May 2024		Mary (born 1972)	Queen consort of Denmark (2024–present)	Denmark		

=== Estonia ===
Carl XVI Gustaf (1973–present)
Nr	Date	Image	Name	Title	Country	Motto	Remarque
859	18 January 2011		Toomas Hendrik Ilves (born 1953)	President of Estonia (2006–2016)	Estonia		
887	2 May 2023		Alar Karis	President of Estonia; 2021–present	Estonia		

=== Finland ===
Carl XVI Gustaf (1973–present)
Nr	Date	Image	Name	Title	Country	Motto	Remarque
830	10 April 2000		Tarja Halonen (born 1943)	President of Finland (2000–2012)	Finland	Yhteisen kansan puolesta	
862	17 April 2012		Sauli Niinistö (born 1948)	President of Finland (2012–2024)	Finland	Juurista voimaa	
889	23 April 2024		Alexander Stubb	President of Finland; 2024–present	Finland		

=== France ===
Carl XVI Gustaf (1973–present)
Nr	Date	Image	Name	Title	Country	Motto	Stallplate
868	2 December 2014		François Hollande (born 1954)	President of France (2012–2017)	France		
888	30 January 2024		Emmanuel Macron (born 1977)	President of France (2017−present)	France		

=== Germany ===
Carl XVI Gustaf (1973–present)
Nr	Date	Image	Name	Title	Country	Motto	Remarque
876	5 October 2016		Joachim Gauck (born 1940)	President of Germany (2012–2017)	Germany		
884	7 September 2021		Frank-Walter Steinmeier (born 1956)	President of Germany (2017–present)	Germany		

=== Greece ===
Carl XVI Gustaf (1973–present)
Nr	Date	Image	Name	Title	Country	Motto	Remarque
Rem : Sophia : see Spain

=== Iceland ===
Carl XVI Gustaf (1973–present)
Nr	Date	Image	Name	Title	Country	Motto	Remarque
795	8 October 1981		Vigdís Finnbogadóttir (born 1930)	President of Iceland (1980–1996)	Iceland		Got the chain 11 June 1987.
826	19 November 1998		Ólafur Ragnar Grímsson (born 1943)	President of Iceland (1996–2016)	Iceland	Vires Islandiae	
879	18 January 2018		Guðni Thorlacius Jóhannesson (born 1968)	President of Iceland (2016–2024)	Iceland		
891	6 May 2025		Halla Tómasdóttir (born 1968)	President of Iceland (2024–present)	Iceland		

=== Italy ===
Carl XVI Gustaf (1973–present)
Nr	Date	Image	Name	Title	Country	Motto	Remarque
881	13 November 2018		Sergio Mattarella (born 1941)	President of Italy (2015–present)	Italy		

=== Latvia ===
Carl XVI Gustaf (1973–present)
Nr	Date	Image	Name	Title	Country	Motto	Stallplate
817	12 October 1995		Guntis Ulmanis (born 1939)	President of Latvia (1993–1999)	Latvia		
846	31 March 2005		Vaira Vīķe-Freiberga (born 1937)	President of Latvia (1999–2007)	Latvia		
867	26 March 2014		Andris Bērziņš (born 1944)	President of Latvia (2011–2015)	Latvia		

=== Lithuania ===
Carl XVI Gustaf (1973–present)
Nr	Date	Image	Name	Title	Country	Motto	Remarque
871	7 October 2015		Dalia Grybauskaitė (born 1956)	President of Lithuania (2009–2019)	Lithuania		

=== Luxembourg ===
Carl XVI Gustaf (1973–present)
799	12 September 1983	Henri (born 1955)	Grand Duke of Luxembourg (2000–2025)	Luxembourg	Je maintiendrai
853	15 April 2008	Maria Teresa (born 1956)	Grand Duchess consort of Luxembourg (2000–2025)	Luxembourg	

=== Netherlands ===
Carl XVI Gustaf (1973–present)
Nr	Date	Image	Name	Title	Country	Motto	Remarque
783	6 October 1976		Beatrix (born 1938)	Queen of the Netherlands (1980–2013), Princess of the Netherlands (1938–1980, 2013–present)	Netherlands	Je maintiendrai (Arms)	
812	24 November 1993		Willem-Alexander (born 1967)	King of the Netherlands (2013–present)	Netherlands	Je maintiendrai	
886	11 October 2022		Queen Máxima of the Netherlands	Queen of the Netherlands (2013–present)	Netherlands		

=== Norway ===
Carl XVI Gustaf (1973–present)
776	26 December 1974	Sonja (born 1937)	Queen consort of Norway (1991–2026)	Norway		1st Member by Carl XVI Gustaf
810	2 June 1993	Haakon VIII (born 1973)	Crown Prince of Norway (1991–2026); King of Norway (2026–present)	Norway	Alt for Norge	

=== Poland ===
Carl XVI Gustaf (1973–present)
Nr	Date	Image	Name	Title	Country	Motto	Remarque
811	16 September 1993		Lech Wałęsa (born 1943)	President of Poland (1990–1995)	Poland	Odwaznie roztropnie	
860	4 May 2011		Bronisław Komorowski (born 1952)	President of Poland (2010–2015)	Poland	Frangas Non Flectes	

=== Portugal ===
Carl XVI Gustaf (1973–present)
Nr	Date	Image	Name	Title	Country	Motto	Arms
854	5 May 2008		Aníbal Cavaco Silva (born 1939)	President of Portugal (2006–2016)	Portugal		

=== Romania ===
Carl XVI Gustaf (1973–present)
Nr	Date	Image	Name	Title	Country	Motto	Arms
852	11 March 2008		Traian Băsescu (born 1951)	President of Romania (2004–2014)			

=== Slovakia ===
Carl XVI Gustaf (1973–present)
Nr	Date	Image	Name	Title	Country	Motto	Stallplate
834	21 March 2002		Rudolf Schuster (born 1934)	President of Slovakia (1999–2004)	Slovakia		

=== Spain ===
Carl XVI Gustaf (1973–present)
Nr	Date	Image	Name	Title	Country	Motto	Remarque
787	5 October 1979		Juan Carlos I (born 1938)	King of Spain (1975–2014)	Spain	Nec plus ultra	
788	5 October 1979		Sophia (born 1938)	Queen consort of Spain (1975–2014); Princess of Greece & Denmark	Spain; Kingdom of Greece		
808	17 December 1991		Felipe VI (born 1968)	Infante of Spain (1968–2014); Prince of Asturias (1977–2014); Heir apparent to the Spanish throne (1975–2014); King of Spain (2014–present)	Spain		
885	24 November 2021		Letizia (born 1972)	Queen consort of Spain (2014–present)	Spain		

=== Turkey ===
Carl XVI Gustaf (1973–present)
Nr	Date	Image	Name	Title	Country	Motto	Stallplate
864	11 March 2013		Abdullah Gül (born 1950)	President of Turkey (2007–2014)	Turkey		

=== Ukraine ===
Carl XVI Gustaf (1973–present)
Nr	Date	Image	Name	Title	Country	Motto	Stallplate
827	23 March 1999		Leonid Kuchma (born 1938)	President of Ukraine (1994–2005)	Ukraine		
856	October 2008		Viktor Yushchenko (born 1954)	President of Ukraine (2005–2010)	Ukraine		

=== United Kingdom ===
Carl XVI Gustaf (1973–present)
779	23 May 1975	Charles III (born 1948)	Prince of the United Kingdom (1948–2022); Heir apparent to the British throne (1952–2022); Prince of Wales (1958–2022); Duke of Cornwall and Rothesay (1952–2022); Duke of Edinburgh (2021–2022); King of the United Kingdom and the other Commonwealth realms (2022–present)	United Kingdom	Dieu et mon droit

== The Americas ==
=== Brazil ===
Carl XVI Gustaf (1973–present)
Nr	Date	Image	Name	Title	Country	Motto	Stallplate
849	13 March 2009		Luiz Inácio Lula da Silva (born 1945)	President of Brazil (2003–2010, 2023–present)	Brazil		

=== Chile ===
Carl XVI Gustaf (1973–present)
Nr	Date	Image	Name	Title	Country	Motto	Stallplate
821	15 November 1996		Eduardo Frei Ruiz-Tagle (born 1942)	President of Chile (1994–2000)	Chile	Por la razón o la fuerza	
875	9 May 2016		Michelle Bachelet (born 1951)	President of Chile (2006–2010, 2014–2018)	Chile	Incluir para crecer	

=== Mexico ===
Carl XVI Gustaf (1973–present)
Nr	Date	Image	Name	Title	Country	Motto	Remarque
835	22 October 2002		Vicente Fox (born 1942)	President of Mexico (2000–2006)	Mexico		

== Africa ==
=== Ethiopia ===
Gustaf VI Adolf (1950–1973)
Nr	Date	Image	Name	Title	Country	Motto	Remarque
742	19 December 1959		Mahisente (born 1937)	Princess of Ethiopia	Ethiopia		Widow of Sahle Selassie

== Asia ==
=== Bhutan ===
Carl XVI Gustaf (1973–present)
Nr	Date	Image	Name	Title	Country	Motto	Remarque
	1994		Jigme Singye Wangchuck (born 1955)	King of Bhutan (1972–2006)	Bhutan		

=== Brunei ===
Carl XVI Gustaf (1973–present)
Nr	Date	Image	Name	Title	Country	Motto	Stallplate
843	8 February 2004		Hassanal Bolkiah (born 1946)	Sultan of Brunei (1967–present)	Brunei		
844	8 February 2004		Pengiran Anak Saleha (born 1946)	Queen consort of Brunei (1967–present)	Brunei		

=== Indonesia ===
Carl XVI Gustaf (1973–present)
Nr	Date	Image	Name	Title	Country	Motto	Remarque
877	22 May 2017		Joko Widodo (born 1961)	President of Indonesia (2014–2024)	Indonesia	Bhinneka Tunggal Ika	

=== Iran ===
Gustaf VI Adolf (1950–1973)
Nr	Date	Image	Name	Title	Country	Motto	Remarque
745	29 April 1960		Farah (born 1938)	Shahbanu of Iran (1961–1979)	Iran		
769	24 August 1970		Reza Pahlavi (born 1960)	Crown Prince of Iran (1960–1979)	Iran		

=== Japan ===
Gustaf VI Adolf (1950–1973)
Nr	Date	Image	Name	Title	Country	Motto	Remarque
721	30 September 1952		Akihito (born 1933)	Crown Prince of Japan (1933–1989); Emperor of Japan (1989–2019); Emperor Emeritus of Japan (2019–present)	Japan		
Carl XVI Gustaf (1973–present)
831	18 May 2000		Michiko (born 1934)	Crown Princess consort of Japan (1959–1989); Empress consort of Japan (1989–2019); Empress Emerita of Japan (2019–present)	Japan		
848	16 March 2007		Naruhito (born 1960)	Crown Prince of Japan (1989–2019) Emperor of Japan (2019–present)	Japan		

=== Jordan ===
Carl XVI Gustaf (1973–present)
Nr	Date	Image	Name	Title	Country	Motto	Stallplate
806	15 September 1989		Noor (born 1951)	Queen consort of Jordan (1978–1999)	Jordan		
841	26 September 2003		Abdullah II (born 1962)	King of Jordan(1999–present)	Jordan		
842	26 September 2003		Rania (born 1970)	Queen consort of Jordan (1999–present)	Jordan		Abdullah II's wife

=== Malaysia ===
Nr	Date	Image	Name	Title	Country	Motto	Notes
Carl XVI Gustaf (1973–)
847	8 September 2005		Sirajuddin of Perlis	King of Malaysia (2001–2006)	Malaysia	Bersekutu Bertambah Mutu	

=== South Korea ===
Carl XVI Gustaf (1973–present)
Nr	Date	Image	Name	Title	Country	Motto	Remarque
863	30 May 2012		Lee Myung-bak (born 1941)	President of South Korea (2008–2013)	South Korea		
881	14 June 2019		Moon Jae-in (born 1953)	President of South Korea (2017–2022)	South Korea		

=== Thailand ===
Nr	Date	Image	Name	Title	Country	Motto	Remarque
Carl XVI Gustaf (1973–present)
836	25 February 2003		Vajiralongkorn (born 1952)	Crown Prince of Thailand (1972–2016); King of Thailand (2016–present)	Thailand		
837	25 February 2003		Sirindhorn (born 1955)	Princess Royal of Thailand (1977–present)	Thailand		
838	25 February 2003		Chulabhorn (born 1957)	Princess of Thailand; Princess Srisavangavadhana (2019–present)	Thailand		

== See also ==
- List of knights of the Order of the Seraphim

== Sources ==
- Per Nordenvall, Kungliga Serafimerorden 1748-1998 (1998)
