= List of knights of the Order of the Seraphim =

This is a list of the knights (men) and members (women) of the Royal Order of the Seraphim:

== Color pattern ==
....................	Deceased Swedish Royal Knight or Member
....................	Living Swedish Royal Knight or Member
....................	Deceased Foreign Royal Knight or Member
....................	Living Foreign Royal Knight or Member
....................	Deceased Foreign Presidential Knight or Member
....................	Living Foreign Presidential Knight or Member

== Sweden ==
=== Royal family of Sweden ===
Nr	Date	Image	Name	Title	Country	Motto	Notes
Frederick I (1748–51), the founder
1	17 April 1748		Frederick I	King of Sweden 1720–51; Landgrave of Hesse-Kassel 1730–51	Sweden; Hesse	I Gud mitt hopp	
2	17 April 1748		Adolf Frederick	Prince-Bishop of Lübeck 1727–50; Crown Prince of Sweden 1743–51; King of Sweden 1751–71	Sweden	Salus publica salus mea	
3	17 April 1748		Gustav III	Crown Prince of Sweden 1751–71; King of Sweden 1771–92	Sweden	Fäderneslandet	
29	26 September 1748		Charles XIII	Prince of Sweden, Duke of Södermanland since 1772; Regent 1792–96; King of Sweden 1809–18; King of Norway 1814–18	Sweden; Norway	Folkets väl min högsta lag	
Gustav III (1771–92)
96	1 November 1778		Gustav IV Adolf	Crown Prince of Sweden 1778–92; King of Sweden 1792–1809	Sweden	Gud och folket	Gustav III's son
103	25 August 1782		Carl Gustav	Prince of Sweden; Duke of Småland	Sweden		Gustav III's son
Gustav IV Adolf (1792–1809)
138	3 July 1798		Carl Adolf	Prince of Sweden	Sweden		Was only 7 days old
140	9 November 1799		Gustav	Crown Prince of Sweden 1799–1809	Sweden		Gustav IV's son
Karl XIII (1809–18)
164	28 December 1809		Charles August (1768–1810)	Prince de Schleswig-Holstein-Sonderburg-Augustenburg; Crown Prince of Sweden 1809–10	Sweden	För lagen och fosterlandet	
169	21 August 1810		Charles XIV John (1763–1844)	Prince of Ponte Corvo; Crown Prince of Sweden (1810–18) and Norway (1814–18); King of Sweden and Norway (1818–44)	Sweden; Norway; France	Folkets kärlek min belöning	
170	26 September 1810		Oscar I (1799–1859)	Prince of Sweden; Duke of Södermanland since 1811; Crown Prince of Sweden and Norway 1818–44; King of Sweden and Norway 1844–59	Sweden; Norway; France	Rätt och sanning	
Karl XIV Johan (1818–44)
234	3 May 1826 (birth)		Charles XV (1826–1872)	Duke of Skåne (1826–59); Prince of Sweden and Norway; Crown Prince of Sweden and Norway 1844–59; King of Sweden and Norway 1859–72	Sweden; Norway	Land skall med lag byggas	Oscar I's son (1st)
239	21 January 1829 (birth)		Oscar II (1829–1907)	Duke of Östergötland (1829–72); Prince of Sweden and Norway; King of Sweden and Norway 1872–1905; King of Sweden 1905–07	Sweden; Norway Sweden	Brödrafolkens väl Sveriges väl (after 1905)	Oscar I's son (3rd)
	24 August 1831 (birth)		August (1831–1873)	Prince of Sweden and Norway; Duke of Dalarna ( lifelong )	Sweden; Norway		Oscar I's son (4th)
Oscar I (1844–59)
339	16 June 1858 (birth)		Gustaf V (1858–1950)	Duke of Värmland (1858–1907); Prince of Sweden and Norway; Crown Prince of Sweden and Norway 1872–1905; Crown Prince of Sweden 1905–07; King of Sweden 1907–50	Sweden; Norway Sweden	Med folket för fosterlandet	Oscar II's son (1st)
Karl XV (1859–72)
349	15 November 1859 (birth)		Oscar (1859–1953)	Duke of Gotland (1859–88); Prince of Sweden and Norway; Prince Bernadotte since 1888; Count Bernadotte of Wisborg since 1892	Sweden; Norway Sweden		Oscar II's son (2nd); Never erased from the register
362	27 February 1861 (birth)		Carl (1861–1951)	Prince of Sweden and Norway; Prince of Sweden 1905 - Duke of Västergötland ( lifelong )	Sweden; Norway Sweden		Oscar II's son (3rd)
386	1 August 1865 (birth)		Eugen (1865–1947)	Prince of Sweden and Norway; Prince of Sweden 1905 - Duke of Närke ( lifelong )	Sweden; Norway Sweden		Oscar II's son (4th)
Oscar II (1872–1907)
466	11 November 1882 (birth)		Gustaf VI Adolf (1882–1973)	Duke of Skåne (1882–1950); Prince of Sweden and Norway; Prince of Sweden 1905–07; Crown Prince of Sweden 1907–50; King of Sweden 1950–73	Sweden; Norway Sweden	Plikten framför allt	Gustaf V's son (1st)
	17 June 1884 (birth)		Wilhelm (1884–1965)	Prince of Sweden and Norway; Prince of Sweden 1905 - Duke of Södermanland ( lifelong )	Sweden; Norway Sweden		Gustaf V's son (2nd)
	20 April 1889 (birth)		Erik (1889–1918)	Prince of Sweden and Norway; Prince of Sweden 1905 - Duke of Västmanland ( lifelong )	Sweden; Norway Sweden		Gustaf V's son (3rd)
566	22 April 1906 (birth)		Gustaf Adolf (1906–1947)	Prince of Sweden; Duke of Västerbotten ( lifelong )	Sweden		Gustaf VI Adolf's son and Carl XVI Gustaf's father
570	7 June 1907 (birth)		Sigvard (1907–2002)	Prince of Sweden, Duke of Uppland 1907–34; Count Bernadotte of Wisborg since 1951	Sweden		Gustaf VI Adolf's son Erased from the register 15 June 1934
Gustaf V (1907–50)
575	28 April 1908		Victoria (1862–1930)	Queen of Sweden	Sweden; Baden		Gustaf V's wife
576	28 April 1908		Sofia (1836–1913)	Dowager Queen of Sweden	Sweden; Nassau		Oscar II's wife and Gustaf V's mother
596	8 May 1909 (birth)		Lennart (1909–2004)	Prince of Sweden, Duke of Småland 1909–32; Count Bernadotte of Wisborg since 1951	Sweden		Erased from the register 15 June 1934
605	10 January 1911 (birth)		Carl (1911–2003)	Prince of Sweden, Duke of Östergötland 1911–37; Prince Bernadotte 1937–2003	Sweden		Erased from the register 16 February 1961
612	28 February 1912 (birth)		Bertil (1912–1997)	Prince of Sweden; Duke of Halland ( lifelong )	Sweden		Gustaf VI Adolf's son
627	31 October 1916 (birth)		Carl Johan (1916–2012)	Prince of Sweden, Duke of Dalarna 1916–46; Count Bernadotte of Wisborg since 1951	Sweden		Gustaf VI Adolf's son Erased from the register 22 February 1946
700	30 April 1946 (birth)		Carl XVI Gustaf (1946–)	Duke of Jämtland 1946–73; Prince of Sweden 1946–50; Crown Prince of Sweden 1950–73; King of Sweden since 1973	Sweden	För Sverige i tiden	
Gustaf VI Adolf (1950–73)
708	29 October 1950		Louise (1889–1965)	Queen of Sweden (consort)	Sweden; United Kingdom		
713	22 March 1952		Sibylla (1908–1972)	Princess of Saxe-Cobourg and Gotha (born); Princess of Sweden, Duchess of Västerbotten (marriage)	Sweden; Saxe-Coburg-GothaUnited Kingdom		
714	22 March 1952		Margaretha (1934–)	Princess of Sweden	Sweden		
715	22 March 1952		Birgitta (1937–2024)	Princess of Sweden (born); Princess of Hohenzollern (marriage)	Sweden		
716	22 March 1952		Désirée (1938–2026)	Princess of Sweden (born); Baroness Silfverschiöld (marriage)	Sweden		
717	22 March 1952		Christina (1943–)	Princess of Sweden	Sweden		
718	22 March 1952		Ingeborg (1878–1958)	Princess of Denmark (born); Princess of Sweden, Duchess of Västergötland (consort)	Sweden; Denmark		Christian X's sister and Frederik IX & Knud's aunt
746	21 May 1960		Ingrid (1910–2000)	Princess of Sweden; Cr. Princess of Denmark 1935–47; Queen of Denmark 1947–72; Dowager Queen 1972–2000	Denmark; Sweden		Frederik IX of Denmark's wife and Margrethe II's mother
761	8 December 1965		Margaretha (1899–1977)	Princess of Sweden (born); Princess of Denmark (marriage)	Denmark; Sweden		Prince Axel of Denmark's wife
Carl XVI Gustaf (1973–)
782	6 May 1976		Silvia (1943–)	Queen of Sweden (consort)	Sweden; Germany		
784	14 July 1995		Victoria (1977–)	Princess of Sweden 1977–80; Crown Prince of Sweden, Duchess of Västergötland since 1980	Sweden		Considered from birth.
786	13 May 1997		Carl Philip (1979–)	Born as Crown Prince of Sweden; Duke of Värmland; Prince of Sweden since 1980	Sweden		Considered from birth.
797	10 June 2000		Madeleine (1982–)	Princess of Sweden; Duchess of Hälsingland and Gästrikland	Sweden		Considered from birth.
815	30 August 1995		Lilian (1915–2013)	Princess of Sweden; Duchess of Halland	Sweden; United Kingdom		On her 80th birthday
858	19 June 2010		Daniel (1973–)	Prince of Sweden; Duke of Västergötand	Sweden		
861	23 February 2012		Estelle (2012–)	Princess of Sweden; Duchess of Östergötland	Sweden		Considered from birth, got insignia at baptism 22 May 2012
866	20 February 2014		Leonore (2014–)	Princess of Sweden; Duchess of Gotland	Sweden		Considered from birth, got insignia at baptism 8 June 2014
869	13 June 2015		Sofia (1984–)	Princess of Sweden; Duchess of Värmland	Sweden		Was given the order at her wedding
870	15 June 2015		Nicolas (2015–)	Prince of Sweden; Duke of Ångermanland	Sweden		Considered from birth, got insignia at baptism 11 October 2015
871	2 March 2016		Oscar (2016–)	Prince of Sweden; Duke of Skåne	Sweden		Considered from birth, got insignia at baptism 27 May 2016
873	19 April 2016		Alexander (2016–)	Prince of Sweden; Duke of Södermanland	Sweden		Considered from birth, got insignia at baptism 9 September 2016
878	31 August 2017		Gabriel (2017–)	Prince of Sweden; Duke of Dalarna	Sweden		Considered from birth, got insignia at baptism 1 December 2017
880	9 March 2018		Adrienne (2018–)	Princess of Sweden; Duchess of Blekinge	Sweden		Considered from birth, got insignia at baptism 8 June 2018
883	26 March 2021		Julian (2021–)	Prince of Sweden; Duke of Halland	Sweden		Considered from birth, got insignia at baptism 14 August 2021
884	7 February 2025		Ines (2025–)	Princess of Sweden; Duchess of Västerbotten	Sweden		Considered from birth, got insignia at baptism 14 June 2025

=== Notable Swedish historical figures ===
==== Frederick I of Sweden (1748–51) ====
Nr	Date	Image	Name	Title	Country	Motto	Notes
Frederick I (1748–51), the founder
4	17 April 1748		Gustaf Bonde	Count; Governor of Östergötland County 1718–21; President of Bergskollegium 1721–27; Privy Council 1727–39	Sweden	Velis contractis	
5	17 April 1748		Ture Gabriel Bielke	Count; General-Major; Privy Council 1727–39	Sweden	Probantur tempestate fortes	
6	17 April 1748		Jakob Cronstedt	Count; Privy Council	Sweden	Mihi cura futuri	
7	17 April 1748		Edvard Didrik Taube	Count; Over-Amiral from 1734; Privy Council 1734–39	Sweden	Nec spe nec metu	
8	17 April 1748		Axel Löwen	Baron, Count from 1751; General of infantry 1737; Privy Council 1739–66	Sweden	Non vana Quæro	
	17 April 1748		Anders Johan von Höpken	Count, 22 July 1762; President of the Chancellery 1752–61; Privy Council 1746–61, 1773–80	Sweden		
13	17 April 1748		Carl Gustaf Tessin	Count; Lord Marshal 1738; Privy Council 1741–61; President of the Chancellery 1746–52	Sweden	Constanter et sincere	
18	17 April 1748		Fabian Wrede	Baron; Privy Council 1746–56	Sweden	Fide et virtute	
23	17 April 1748		Carl Cronstedt	Baron; General of Infantry; Lord High Constable of Sweden	Sweden	Malo quam vincula flammas	

==== Adolf Frederick of Sweden (1751–71) ====
Nr	Date	Image	Name	Title	Country	Motto	Notes
Adolf Frederick (1751–71)
40	25 November 1751		Rutger Fuchs	Baron; General-Major; Governor of Stockholm 1739–53	Sweden	Respice finem	
44	23 November 1752		Carl Fredrik Scheffer	Count and Diplomat	Sweden	Lydnad and frihet	
50	24 November 1754		Karl Ridderstolpe	Baron from 1751; Vice Admiral	Sweden	Et deus et patria testes	
52	24 November 1754		George Bogislaus Staël von Holstein	Baron from 1731 Field Marshal	Sweden	Exemplo Suorum	
54	24 November 1755		Fredrik Vilhelm von Hessenstein	Swedish Prince; Field Marshal	Sweden		Illegitimate son of Frederick I
56	21 November 1757		Carl Lagerberg	Baron from 1758; Privy Council 1755–65	Sweden	Cuique suum	
60	24 November 1760		Adam Horn af Kanckas	Count; Lieutenant-General 1759; Privy Council 1761–69 & 1771	Sweden	Amore honoris	
74	24 November 1766		Axel Lagerbielke	Baron from 1766; Vice Admiral 1758; Privy Council 1765–69	Sweden	Amore legis	
76	1 May 1769		Gustaf David Hamilton	Count; Field Marshal 1765	Sweden	Virtute decet non sanguine nite	
77	1 May 1769		Augustin Ehrensvärd	Count & Field Marshal	Sweden	Oombytelig	
83	26 November 1770		Ulrik Scheffer	Baron, Count from 1771; Privy Council 1769–83; President of the Chancellery 1772–83	Sweden	Nec temere, nec timide	

==== Gustav III of Sweden (1771–92) ====
Nr	Date	Image	Name	Title	Country	Motto	Notes
Gustav III (1771–92)
91	21 November 1774		Fredrik Ribbing	Baron, Count from 1778; Privy Council 1766–69 & 1772	Sweden	Fide radicata	
94	25 November 1776		Gabriel Spens	Count; Field Marshal 1776; Lord of the Realm 1778	Sweden	Pro rege et patriae	
105	1 September 1782		Fredrik Sparre	Baron, Count from 1797; Privy Council 1781–89; Lord High Chancellor 1792–97	Sweden	Fide stabile	
109	22 November 1784		Carl Axel Wachtmeister	Count; Chancellor of Justice 1779–93 & 1796–1809; Lord High Steward and president of Svea Court of Appeal 1787–1809	Sweden	Comite virtute	
116	26 November 1787		Arvid Fredrik Kurck	Baron, Count from 1797; President of Göta Court of Appeal 1781–92; President of Kammarkollegium 1792–1801	Sweden	Quo jus, huc animus	
118	22 November 1790		Philip von Platen (Field Marshal)	Baron from 1797; Governor General of Pomerania 1796–1800; Field Marshal 1799	Sweden	Tout au devoir	Accolade on 28 April 1791
119	22 November 1790		Johan Gabriel Oxenstierna	Count; Privy Council 1786–89; Marshal of the Realm 1792–1801	Sweden	Avito in patriam amore	
122	21 November 1791		Eric Ruuth	Baron, Count from 1792; Lord of the Realm 1792; Governor General of Pomerania 1792–96	Sweden	Conscientia Fretus	Accolade on 28 April 1792 by Regent Duke Karl

==== Gustav IV Adolf of Sweden (1792–1809) ====
Nr	Date	Image	Name	Title	Country	Motto	Notes
Gustav IV Adolf (1792–1809)
126	24 November 1794		Curt von Stedingk	Lord of the Realm 1796; Swedish Noble 1797, Baron 1800, Count 1809; Field Marshal 1811	Sweden		
131	21 November 1796		Wilhelm Mauritz Klingspor	Baron, Count from 1799; Lord of the Realm 1800; Field Marshal 1808; Governor of Stockholm 1809–10	Sweden		
	1799		Axel von Fersen	Count; Generallöjtnant; Ambassador; Lord of the Realm, 1799; Marshal of the Realm 1801–10	Sweden		
146	14 June 1800		Johan Christopher Toll	Baron, Count from 1814; Governor General of Scania 1801–09; Field Marshal 1807	Sweden		
147	8 October 1800		Samuel af Ugglas	Count; Governor of Stockholm County 1787–1802; Governor of Stockholm under 1797 & 1800	Sweden		

==== Charles XIII of Sweden (1809–18) ====
Nr	Date	Image	Name	Title	Country	Motto	Notes
Karl XIII (1809–18)
157	3 July 1809		Johan Liljencrantz	Count; President of the Board of Trade	Sweden	Integre et provide	
161	3 July 1809		Lars von Engeström	Baron 1809; Minister for Foreign Affairs 1809–24; Count 1813	Sweden	Speravit rebus infestis	
	1809		Gustav Wachtmeister	Count; General; Lord of the Realm, 1817	Sweden		
	4 May 1810		Michael Anckarsvärd	Count 1809; Generallöjtnant; County Governor	Sweden		
	23 November 1812		Carl Mörner	Governor of Stockholm; Baron	Sweden		
	23 November 1812		Carl Lagerbring	Count; Cabinet of Sweden	Sweden		
	23 November 1812		Johan af Puke	General Admiral of Royal Fleet; Baron; Cabinet of Sweden	Sweden	Ihärdig och pålitlig	
200	26 September 1815		Georg Frederik von Krogh (1732)	General of Norwegian Army	Sweden	Pro Traditione et Patria	
	1816		Rudolf Cederström	General Admiral of Royal Fleet; Count; Cabinet of Sweden	Sweden		
207	4 July 1817		Anders Fredrik Skjöldebrand	General and Cabinet of Sweden	Sweden	Ausis fausta sidera	

==== Charles XIV John of Sweden (1818–44) ====
Nr	Date	Image	Name	Title	Country	Motto	Notes
Karl XIV Johan (1818–44)
212	11 May 1818		Jacob Axelsson Lindblom	Bishop of the Diocese of Linköping 1786–1805; Archbishop of Uppsala 1805–19	Sweden	Integre ac libere	
214	5 September 1818		Jacob De la Gardie (1768–1842)	Count & General	Sweden		
221	19 June 1823		Carl De Geer (1781–1861)	Count; Cabinet of Sweden	Sweden	Fri and laglydig	
225	14 May 1824		Carl Gustaf Löwenhielm	Count; Cabinet of Sweden	Sweden		
226	23 May 1824		Hans Gabriel Trolle-Wachtmeister	Count; Cabinet of Sweden	Sweden		
265	7 May 1838		Gustaf Algernon Stierneld	Baron; Cabinet of Sweden	Sweden		
266	11 May 1838		Bror Cederström	Baron; Generallöjtnant	Sweden		
276	24 June 1841		Otto Palmstierna	Överstekammarjunkare; Cabinet of Sweden	Sweden		
285	6 February 1843		Ferdinand Carl Maria Wedel-Jarlsberg	Baron	Norway		

==== Oscar I of Sweden (1844–59) ====
Nr	Date	Image	Name	Title	Country	Motto	Notes
Oscar I (1844–59)
294	23 November 1846		Albrecht Elof Ihre	Baron; Minister of Ecclesiastical affairs 1840–42; Minister for Foreign Affairs 1842–46	Sweden	Non præceps iræ	
297	21 August 1847		Frederik Due	Prime Minister of Norway in Stockholm	Norway		
300	28 April 1849		Carl Gustaf Löwenhielm	Count; Generallöjtnant; Chamberlain	Sweden		
301	28 April 1849		Jakob Wilhelm Sprengtporten	Överhovjägmästare, Governor of Stockholm and General Major	Sweden		
308	26 June 1850		Gustaf Adolf Vive Sparre	Count; State Minister of Justice 1848–56; Lord of the Realm 1848	Sweden		
310	26 June 1850		Johan Peter Lefrén	Generallöjtnant; President of War College and Chef of HM the King's Staff	Sweden		
313	4 September 1851		Lars Herman Gyllenhaal	Baron; President of Göta hovrätt State Minister of Justice 1843–44; Lord Marshal 1850	Sweden		
319	28 April 1853		Carl Fredrik Coyet	Admiral and Gentleman of the Chamber	Sweden		
320	28 April 1853		Mauritz Axel Lewenhaupt	Count; Marshal of the Realm; General Major	Sweden	Ad exemplia majorum	
321	28 April 1853		Jørgen Herman Vogt	Prime Minister of Norway in Stockholm	Norway		
323	28 April 1854		Edvard Fredrik von Saltza	High Gentleman of the Chamber	Sweden		
329	28 April 1856		Johan Fredrik Fåhraeus	Cabinet of Sweden and General director of Customs	Sweden	Firmitate fideque	
335	24 November 1856		Elias Lagerheim	Minister for Foreign Affairs 1856–58	Sweden	Ex patrum exemplis	
337	9 March 1858		Henning Hamilton	Count; Governor of and one of "The Eighteen"	Sweden		
342	20 September 1858		Carl von und zu Mansbach	General Major and Envoy	Sweden		
340	12 July 1858		Ludvig Manderström	Member of the Swedish Academy and Foreign Minister	Sweden		

==== Charles XV of Sweden (1859–72) ====
Nr	Date	Image	Name	Title	Country	Motto	Notes
Karl XV (1859–72)
348	4 November 1859		Ferdinand Braunerhielm	Master of the Court Mews	Sweden		
350	23 December 1859		Gustaf af Nordin	Envoy, General Major and Chamberlain	Sweden		
351	5 May 1860		Louis de Geer	Baron; Prime Minister of Sweden 1876–80	Sweden		
353	5 May 1860		Eric Gabriel von Rosén	Count; President of hovrätt	Sweden		
354	5 May 1860		Henrik Reuterdahl	Archbishop of Uppsala	Sweden		
361	28 January 1861		Bernhard von Beskow	Member of Swedish Academy	Sweden		
368	28 January 1862		Johan August Gripenstedt	Baron; Minister of Finance 1856–66	Sweden		
372	3 May 1863		Frederik Stang	State Minister of Norway	Norway		
374	7 August 1863		Gustaf Adolf Fredrik Wilhelm von Essen	Count; Master of the Court Mews, General Major	Sweden		
378	3 May 1864		Georg Sibbern	Prime Minister of Norway in Stockholm	Norway		
379	3 May 1864		Olof Immanuel von Fåhraeus	Cabinet of Sweden	Sweden		
387	21 June 1866		Gustaf Lagerbjelke	Count and Län Governor	Sweden		
388	28 January 1867		Baltzar von Platen (1804-1875)	Cabinet of Sweden, Counter admiral	Sweden		
397	29 July 1869		Carl Wachtmeister (politician)	Cabinet of Sweden	Sweden		
398	29 July 1869		Magnus Björnstjerna (statsråd)	Minister for Defence 1858–62; Generallöjtnant from 1867	Sweden		

==== Oscar II of Sweden (1872–1907) ====
Nr	Date	Image	Name	Title	Country	Motto	Notes
Oscar II (1872–1907)
404	1 December 1872		Axel Gustav Adlercreutz	Justice Council 1860–68; President of Göta hovrätt 1868–74; Minister of Justice 1870–74; Governor of Malmöhus County 1874–80	Sweden		
405	1 December 1872		Fabian Jakob Wrede	Baron; Generallöjtnant	Sweden		
409	12 May 1873		Gillis Bildt	Baron; Governor of Stockholm 1862–74; Marshal of the Realm 1886–88; Prime Minister 1888–89	Sweden		
410	12 May 1873		Anton Niklas Sundberg	Archbishop of Uppsala	Sweden		
	12 May 1873		Carl Göran Mörner	Cabinet of Sweden	Sweden		
422	1 December 1874		Oscar Björnstjerna	General Major; Foreign Minister 1872–80	Sweden		
434	1 December 1875		Gustaf af Ugglas	Baron; Governor of Östergötland County 1858–67; Minister of Finance 1867–70; Governor of Stockholm 1874–88	Sweden		
440	1 December 1877		Gerhard Lagerstråle	Cabinet of Sweden	Sweden		
443	30 November 1878		Carl Jedvard Bonde	Baron; High Chamberlain	Sweden		
444	30 November 1878		Samuel August Sandels	Count; Hofmarschall and General	Sweden		
445	21 January 1879		Otto Richard Kierulf	Prime Minister of Norway in Stockholm	Norway		
448	15 May 1879		Carl Johan Thyselius	Prime Minister 1883–84	Sweden	Det meniga bästa	
459	1 October 1881		Arvid Posse	Prime Minister 1880–83; President of the Administrative Court of Appeal 1883–89	Sweden		
460	1 October 1881		Carl Fredrik Hochschild	Baron; Foreign Minister 1880–85	Sweden		
479	1 December 1885		Albert Ehrensvärd	Governor of County of Gothenburg and Bohus 1864–85; Foreign Minister 1885–89	Sweden	Non vana sequor	
480	1 December 1885		Pehr von Ehrenheim	University Chancellor and one of The Eighteen	Sweden		
482	1 December 1886		Robert Themptander	Prime Minister 1884–88; Governor of Stockholm County 1888–96	Sweden		
486	1 December 1887		Carl-Magnus Björnstjerna	Count & Master of the Court Mews	Sweden		
487	1 December 1887		John Berg (politician)	Hovrätt President	Sweden		
495	1 December 1888		Henrik Lovén	Hovrätt President	Sweden		
502	1 December 1890		Carl Gustaf von Otter	Sjöminister	Sweden		
503	1 December 1890		Gunnar Wennerberg	Minister of Ecclesiastic Affairs 1870–75 & 1888–91; Governor of Kronoberg County 1875–88	Sweden		
505	15 May 1891		Abraham Leijonhufvud	Sjöminister	Sweden		
516	15 May 1895		Fredrik von Essen	Baron; Minister of Finance 1888–94; Marshal of the Realm 1894–1911	Sweden		
	21 January 1896		Gustaf Sparre	Count and Speaker	Sweden		
	18 September 1897		Victor Ankarcrona	High Court Huntmaster	Sweden		
534	18 September 1897		Lars Åkerhielm d.y.	Hovrätt President	Sweden		
537	21 January 1898		Ludvig Douglas	Count; Foreign Minister 1895–99; Governor of Östergötland County 1901–11; Marshal of the Realm 1911–16	Sweden		
538	21 January 1898		Gregers Gram	Prime Minister of Norway in Stockholm 1889–91 & 1893–98	Norway	Patria cara carior libertas	
541	9 July 1900		Alfred Lagerheim	Foreign Minister 1899–1904; General Director för National Board of Trade 1905–13	Sweden	Mod and tålamod	
542	9 July 1900		Claës Gustaf Adolf Tamm	Baron; Minister of Finance 1886–88; Governor of Stockholm 1888–1902	Sweden	Dum spiro spero	
544	1 December 1900		Fredrik von Otter	Baron; Minister for Defence 1874–80; Prime Minister 1900–02	Sweden		
547	30 November 1901		Erik Piper	Count and High Master of the Court Mews	Sweden		
551	1 December 1902		Gustaf Peyron Jr	Baron; Grand Chamberlain and Generallöjtnant	Sweden	Rätt and pligt	
552	1 December 1903		Hjalmar Klintberg	Admiral; Head of the Fleet crew 1889–1903	Sweden		
557	1 December 1904		Axel Rappe	War Minister	Sweden		
558	1 December 1904		Gustaf Gilljam	Cabinet of Sweden and University Chancellor	Sweden		
562	6 November 1905		Christian Lundeberg	Member of First Chamber 1886–1911; Prime Minister in 1905	Sweden		
563	1 December 1905		Erik Elliot	Chancellor of Justice 1886–1910; President of Svea hovrätt 1899–1910	Sweden		
564	1 December 1905		Hemming Gadd	General; Chief of His Majesty's Military Staff 1905–07	Sweden	Swedish soldat! Swedish styrka!	
569	6 June 1907		Hjalmar Palmstierna	General Major; Minister for Defence 1888–92; Governor of Jönköping County 1892–1906	Sweden	För gud, konung and fosterland	

==== Gustaf V of Sweden (1907–50) ====
Nr	Date	Image	Name	Title	Country	Motto	Notes
Gustaf V (1907–50)
585	16 June 1908		Arvid Lindman	Prime Minister	Sweden	I arbete för fosterlandet	
586	16 June 1908		Eric Trolle	Foreign Minister	Sweden		
597	5 June 1909		Axel Swartling	Speaker of the Second Chamber	Sweden		
603	6 June 1910		Arvid Taube	Foreign Minister	Sweden		
604	6 June 1910		Ivar Afzelius	Hovrätt President	Sweden		
611	1 January 1912		Robert Dickson (1843–1924)	Governor of Stockholm 1902–11	Sweden		
613	6 June 1912		Fredrik Wachtmeister	University Chancellor, Foreign Minister	Sweden		
621	6 June 1913		Johan August Ekman	Archbishop of Uppsala	Sweden		
624	30 September 1916		Gustaf Uggla	General	Sweden		
625	6 June 1916		Hjalmar Hammarskjöld	Prime Minister	Sweden		
626	6 June 1916		Knut Agathon Wallenberg	Foreign Minister	Sweden	Quaere et invenies	
629	6 June 1918		Otto Hack Roland Printzsköld	Governor of Södermanland County 1889–94; Marshal of the Realm 1916–30	Sweden		
630	6 June 1918		Hugo E. G. Hamilton	Count; Civil Service Minister 1907–11; Speaker of First Chamber 1916–28	Sweden		
631	2 January 1919		Edvard Brändström	Envoy, Generallöjtnant	Sweden	Probantur tempestate fortes	
636	11 June 1919		Knut Gillis Bildt	General	Sweden		
638	5 June 1920		Carl Swartz	Minister of Finance 1906–11; Prime Minister in 1917	Sweden		
639	5 June 1920		Johannes Hellner	Foreign Minister	Sweden		
640	31 December 1920		Johan Ramstedt	Prime Minister in 1905	Sweden		
641	31 December 1920		Hjalmar Westring	President of Svea hovrätt	Sweden		
643	6 June 1921		Gottfrid Billing	Bishop of Lund, High Court Priester	Sweden		
652	6 June 1926		Ernst Trygger	University Chancellor	Sweden		
653	6 June 1926		Erik Marks von Würtemberg	Hovrätt President	Sweden		
654	6 June 1926		Nathan Söderblom	Archbishop of Uppsala	Sweden		
661	10 December 1927		Lars Tingsten	General	Sweden		
662	16 June 1928		Magnus Per Brahe	Count; Grand Chamberlain	Sweden	Redlig and ståndaktig	
663	16 June 1928		Carl Hederstierna	Governor of Stockholm	Sweden		
665	16 June 1928		Carl Ehrensvärd	Amiral	Sweden		
669	6 June 1931		Axel Vennersten	Speaker	Sweden		
670	6 June 1931		Herman Wrangel	Foreign Minister	Sweden		
671	17 November 1931		Marcus Wallenberg Sr.	Bankdirektör	Sweden	Esse non videri	
673	6 June 1932		Fredrik Ramel	Foreign Minister	Sweden		
682	1 February 1935		Oscar von Sydow	Prime Minister in 1921; Marshal of the Realm 1934–36	Sweden		
685	6 June 1936		Birger Ekeberg	President of Svea hovrätt 1931–46; Marshal of the Realm 1946–59	Sweden		
692	16 June 1938		Erling Eidem	Archbishop of Uppsala 1931–50	Sweden	Quasi morientes et ecce uiuimus	
695	6 June 1940		Johan Nilsson i Skottlandshus	Speaker of First Chamber 1937–55	Sweden		
696	6 June 1942		Christian Günther	Foreign Minister	Sweden		
697	6 June 1942		Olof Thörnell	General; Supreme Commander 1939–44	Sweden	Esse non videri	
703	30 September 1949		Axel Pehrsson-Bramstorp	Prime Minister in 1936	Sweden		
704	30 September 1949		Torsten Nothin	Governor of Stockholm	Sweden		
706	15 November 1949		Nils Quensel	President of the Court of Appeal	Sweden		

==== Gustaf VI Adolf of Sweden (1950–73) ====
Nr	Date	Image	Name	Title	Country	Motto	Notes
Gustaf VI Adolf (1950–73)
709	31 March 1951		Helge Jung	General; Supreme Commander 1944–51	Sweden	Humanitas Virtus Jus	
723	6 June 1953		August Sävström	Speaker	Sweden	För medborgerlig frihet	
729	6 June 1955		Harry Guldberg	President of Svea hovrätt 1950–57	Sweden	Sanning söka, rätten värna	
732	23 November 1956		Yngve Brilioth	Archbishop of Uppsala	Sweden		
736	6 June 1958		Arthur Natanael Thomson	University Chancellor	Sweden		
737	6 June 1958		Bo Hammarskjöld	Governor of Södermanland County 1935–58	Sweden		
738	28 November 1959		Nils Vult von Steyern	Justice of the Supreme Court of Sweden 1930–46; Marshal of the Realm	Sweden		
750	6 June 1961		Johan Hagander	Justice of the Supreme Court of Sweden 1943–47; Chairman of the Labor court 1947–49; Governor of Stockholm 1949–63	Sweden		
752	10 November 1962		Gustaf Sundelin	Member of First Chamber 1943–64; Speaker of First Chamber 1959–64	Sweden	Frihet under ansvar	
756	21 November 1963		Nils Swedlund	General of Swedish Army; Supreme Commander 1951–61	Sweden	Si vis pacem para bellum	
757	6 June 1964		Gunnar Hultgren	Bishop of Diocese of Visby 1947–50; Bishop of Diocese of Härnösand 1950–58; Archbishop of Uppsala 1958–67	Sweden	Charitas aedificat	
760	5 June 1965		Thorwald Bergquist	Minister of Justice 1936; Consultative Cabinet of Sweden member 1939–43; Governor of Kronoberg County 1946–64	Sweden	Mödan min glädje	
764	6 June 1968		Erik Boheman	Ambassador of Sweden in USA 1948–58; Member of First Chamber 1959–70; Speaker of First Chamber 1965–70	Sweden	Semper vigilans	
765	6 June 1968		Fridolf Thapper	Member of the Second Chamber 1941–68; Speaker of the Second Chamber 1960–68	Sweden	Firmitate et temperantia	
768	16 November 1970		Torsten Rapp	General in Air Force; Supreme Commander 1961–70	Sweden	Vänlig fasthet	
772	18 November 1971		Allan Nordenstam	Governor of Stockholm	Sweden	Rättvisa, människokärlek	
773	6 June 1972		Sture Petrén	Hovrätt President	Sweden	Cedant arma togae	
774	11 November 1972		Stig H:son Ericson	Admiral; Marshal of the Realm	Sweden	Ante mare undæ	

==== Carl XVI Gustaf of Sweden (1973–) ====
Nr	Date	Image	Name	Title	Country	Motto	Notes
Carl XVI Gustaf (1973–)
777	3 December 1974		Marcus Wallenberg Jr.	Bank Director, CEO	Sweden	Creando proceditur	
778	3 December 1974		Sten Rudholm	Justice Chancellor; Hovrätt President; Marshal of the Realm	Sweden	Vis et verba	

The Royal Order of the Seraphim was revised in 1975. Since then, the order is only open to foreign heads of state and members of royal families.

== Europe ==
=== Austria ===
Nr	Date	Image	Name	Title	Country	Motto	Notes
Karl XIII (1809–18)
191	12 April 1814		Klemens von Metternich	Prince; Chancellor of the Court and State of Austria	Austrian Empire		
Karl XIV Johan (1818–44)
252	14 April 1835		Ferdinand I	Emperor of Austria 1835–48	Austrian Empire	Recta tueri	
Oscar I (1844–59)
311	9 July 1850		Franz Joseph	Emperor of Austria 1848–1916; King of Hungary 1867–1916	Austrian Empire	Viribus unitis	
312	9 July 1850		Franz Karl	Archduke of Austria; Prince of Hungary since 1867	Austrian Empire		
Karl XV (1859–72)
400	7 January 1870		Karl Ludwig	Archduke of Austria; Prince of Hungary	Austria-Hungary		
Oscar II (1872–1907)
	12 May 1873		Richard Metternich-Winneburg	Prince	Austria-Hungary		
	7 May 1874		Gyula Andrássy	Count; Austro-Hungarian Foreign Minister	Austria-Hungary		
447	15 April 1879		Rudolf	Crown Prince of Austria-Hungary 1858–89	Austria-Hungary		
475	19 April 1885		Ludwig Viktor	Archduke of Austria; Prince of Hungary	Austria-Hungary		
476	20 April 1885		Albrecht	Archduke of Austria; Duke of Teschen	Austria-Hungary		
477	20 April 1885		Gusztáv Zsigmond Kálnoky von Köröspatak	Count; Austro-Hungarian Foreign Minister	Austria-Hungary		
	20 April 1885		Prince Konstantin of Hohenlohe-Waldenburg-Schillingsfürst	Obersthofmeister	Austria-Hungary		
	19 September 1890		Franz Ferdinand	Archduke of Austria	Austria-Hungary		
501	27 October 1890		Charles Stephen	Archduke of Austria; Prince of Hungary	Austria-Hungary		
526	18 September 1897		Eugen	Prince & Archduke of Austria; Prince of Hungary	Austria-Hungary		
	25 February 1904		Rudolf	Prince of Liechtenstein	Austria-Hungary		
Gustaf V (1907–50)
572	18 December 1907		Friedrich	Archduke of Austria; Duke of Teschen	Austria-Hungary		
591	5 December 1908		Rainer	Archduke of Austria	Austria-Hungary		
592	5 December 1908		Alois Lexa von Aehrenthal	Austro-Hungarian Foreign Minister	Austria-Hungary		
593	5 December 1908		Alfred, 2nd Prince of Montenuovo	Austro-Hungarian Grand-Marshal of the Court	Austria-Hungary		
Gustaf VI Adolf (1950–73)
743	5 April 1960		Adolf Schärf	President of Austria; 1957–65	Austria		+
Carl XVI Gustaf (1973–)
781	6 May 1976		Rudolf Kirchschläger	President of Austria	Austria		
823	15 September 1997		Thomas Klestil	President of Austria; 1992–2004	Austria		
851	20 November 2007		Heinz Fischer	President of Austria; 2004–2016	Austria		

=== Belgium ===
Nr	Date	Image	Name	Title	Country	Motto	Notes
Oscar I (1844–59)
304	30 October 1849		Leopold I	King of the Belgians 1831–65; Prince of Saxe-Coburg and Gotha	Belgium; Saxe-Coburg-Gotha	L'Union fait la Force	
315	17 May 1852		Leopold II	Duke of Brabant 1852–65; King of the Belgians 1865–1909; Ruler of the Free State of Congo	Belgium	L'Union fait la Force	
330	17 May 1856		Philippe	Prince of Belgium, Count of Flanders	Belgium	L'Union fait la Force	
Gustaf V (1907–50)
600	12 March 1910		Albert I	King of the Belgians 1909–34	Belgium	L'Union fait la Force	
655	21 September 1926		Leopold III	Prince of Belgium; Duke of Brabant 1909–34; King of the Belgians 1934–51	Belgium	L'Union fait la Force	
658	2 November 1926		Charles	Prince of Belgium, Count of Flanders; Regent of Belgium 1944–50	Belgium	L'Union fait la Force	
Gustaf VI Adolf (1950–73)
710	17 July 1951		Baudouin I	King of the Belgians; 1951–93	Belgium	L'Union fait la Force	
762	31 March 1966		Albert II	King of the Belgians; 1993–2013	Belgium	L'Union fait la Force	
Carl XVI Gustaf (1973–)
798	12 September 1983		Josephine Charlotte	Grand-Duchess of Luxembourg (consort); Princess of Belgium	Luxembourg; Belgium	L'Union fait la Force	
814	18 March 1994		Paola	Queen of the Belgians (consort)	Belgium	L'Union fait la Force	
	May 2001		Philippe	Prince of Belgium, Duke of Brabant; King of the Belgians since 2013	Belgium	L'Union fait la Force	

=== Bulgaria ===
Nr	Date	Image	Name	Title	Country	Motto	Notes
Gustaf V (1907–50)
	28 June 1937		Ferdinand I	Prince of Bulgaria 1887–1908; Tsar of Bulgaria 1908–18; Prince of Saxe-Coburg and Gotha	Kingdom of Bulgaria; Saxe-Coburg-Gotha		

=== Denmark ===
Nr	Date	Image	Name	Title	Country	Motto	Notes
Adolf Fredrik (1751–71)
42	1752		Frederick V	King of Denmark 1746–66; Father of Princess Sophia Magdalena who were engaged in 1751 with future Gustav III of Sweden (Adolf Fredrik's son)	Denmark	Pr deo et populo	
73	1766		Christian VII	King of Denmark 1766–1808	Denmark	Gloria ex amore patriæ	
Gustav III (1771–92)
	3 July 1786		Frederick VI	King of Denmark 1808–39	Denmark	Gud og den retfærdige Sag	
Karl XIV Johan (1818–44)
	28 January 1836		Christian VIII	King of Norway 1814; King of Denmark 1839–48	Denmark	Gud og Fædrelandet	
275	14 June 1841		Frederick VII	Crown Prince of Denmark 1839–48; King of Denmark 1848–63	Denmark	Folkets kærlighed, min styrke	
Oscar I (1844–59)
293	16 July 1846		Ferdinand	Crown Prince of Denmark	Denmark		Frederick V's grandson & Frederick VII's uncle
298	8 June 1848		Christian IX	Prince of Schleswig-Holstein-Sonderburg-Glücksburg; Prince of Denmark since 1853; King of Denmark 1863–1906	Denmark	Med Gud for Ære og Ret	
Karl XV (1859–72)
371	7 August 1862		Frederik VIII	Crown Prince of Denmark; King of Denmark	Denmark	Herren er min hjælper	Christian IX's son
	27 July 1869		Johann	Prince of Schleswig-Holstein-Sonderburg-Glücksburg	Denmark		Christian IX's brother
Oscar II (1872–1907)
423	27 May 1875		Waldemar	Prince of Denmark	Denmark		Christian IX's son, Frederik VIII's brother and Aage, Axel & Viggo's father
494	15 November 1888		Christian X	Prince, then King of Denmark	Denmark	Min Gud, mit land, min ære	Frederik VIII's son
	27 August 1897		Harald	Prince of Denmark	Denmark	Gud og kongen	Frederik VIII's son & Christian X's brother
568	11 June 1906		Gustav	Prince of Denmark	Denmark		Frederik VIII's son & Christian X's brother
Gustaf V (1907–50)
620	2 June 1913		Aage	Prince of Denmark 1887–1914; Prince and Count of Rosenborg 1914–40	Denmark		Christian IX's grandson, Axel & Viggo's brother
628	11 September 1917		Frederik IX	Crown Prince of Denmark 1912–47; King of Denmark 1947–72	Denmark	Med Gud for Danmark	King Christian X's son
633	23 March 1919		Axel	Prince of Denmark	Denmark		Christian IX's grandson, Aage & Viggo's brother
656	26 September 1926		Knud	Heir Apparent 1947–53; Prince of Denmark	Denmark		King Christian X's son and Frederik IX's brother
	Before 1948		Alexandrine	Duchess of Mecklenburg-Schwerin; Crown Princess of Denmark 1906–12; Queen of Denmark 1912–47; Dowager Queen 1947–1952	Denmark		Christian X of Denmark's wife and Frederik IX's mother
	Before 1948		Alexandrine	Duchess of Mecklenburg-Schwerin; Crown Princess of Denmark 1906–12; Queen of Denmark 1912–47; Dowager Queen 1947–1952	Mecklenburg-Schwerin		Christian X of Denmark's wife and Frederik IX's mother
Gustaf VI Adolf (1950–73)
718	22 March 1952		Ingeborg	Princess of Denmark (born); Princess of Sweden, duchess of Västergötland	Sweden		Christian X's sister and Frederik IX & Knud's aunt
718	22 March 1952		Ingeborg	Princess of Denmark (born); Princess of Sweden, duchess of Västergötland	Denmark		Christian X's sister and Frederik IX & Knud's aunt
719	24 March 1952		Viggo	Prince of Denmark 1893–1923; Prince and Count of Rosenborg 1923–70	Denmark		Christian IX's grandson, Axel & Aage's brother
735	10 April 1958		Margrethe II	Princess of Denmark (Heiress 1953–72); Queen of Denmark; 1972–2024; Former Queen since 2024	Denmark	Guds hjælp, Folkets kærlighed, Danmarks styrke	Frederik IX of Denmark's daughter
746	21 May 1960		Ingrid	Princess of Sweden; Crown Princess of Denmark 1935–47; Queen of Denmark 1947–72; Dowager Queen 1972–2000	Denmark; Sweden		Frederik IX of Denmark's wife and Margrethe II's mother
761	8 December 1965		Margaretha	Princess of Sweden (born); Princess of Denmark (marriage)	Denmark; Sweden		Prince Axel of Denmark's wife
775	21 December 1972		Henrik	Prince Consort of Denmark	Denmark; France		Last Knight by King Gustaf VI Adolf
Carl XVI Gustaf (1973–)
809	2 June 1993		Frederik	Crown Prince of Denmark; 1972–2024; King of Denmark since 2024	Denmark	Forbundne, forpligtet, for Kongeriget Danmark	
890	6 May 2024		Mary	Queen consort of Denmark; Since 2024	Denmark		

=== Estonia ===
Nr	Date	Image	Name	Title	Country	Motto	Notes
Carl XVI Gustaf (1973–)
816	6 September 1995		Lennart Meri	President of Estonia; 1992–2001	Estonia		
859	18 January 2011		Toomas Hendrik Ilves	President of Estonia; 2006–2016	Estonia		
887	2 May 2023		Alar Karis	President of Estonia; 2021–	Estonia		

=== Finland ===
Nr	Date	Image	Name	Title	Country	Motto	Notes
Gustaf V (1907–50)
632	12 February 1919		Carl Gustaf Emil Mannerheim	Baron; Regent and Field Marshal; President of Finland 1944–46	Finland		
651	19 June 1925		Lauri Kristian Relander	President of Finland; 1925–31	Finland	Patriae servio	
676	3 December 1932		Pehr Evind Svinhufvud	Statsminister of Finland 1930–31; President of Finland; 1931–37	Finland		
691	15 June 1938		Kyösti Kallio	President of Finland; 1937–40	Finland		
701	10 June 1947		Juho Kusti Paasikivi	President of Finland; 1946–56	Finland	Isänmaan puolesta	
Gustaf VI Adolf (1950–73)
731	2 October 1956		Urho Kekkonen	President of Finland; 1956–81	Finland	Sitä kuusta kuuleminen	*
Carl XVI Gustaf (1973–)
796	16 April 1982		Mauno Koivisto	President of Finland; 1982–94	Finland	Valtakunnan parhaaksi	* Got the chain on 9 October 1983
813	12 April 1994		Martti Ahtisaari	President of Finland; 1994–2000	Finland	Se pystyy ken uskaltaa	* Got the chain on 23 August 1996
830	1 March 2000		Tarja Halonen	President of Finland; 2000–12	Finland	Yhteisen kansan puolesta	* With chain
862	17 April 2012		Sauli Niinistö	President of Finland; 2012–24	Finland	Juurista Voimaa	Got the chain on 3 March 2015
889	23 April 2024		Alexander Stubb	President of Finland; 2024–	Finland		

=== France ===
Nr	Date	Image	Name	Title	Country	Motto	Notes
Karl XIII (1809–18)
165	3 February 1810		Napoleon I	Emperor of the French (1804–14 & 1815); King of Italy 1805–14	France		
168	30 March 1810		Honoré Charles Reille	Count; Marshal of France	France		
172	3 November 1810		Jérôme Bonaparte	Prince of France since 1804; King of Westphalia 1807–13; Marshal of France since 1850	France		
173	4 November 1810		Joseph Bonaparte	Prince of France since 1804; King of Naples 1806–08; King of Spain 1808–13	Spain; France		
Oscar I (1844–59)
325	10 October 1855		Napoleon III	Emperor of the French	France		
326	17 November 1855		François Certain Canrobert	Marshal of France	France		
327	20 December 1855		Alexandre Colonna-Walewski	French Statesman	France		
331	14 June 1856		Louis Napoléon Bonaparte	Prince Imperial; Prince Napoleon of France	France		
332	12 September 1856		Napoléon Joseph Bonaparte	Prince Napoleon of France	France		
Karl XV (1859–72)
363	26 August 1861		Patrice de MacMahon	Duke of Magenta; Marshal of France; President of France (1873–79)	France		
370	23 July 1862		Jacques Louis Randon	Marshal of France	France		
383	27 March 1865		Édouard Drouyn de Lhuys	French Minister of Foreign affairs	France		
389	3 September 1867		Adolphe Niel	Marshal of France; French Minister of Defence	France		
390	3 September 1867		Lionel de Moustier	French Minister of Foreign affairs	France		
391	3 September 1867		Rollin	French Divisional General	France		
Oscar II (1872–1907)
411	12 May 1873		François Claude du Barail	French general	France		
439	31 October 1877		Louis Decazes	Duke of Decazes & Glücksbierg; French Minister of Foreign affairs 1873–77	France		
463	1 June 1882		Jules Grévy	President of France (List); 1879–87	France		
539	17 April 1899		Émile Loubet	President of France (List ) 1899–1906	France	Virtute et labore	
567	24 April 1906		Armand Fallières	President of France (List); 1906–13	France		
Gustaf V (1907–50)
587	26 July 1908		Stéphen Pichon	French Minister of Foreign affairs	France		
619	16 April 1913		Raymond Poincaré	President of France (List ) 1913–20	France		
642	18 March 1921		Alexandre Millerand	President of France (List); 1920–24	France		
660	1 August 1927		Gaston Doumergue	President of France (List); 1924–31	France		
677	10 April 1933		Albert Lebrun	President of France (List); 1932–40	France		
Gustaf VI Adolf (1950–73)
753	8 May 1963		Charles de Gaulle	Prime Minister of France; 1944–46 & 1958–59; President of France (List ) 1959–69	France	France libre	
Carl XVI Gustaf (1973–)
791	6 June 1980		Valéry Giscard d'Estaing	President of France (List ) 1974–81	France		
801	11 May 1984		François Mitterrand	President of France (List ) 1981–95	France		
829	10 April 2000		Jacques Chirac	President of France (List ) 1995–2007	France		
867	2 December 2014		François Hollande	President of France (List ) 2012–2017	France		
888	30 January 2024		Emmanuel Macron (born 1977)	President of France (2017–)	France		

=== Germany ===
==== Prussia – German Empire ====
Nr	Date	Image	Name	Title	Country	Motto	Notes
Adolf Fredrik (1751–71)
81	25 August 1770		Henry (1726–1802)	Prince of Prussia; Diplomat	Holy Roman Empire; Prussia		
Gustav III (1771–92)
87	28 April 1772		Frederick William II	Prince of Prussia & Heir 1758–86; King of Prussia 1786–97	Holy Roman Empire; Prussia		
Gustav IV Adolf (1792–1809)
137	23 December 1797		Frederick William III	King of Prussia 1797–1840	Holy Roman Empire; Prussia		
Karl XIII (1809–18)
	29 August 1811		Frederick William IV	King of Prussia 1840–61	Prussia		
Oscar I (1844–59)
287	2 May 1844		Ernst von Pfuel	General of infantry Diplomate	Prussia		
	8 January 1847		Wilhelm I	Prince of Prussia; King of Prussia 1861–1888; German Emperor 1871–1888	German Empire; Prussia		
Karl XV (1859–72)
344	11 August 1859		Friedrich von Wrangel	Prussian Field Marshal	Prussia		
	8 January 1861		Frederick III	Prince of Prussia; Prussian Crown Prince until 1888; German Emperor and King of Prussia 1888	German Empire; Prussia		
Oscar II (1872–1907)
407	22 March 1873		Charles	Prince of Prussia	German Empire; Prussia		
	12 May 1873		Leonhard von Blumenthal	Prussian General of Infantry	Prussia		
421	19 July 1874		Friedrich Karl	Prince of Prussia	Prussia		
425	31 May 1875		Otto von Bismarck	Prussian Minister-President 1862–88; Reich Chancellor 1871–88	German Empire; Prussia	In trinitate robur	
441	25 April 1878		Wilhelm II	Prince of Prussia; Prussian Crown Prince until 1888; German Emperor and King of Prussia 1888–1918	German Empire; Prussia		
455	10 August 1881		Helmuth von Moltke	General Field Marshal; German General Commander 1871–88	German Empire; Prussia	Erst wägen dann wagen	
468	25 November 1882		Karl Friedrich von der Goltz	Prussian Cavalry General; Diplomat	German Empire; Prussia		
478	20 April 1885		Chlodwig, Prince of Hohenlohe-Schillingsfürst	Reich Chancellor	German Empire		
485	17 October 1887		Henry	Prince of Prussia	German Empire; Prussia		younger brother of Wilhelm II
492	27 July 1888		Wilhelm	Crown Prince of Prussia	German Empire; Prussia		elder son of Wilhelm II
493	31 August 1888		Alexander von Pape	Colonel General	German Empire; Prussia	Tout pour les miens	
514	3 September 1893		Friedrich Leopold	Prince of Prussia	German Empire; Prussia		
556	1 December 1904		Eitel Friedrich	Prince of Prussia	German Empire; Prussia		2nd son of Wilhelm II
561	4 August 1905		Hans von Koester	Grand admiral	German Empire	Durch Zucht zur Frucht	
565	13 February 1906		Oskar	Prince of Prussia	German Empire; Prussia		5th son of Wilhelm II
Gustaf V (1907–50)
583	6 May 1908		Bernhard von Bülow	Reich Chancellor	German Empire	Poscimur	
584	6 June 1908		August zu Eulenburg	Prussian minister	Prussia		
588	6 August 1908		Hans von Plessen	Prussian Colonel General	German Empire; Prussia		
599	10 July 1909		Adalbert	Prince of Prussia	German Empire; Prussia		3rd son of Wilhelm II
607	29 June 1911		August Wilhelm	Prince of Prussia	German Empire; Prussia		4th son of Wilhelm II
609	19 August 1911		Maximilian Egon	Prince of Fürstenberg; Prussian Colonel Marshal	German Empire		

==== Components of the Empire of Germany ====
Nr	Date	Image	Name	Title	Country	Motto	Notes
Adolf Fredrik (1751–71)
45	26 April 1753		Adolphus Frederick IV	Grand-Duke of Mecklenburg-Strelitz, 1752–94	Mecklenburg-Strelitz		
47	29 April 1754		Heinrich von Bünau	Count; Historian; Prime Minister of Sachsen-Weimar 1751–59	Saxony		
Gustav III (1771–92)
Gustav IV Adolf (1792–1809)
133	6 October 1797		Charles Frederick (1728–1811)	Margrave of Baden 1738–1803; Elector of Baden 1803–06; Grand-Duke of Baden 1806–11	(Grand Duchy of Baden) Margr. Baden (Grand Duchy of Baden) Elect. Baden; Gr. D. Baden		Frederica's gd-father and Gustav IV's gd-father-in-law
134	8 October 1797		Charles Louis (1755–1801)	Crown Prince of Baden	(Grand Duchy of Baden) Margr. Baden		Frederica's father and Gustav IV's father-in-law
Karl XIII (1809–18)
205	10 January 1817		Georg	Grand-Duke of Mecklenburg-Strelitz	Mecklenburg-Strelitz		
Karl XIV Johan (1818–44)
	14 March 1824		Auguste of Leuchtenberg	Duke of Leuchtenberg	Kingdom of Bavaria		
	12 August 1835		Maximilian of Leuchtenberg	Duke of Leuchtenberg	Kingdom of Bavaria		
271	31 December 1838		Bernhard II	Duke of Sachsen-Meiningen	Saxe-Meiningen		
286	21 June 1843		Constantine	Prince of Hohenzollern-Hechingen	(Hohenzollern-Sigmaringen) Hohenzollern-Hechingen		
Oscar I (1844–59)
289	28 September 1844		Ludwig I	King of Bavaria 1825–48	Kingdom of Bavaria		
	17 December 1846		Maximilian II	King of Bavaria 1848–64	Kingdom of Bavaria		
	16 July 1852		Karl Theodor	Prince of Bavaria	Kingdom of Bavaria		
334	10 October 1856		Adolphe	HH Duke of Nassau later Grand Duke of Luxembourg	Luxembourg; Nassau		Brother of Queen Sofia
Karl XV (1859–72)
359	19 October 1860		Fredrik Wilhelm	Grand Duke of Mecklenburg-Strelitz	Mecklenburg-Strelitz		
375	24 February 1864		Charles Anthony	HH Prince of Hohenzollern-Sigmaringen	Hohenzollern-Sigmaringen		
376	24 February 1864		Ernst I	Duke of Saxe-Altenburg	Saxony		
377	9 April 1864		Ludwig II	King of Bavaria	Kingdom of Bavaria		
380	14 May 1864		Leopold IV	Duke of Anhalt-Dessau	Anhalt		
399	2 November 1869		Frederick William	Landgrave of Hessen-Kassel	Hessen		
Oscar II (1872–1907)
403	8 October 1872		George Victor	Prince of Waldeck-Pyrmont 1845–93	German Empire		
406	13 March 1873		Frederick I	Duke of Anhalt	German Empire; Anhalt		
424	29 May 1875		August	Prince of Württemberg	Württemberg		
426	2 June 1875		Albert I	King of Saxony 1873–1902	German Empire; Kingdom of Saxony	providentiae memor	
427	9 June 1875		Charles Alexander	Grand-Duke of Saxe-Weimar-Eisenach 1853–1901	German Empire; Saxe-Weimar-Eisenach		
436	20 June 1876		Nicholas of Leuchtenberg	Duke of Leuchtenberg	German Empire		
	20 June 1876		George of Leuchtenberg	Duke of Leuchtenberg	German Empire		
437	15 April 1877		Frederick I	Grand Duke of Baden 1856–1907	German Empire; Baden		
442	13 May 1878		Charles Augustus	Hereditary Grand-Duke of Saxe-Weimar-Eisenach	German Empire; Saxe-Weimar-Eisenach		
	21 June 1879		Peter	Duke of Oldenburg	German Empire		
451	17 October 1879		Charles I	King of Württemberg 1864–91	German Empire; Württemberg		
454	9 July 1881		Nikolaus Wilhelm	Prince of Nassau-Weilburg	German Empire		Queen Sofia of Sweden's brother
456	20 September 1881		Frederick II	Grand Duke of Baden 1907–18	German Empire; Baden		Queen Victoria of Sweden's brother
458	21 September 1881		Ludvig IV	Grand Duke of Hessen-Darmstadt 1877–92	German Empire; Grand Duchy of Hesse		
	12 July 1895		Ludwig III	King of Bavaria	German Empire; Kingdom of Bavaria		
	22 April 1896		Frederick Francis III	Grand Duke of Mecklenburg-Schwerin	Mecklenburg-Schwerin		
529	18 September 1896		William	Prince of Wied	German Empire		
529	18 September 1897		Rupprecht	Crown Prince of Bavaria	German Empire; Kingdom of Bavaria		
532	18 September 1897		Friedrich	Prince of Waldeck and Pyrmont	German Empire		
	18 September 1897		William Ernest	Grand-Duke of Saxe-Weimar-Eisenach 1901–18	German Empire; Saxe-Weimar-Eisenach		
	18 September 1897		John Albert	Duke of Mecklenburg-Schwerin	Mecklenburg-Schwerin		
549	24 April 1902		Max	Prince of Baden; German Chancellor in 1918	German Empire; Baden		
Gustaf V (1907–50)
	18 December 1907		Ferdinand	Prince of Bavaria	German Empire; Kingdom of Bavaria		
590	26 November 1908		Carl Ludwig Wilhelm Arthur von Brauer	State Minister of Baden	German Empire; Baden		
601	12 March 1910		Frederick Augustus III	King of Saxony 1904–18	German Empire; Kingdom of Saxony		
	31 May 1910		Luitpold	Prince Regent of Bavaria	German Empire; Kingdom of Bavaria		
	29 August 1911		Maximilian Egon II	Prince of Fürstenberg	German Empire		
	9 July 1913		William II	King of Württemberg	German Empire; Württemberg		
617	12 July 1913		Frederick Augustus II	Grand Duke of Oldenburg	German Empire		
647	9 November 1922		Adolf Friedrich	Duke of Mecklenburg-Schwerin	Weimar Republic; Mecklenburg-Schwerin		
666	16 June 1928		Berthold	Prince and Margrave of Baden; Head of House of Baden 1929–63	Weimar Republic; Baden		
	21 May 1935		Frederick Francis IV	Grand Duke of Mecklenburg-Schwerin	Weimar Republic; Mecklenburg-Schwerin		
	22 October 1936		Frederick	Prince of Hohenzollern-Sigmaringen	Weimar Republic		

==== Modern Germany ====
Nr	Date	Image	Name	Title	Country	Motto	Notes
Gustaf VI Adolf (1950–73)
748	23 May 1961		Friedrich Wilhelm	Prince of Hohenzollern-Sigmaringen; Head of the House of Hohenzollern-Sigmaringen 1965-2010	Germany; Hohenzollern-Sigmaringen	Nihil sine deo	
749	23 May 1961		Johann Georg	Prince of Hohenzollern-Sigmaringen	Germany; Hohenzollern-Sigmaringen	Nihil sine deo	Husband of Princess Birgitta
Carl XVI Gustaf (1973–)
767	25 May 1970		Gustav Heinemann	President of Germany; 1969–74	Germany		
785	6 March 1979		Walter Scheel	President of Germany; 1974–79	Germany		
804	16 May 1988		Richard von Weizsäcker	President of Germany; 1984–94	Germany	us/img178/4985/weizsckerwc4.jpg Arms	
840	8 May 2003		Johannes Rau	President of Germany; 1999–2004	Germany		
876	5 October 2016		Joachim Gauck	President of Germany; 2012–2017	Germany		
884	7 September 2021		Frank-Walter Steinmeier	President of Germany; 2017–	Germany		

=== Greece ===
Nr	Date	Image	Name	Title	Country	Motto	Notes
Karl XIV Johan (1818–44)
253	11 July 1835		Otto of Greece	King of Greece 1832–62	Greece		
Karl XV (1859–72)
392	17 April 1868		George I	King of Greece	Greece		
Oscar II (1872–1907)
481	23 September 1886		Constantine I	Crown Prince, later King of Greece	Greece		
Gustaf V (1907–50)
635	8 May 1919		George	Prince of Greece & Denmark	Greece		
	20 May 1919		George II	King of Greece	Greece		
Gustaf VI Adolf (1950–73)
725	23 June 1954		Philip	Born Prince of Greece & Denmark; Duke of Edinburgh 1947–2001; Prince of United Kingdom 1957–2021	United Kingdom	God Is My Help	
725	23 June 1954		Philip	Born Prince of Greece & Denmark; Duke of Edinburgh 1947–2001; Prince of United Kingdom 1957–2021	Greece	God Is My Help	
758	14 September 1964		Constantine II	King of Greece; 1964–73	Greece		
Carl XVI Gustaf (1973–)
788	5 October 1979		Sophia	Queen of Spain (consort); Princess of Greece & Denmark	Spain; Greece		
855	20 May 2008		Karolos Papoulias	President of Greece; 2005–2015	Greece		

=== Hungary ===
Nr	Date	Image	Name	Title	Country	Motto	Notes
Gustaf V (1907–50)
694	27 January 1940		Miklós Horthy	Head of State of Hungary	Hungary		
Carl XVI Gustaf (1973–)
820	9 September 1996		Árpád Göncz	President of Hungary	Hungary		

=== Iceland ===
Nr	Date	Image	Name	Title	Country	Motto	Notes
Gustaf VI Adolf (1950–73)
771	22 April 1971		Kristján Eldjárn	President of Iceland; 1968–80	Iceland		
Carl XVI Gustaf (1973–)
795	8 October 1981		Vigdís Finnbogadóttir	President of Iceland; 1980–96	Iceland		Got the chain 11 June 1987.
826	7 September 2003		Ólafur Ragnar Grímsson	President of Iceland; 1996– 2016	Iceland	Vires Islandiae	
879	18 January 2018		Guðni Th. Jóhannesson	President of Iceland; 2016–2024	Iceland		
891	6 May 2025		Halla Tómasdóttir	President of Iceland; 2024–	Iceland		

=== Italy ===
Nr	Date	Image	Name	Title	Country	Motto	Notes
Karl XV (1859–72)
366	30 August 1861		Victor Emmanuel II	King of Sardinia 1849–61; King of Italy 1861–78	Kingdom of Italy; Kingdom of Sardinia		
369	14 March 1862		Umberto I	Crown Prince of Italy; King of Italy 1878–1900	Kingdom of Italy		Victor Emmanuel II's son
373	2 August 1863		Amadeo I	Prince of Savoy; Duke of Aosta later King of Spain	Spain; Kingdom of Italy		Victor Emmanuel II's son
Oscar II (1872–1907)
412	12 May 1873		Luigi Federico Menabrea	Count; Marquis; Prime Minister of Italy 1867–69; Diplomate	Kingdom of Italy	Virtus in ardus	
489	15 April 1888		Victor Emmanuel III	Crown Prince of Italy; King of Italy 1900–46	Kingdom of Italy		Umberto I's son
527	18 September 1897		Emanuel Filiberto	Prince of Savoy; Duke of Aosta; Prince of Asturias	Kingdom of Italy	Saper osare voler vincere	Amadeo I's son
543	11 September 1900		Luigi Amedeo	Prince of Savoy; Duke of the Abruzzi	Kingdom of Italy		
Gustaf V (1907–50)
606	28 April 1911		Giovanni Giolitti	Prime Minister of Italy (1892–93, 1903–05, 1906–09, 1911–14 and 1920–21)	Kingdom of Italy		
645	7 September 1922		Umberto II	Prince of Piedmont 1904–46; King of Italy in 1946	Kingdom of Italy		Victor Emmanuel III's son
667	12 April 1930		Benito Mussolini	Prime Minister of Italy 1922–43	Kingdom of Italy	No Coat of Arms	
Gustaf VI Adolf (1950–73)
763	1 June 1966		Giuseppe Saragat	President of Italy; 1964–71	Italy		
Carl XVI Gustaf (1973–)
807	25 March 1991		Francesco Cossiga	President of Italy; 1985–92	Italy	Nisi dominus custodierit civitatem frustra vigilat qui custodiat eam	
824	30 April 1998		Oscar Luigi Scalfaro	President of Italy; 1992–99	Italy		
857	13 March 2009		Giorgio Napolitano	President of Italy; 2006–2015	Italy		
881	13 November 2018		Sergio Mattarella	President of Italy; 2015–	Italy		

=== Latvia ===
Nr	Date	Image	Name	Title	Country	Motto	Notes
Carl XVI Gustaf (1973–)
817	12 October 1995		Guntis Ulmanis	President of Latvia; 1993–99	Latvia		
846	31 March 2005		Vaira Vīķe-Freiberga	President of Latvia; 1999–2007	Latvia		
867	26 March 2014		Andris Bērziņš (born 1944)	President of Latvia (2011–2015)	Latvia		

=== Lithuania ===
Nr	Date	Image	Name	Title	Country	Motto	Notes
Carl XVI Gustaf (1973–)
818	20 November 1995		Algirdas Brazauskas	President of Lithuania; 1993–1998	Lithuania		
871	7 October 2015		Dalia Grybauskaitė	President of Lithuania; 2009–2019	Lithuania		

=== Luxembourg ===
Nr	Date	Image	Name	Title	Country	Motto	Notes
Karl XIII (1809–18)
187	14 April 1813		William I	Sovereign Prince of the United Netherlands 1813–15; King of the Netherlands 1815–40; Grand Duke of Luxembourg 1815–40	Netherlands; Luxembourg	Je maintiendrai	
Oscar I (1844–59)
290	28 September 1844		William II	Prince of Orange 1815–40; King of the Netherlands 1840–49; Grand Duke of Luxembourg 1840–49	Netherlands; Luxembourg	Je maintiendrai	
302	23 May 1849		William III	Prince of Orange 1840–49; King of the Netherlands 1849–90; Grand Duke of Luxembourg 1849–90	Netherlands; Luxembourg	Je maintiendrai	
334	10 October 1856		Adolphe	HH Duke of Nassau later Grand Duke of Luxembourg	Luxembourg; Nassau		Brother of Queen Sofia
Oscar II (1872–1907)
498	19 June 1889		William IV	Grand Duke of Luxembourg 1905–12	Luxembourg		Nephew of Queen Sofia
Gustaf V (1907–50)
693	14 April 1939		Charlotte	Grand Duchess of Luxembourg 1919–64	Luxembourg		
Gustaf VI Adolf (1950–73)
711	18 July 1951		Felix	Prince of Bourbon-Parma (born); Prince of Luxembourg (marriage)	Luxembourg		
712	18 July 1951		Jean	Hereditary Grand Duke of Luxembourg 1921–64; Grand Duke of Luxembourg; 1964–2000	Luxembourg	Je maintiendrai	
Carl XVI Gustaf (1973–)
798	12 September 1983		Josephine Charlotte	Grand-Duchess of Luxembourg (consort); Princess of Belgium	Luxembourg; Belgium	L'Union fait la Force	
799	12 September 1983		Henri	Grand Duke of Luxembourg; 2000-2025	Luxembourg	Je maintiendrai	
853	15 April 2008		Maria Teresa	Grand-Duchess of Luxembourg (consort)	Luxembourg; Cuba		

=== Monaco ===
Nr	Date	Image	Name	Title	Country	Motto	Notes
Oscar II (1872–1907)
	17 June 1894		Albert I	Prince of Monaco	Monaco		
Gustaf V (1907–50)
648	9 April 1923		Louis II	Prince of Monaco	Monaco		
705	14 October 1949		Rainier III	Prince of Monaco 1949–2005	Monaco	Deo juvante	

=== Netherlands ===
Nr	Date	Image	Name	Title	Country	Motto	Notes
Karl XIII (1809–18)
187	14 April 1813		William I	Sovereign Prince of the United Netherlands 1813–15; King of the Netherlands 1815–40; Grand Duke of Luxembourg 1815–40	Netherlands; Luxembourg	Je maintiendrai	
Oscar I (1844–59)
290	28 September 1844		William II	Prince of Orange 1815–40; King of the Netherlands 1840–49; Grand Duke of Luxembourg 1840–49	Netherlands; Luxembourg	Je maintiendrai	
302	23 May 1849		William III	Prince of Orange 1840–49; King of the Netherlands 1849–90; Grand Duke of Luxembourg 1849–90	Netherlands; Luxembourg	Je maintiendrai	
305	10 February 1850		Frederick	Prince of the Netherlands	Netherlands	Je maintiendrai	Son of King Willem I Father of Queen Louise
306	23 February 1850		William	Prince of the Netherlands; Prince of Orange 1849–79	Netherlands	Je maintiendrai	Son of Willem III and elder brother of Wilhelmina
307	23 February 1850		Henry	Prince of the Netherlands	Netherlands		Brother of Willem III
Oscar II (1872–1907)
420	7 July 1874		Alexander	Prince of the Netherlands; Prince of Orange 1879–84	Netherlands	Je maintiendrai	Son of Willem III and elder brother of Wilhelmina
545	30 January 1901		Henry	Duke of Mecklenburg-Schwerin (born); Prince of the Netherlands (marriage)	Netherlands	Per aspera ad astra	Wilhelmina's husband
Gustaf V (1907–50)
646	9 September 1922		Wilhelmina	Queen of the Netherlands	Netherlands	Je maintiendrai	
698	8 April 1946		Juliana	Princess of the Netherlands 1909–48; Queen of the Netherlands 1948–80	Netherlands	Je maintiendrai	
699	8 April 1946		Bernhard	Count of Biesterfeld (born); Prince of Lippe-Biesterfeld (elevated 1916); Prince of the Netherlands (marriage)	Netherlands		Juliana's husband
Carl XVI Gustaf (1973–)
783	6 October 1976		Beatrix	Queen of the Netherlands	Netherlands	Je maintiendrai (us/img502/3816/beatrixtb5.jpg Arms)	
812	24 November 1993		Willem-Alexander	Prince of Orange 1980–2013; King of the Netherlands since 2013	Netherlands	Je maintiendrai	
886	11 October 2022		Queen Máxima of the Netherlands	Princess of the Netherlands 2002–2013; Queen of the Netherlands since 2013	Netherlands		

=== Norway ===
Nr	Date	Image	Name	Title	Country	Motto	Notes
Oscar II (1872–1907)
513	30 May 1893		Haakon VII	Prince of Denmark 1872–1905; King of Norway 1905–57	Denmark; Norway	Alt for Norge	
Gustaf V (1907–50)
657	1 November 1926		Olav V	Crown Prince of Norway 1905–57; King of Norway 1957–91	Norway	Alt for Norge	
Gustaf VI Adolf (1950–73)
734	10 April 1958		Harald V	Crown Prince of Norway 1957–91; King of Norway 1991–2026	Norway	Alt for Norge	
Carl XVI Gustaf (1973–)
776	26 December 1974		Sonja	Former Queen of Norway (consort)	Norway		1st Member by Carl XVI
810	2 June 1993		Haakon VIII	Crown Prince of Norway; 1991–2026; King of Norway since 2026	Norway	Alt for Norge	

=== Poland ===
Nr	Date	Image	Name	Title	Country	Motto	Notes
Carl XVI Gustaf (1973–)
811	16 September 1993		Lech Wałęsa	President of Poland; 1990–95	Poland	Odważnie i roztropnie	
860	4 May 2011		Bronisław Komorowski	President of Poland; 2010–15	Poland	Frangas Non Flectes	
892	10 March 2026		Karol Nawrocki	President of Poland; 2025–	Poland		

=== Portugal ===
Nr	Date	Image	Name	Title	Country	Motto	Notes
Oscar I (1844–59)
314	15 February 1852		Fernando II	Prince of Saxe-Coburg-Gotha; Prince of Portugal 1836–37; Titular King of Portugal since 1837	Portugal; Saxe-Coburg-Gotha		
Karl XV (1859–72)
367	27 November 1861		Luís I	King of Portugal	Portugal		
382	4 October 1864		Nuno José de Moura Barreto	Prime Minister of Portugal; 1st Duke of Loulé	Portugal		
Oscar II (1872–1907)
416	23 May 1873		Carlos I	Crown Pr. of Portugal; King of Portugal 1889–1908	Portugal		Luís I's son Murdered by Republicans
435	1 December 1875		António José de Ávila	Prime Minister of Portugal; Duke of Ávila and Bolama	Portugal		
	24 December 1883		Afonso, Duke of Porto	Duke of Porto	Portugal		Luís I's son
Gustaf V (1907–50)
595	27 February 1909		Manuel II	King of Portugal 1908–10	Portugal		Carlos I's younger son
Carl XVI Gustaf (1973–)
802	16 September 1986		Mário Soares	President of Portugal; 1986–96	Portugal		
854	5 May 2008		Aníbal Cavaco Silva	President of Portugal; 2006–2016	Portugal		

=== Romania ===
Nr	Date	Image	Name	Title	Country	Motto	Notes
Oscar II (1872–1907)
446	10 April 1879		Carol I	King of Romania 1881–1914	Kingdom of Romania	Nihil sine deo	
Gustaf V (1907–50)
574	18 December 1907		Ferdinand I	King of Romania	Kingdom of Romania		
Carl XVI Gustaf (1973–)
792	4 November 1980		Nicolae Ceaușescu	President of Romania; 1974–89	Romania		No Coat of Ams
839	25 March 2003		Ion Iliescu	President of Romania	Romania		
852	11 March 2008		Traian Băsescu	President of Romania; 2004–2014	Romania		

=== Russia ===
Nr	Date	Image	Name	Title	Country	Motto	Notes
Adolf Fredrik (1751–71)
65	21 November 1763		Catherine II	Tsarina of Russia 1762–96; Empress Consort of Russia 1762; Princess of Anhalt-Zerbst	Russian Empire		
Gustav IV Adolf (1792–1809)
141	16 November 1799		Alexander I	Russian Heir 1796–1801; Tsar of Russia 1801–25	Russian Empire		
	4 November 1800		Constantine Pavlovich	Grand Duke of Russia	Russian Empire		
Karl XIV Johan (1818–44)
	4 September 1812		Nicholas I	Tsar of Russia 1825–55	Russian Empire		
228	28 January 1825		Karl Robert de Nesselrode	Count and statesman Russian Foreign Minister 1816–56	Russian Empire		
233	6 March 1826		Alexander II (1818–81)	Russian Heir 1825–55; Tsar of Russia 1855–81	Russian Empire		
267	12 June 1838		Constantine Nicholaievich (1827–92)	Grand Duke of Russia	Russian Empire		Nikolaï I's son and Alexander II's brother
270	12 June 1838		Alexander Sergeyevich Menshikov	Russian general	Russian Empire		
Oscar I (1844–59)
292	20 August 1845		Alexander Ivanovich Chernyshyov	Russian general	Russian Empire		
Karl XV (1859–72)
345	16 August 1859		Feodor von Berg	Russian field marshal	Russian Empire		
	20 September 1859		Nicholas Alexandrovich	Tsarevich of Russia	Russian Empire		Alexander II's son
355	16 May 1860		Alexander Mikhailovich Gorchakov	Russian Imperial Chancellor	Russian Empire		
385	5 June 1865		Alexander III	Tsarevich of Russia later Tsar of Russia	Russian Empire		Alexander II's son
394	27 July 1869		Vladimir Alexandrovich (1847–1909)	Grand Duke of Russia	Russian Empire		Alexander II's son
Oscar II (1872–1907)
413	12 May 1873		Wilhelm von Lieven (1800–1880)	Baron, Russian General, Deputy General and Court Hunt-master	Russian Empire		
418	28 August 1873		Alexei Alexandrovich (1850–1908)	Grand Duke of Russia	Russian Empire		Alexander II's son
428	19 July 1875		Nikolaï Nikolaevich (1831–91)	Grand Duke of Russia	Russian Empire		Nikolaï I's son and Alexander II's brother
429	19 July 1875		Sergei Alexandrovich (1857–1905)	Grand Duke of Russia	Russian Empire		Alexander II's son
430	19 July 1875		Pavel Alexandrovich (1860–1919)	Grand Duke of Russia	Russian Empire		Alexander II's son
431	19 July 1875		Vladimir Dolgorukiy (1810–1891)	Prince and General	Russian Empire		
432	19 July 1875		Alexander Adlerberg (1818–1888)	Count and General	Russian Empire		
433	19 July 1875		Dmitry Milyutin	Count; General of infantry Russian Minister of War 1861–81	Russian Empire		
449	21 June 1879		Peter Georgievich	Duke of House of Oldenburg	Russian Empire		
465	27 June 1882		Eugen von Leuchtenberg	Duke of Leuchtenberg	Russian Empire		
469	19 May 1883		Nikolaï II	Grand Duke of Russia; Tsar of Russia	Russian Empire		Alexander III's son
	15 February 1892		Michael Nicholaievich	Grand Duke of Russia	Russian Empire		Nikolaï I's son and Alexander II's brother
618	12 July 1897		Boris Vladimirovich (1877 – 1943)	Grand Duke of Russia	Russian Empire		Vladimir Alex.'s son & Nikolaï II's 1st cousin
Gustaf V (1907–50)
577	12 May 1908		Michail Alexandrovich	Grand Duke of Russia	Russian Empire		Alexander III's son and Nikolaï II's brother
578	12 May 1908		Dmitri Pavlovich	Grand Duke of Russia	Russian Empire		Pavel Alex.'s son and Nikolaï II's 1st cousin
579	12 May 1908		Nikolaï Mikhailovich (1859 – 1919)	Grand Duke of Russia	Russian Empire		Alexander II's nephew
580	12 May 1908		Vladimir Frederiks	Russian Count and General	Russian Empire		
581	18 December 1908		Pyotr Stolypin	Prime Minister of Russia	Russian Empire		
582	18 December 1908		Alexander Izvolsky	Russian Foreign Minister	Russian Empire		
	27 June 1909		Alexei Nikolaevich	Tsarevich of Russia	Russian Empire		Nikolaï II's son
614	5 July 1912		Sergey Sazonov	Russian Foreign Minister	Russian Empire		
618	18 July 1912		Cyril Vladimirovich	Grand Duke of Russia; Throne Pretender 1922–38	Russian Empire		Vladimir Alex.'s son & Nikolaï II's 1st cousin

=== Serbia ===
Nr	Date	Image	Name	Title	Country	Motto	Notes
Oscar II (1872–1907)
462	8 May 1882		Milan I of Serbia (Prince Milan Obrenović IV)	King of Serbia 1882–89	Serbia	Tempus et meum jus	

=== Slovakia ===
Nr	Date	Image	Name	Title	Country	Motto	Notes
Carl XVI Gustaf (1973–)
834	21 March 2002		Rudolf Schuster	President of Slovakia	Slovakia		

=== Spain ===
Nr	Date	Image	Name	Title	Country	Motto	Notes
Karl XIII (1809–18)
173	4 November 1810		Joseph Bonaparte	Prince of France since 1804; King of Naples 1806–08; King of Spain 1808–13	Spain; France		
Oscar I (1844–59)
322	3 May 1853		Francis, Duke of Cádiz	Titular King of Spain 1846–1902	Spain		Isabella II's husband
Karl XV (1859–72)
357	12 July 1860		Leopoldo O’Donnell	1st Duke of Tetuan, Prime Minister of Spain and Marshal	Spain		
373	2 August 1863		Amadeo I	HRH. Duke of Aosta later King of Spain	Spain; Kingdom of Italy		
Oscar II (1872–1907)
438	23 October 1877		Alfonso XII	King of Spain 1874–85	Spain	Plus ultra	
491	28 May 1888		Alfonso XIII	King of Spain 1886–1931	Spain		
573	10 May 1884		Ludvig Ferdinand	Prince of Bavaria; Infant of Spain	Kingdom of Bavaria; Spain		Isabella II's son-in-law
Gustaf V (1907–50)
659	19 April 1927		Alfonso	Infant of Spain; Crown Prince of Spain 1907–31; Earl of Covadonga since 1933	Spain		Alfonso XIII's eldest son & J.C.'s uncle
Carl XVI Gustaf (1973–)
787	5 October 1979		Juan Carlos I	Former King of Spain; 1975–2014	Spain	Nec plus ultra	
788	5 October 1979		Sofía	Former Queen of Spain (consort); Princess of Greece & Denmark	Spain; Kingdom of Greece		
808	17 December 1991		Felipe	King of Spain since 2014	Spain		
885	24 November 2021		Letizia	Queen of Spain since 2014	Spain		

=== Turkey ===
==== Ottoman Empire ====
Nr	Date	Image	Name	Title	Country	Motto	Notes
Oscar II (1872–1907)
450	24 July 1879		Abdul Hamid II	Sultan of Ottoman Empire; 1876–1909	Ottoman Empire		

==== Republic of Turkey ====
Nr	Date	Image	Name	Title	Country	Motto	Notes
Carl XVI Gustaf (1973–)
864	11 March 2013		Abdullah Gül	President of Turkey; 2007–14	Turkey		

=== United Kingdom ===
Nr	Date	Image	Name	Title	Country	Motto	Notes
Oscar I (1844–59)
317	9 September 1852		George V of Hanover	King of Hanover 1851–66; Prince of United Kingdom; Duke of Cumberland	Hanover; United Kingdom	Suscipere et finire	
328	28 January 1856		Albert	Prince of Saxe-Coburg and Gotha; British Prince Consort	Saxe-Coburg-Gotha; United Kingdom	Treu und fest	
Karl XV (1859–72)
381	27 September 1864		Edward VII	Prince of United Kingdom; Prince of Saxe-Coburg and Gotha; Prince of Wales; King of the United Kingdom 1901–10; Emperor of India 1901–10	United Kingdom; Saxe-Coburg-Gotha		
Oscar II (1872–1907)
417	18 July 1873		Arthur	Prince of United Kingdom; Prince of Saxe-Coburg and Gotha 1850–1917; Duke of Connaught and Strathearn 1874–1942; Governor General of Canada 1911–16	United Kingdom; Saxe-Coburg-Gotha		
452	24 May 1881		Alfred	Duke of Saxe-Coburg and Gotha 1883–1900; Prince of United Kingdom; Duke of Edinburgh	United Kingdom; Saxe-Coburg-Gotha		
453	24 May 1881		Leopold	Prince of United Kingdom; Prince of Saxe-Coburg and Gotha; Duke of Albany	United Kingdom; Saxe-Coburg-Gotha		
474	8 January 1885		Albert Victor	Prince of United Kingdom; Prince of Saxe-Coburg and Gotha; Duke of Clarence and Avondale	United Kingdom; Saxe-Coburg-Gotha		
	18 September 1897		Christian	Prince of Schleswig-Holstein	United Kingdom; Schleswig-Holstein		
559	14 June 1905		George V	Prince of United Kingdom; Prince of Saxe-Coburg and Gotha; Prince of Wales 1901–10; King of the Un. Kingdom 1910–36; Emperor of India 1910–36	United Kingdom; Saxe-Coburg-Gotha	Dieu et mon droit	
560	14 June 1905		Arthur of Connaught	Prince of United Kingdom; Prince of Saxe-Coburg and Gotha 1883–1917	United Kingdom; Saxe-Coburg-Gotha		Brother of Crown Princess Margaret
Gustaf V (1907–50)
589	16 November 1908		John Campbell	9th Duke of Argyll	United Kingdom		
649	12 November 1923		Edward VIII	Prince of Wales 1910–36; King of the United Kingdom in 1936; Duke of Windsor 1936–72	United Kingdom		
674	1 October 1932		George	Prince of United Kingdom; Duke of Kent	United Kingdom		
675	6 June 1932		Charles Edward	Duke of Saxe-Coburg-Gotha 1900–18; Prince of United Kingdom; Duke of Albany 1884–1919	Weimar Rep. Saxe-Coburg-Gotha; United Kingdom	Fideliter et constanter	Father of Princess Sibylla
687	10 May 1937		George VI	King of the United Kingdom 1937–52; Emperor of India 1937–47	United Kingdom	Dieu et mon droit	
Gustaf VI Adolf (1950–73)
708	29 October 1950		Louise (1889–1965)	Queen of Sweden (consort)	Sweden; United Kingdom		
720	1 April 1952		Louis Mountbatten	Earl Mountbatten of Burma; Governor General of India 1947–48	United Kingdom	In honour bound (us/img267/624/mountbattenofburmaki1.jpg C. of Arms)	brother of Queen Louise
722	26 May 1953		Elizabeth II	Queen of the United Kingdom; 1952–2022; Head of the Commonwealth	United Kingdom	Dieu et mon droit (us/img509/6513/elizabethiiko6.jpg C. of Arms)	
725	23 June 1954		Philip	Born Prince of Greece & Denmark; Duke of Edinburgh 1947–2021; Prince of United Kingdom 1957–2021	United Kingdom; Greece	God Is My Help	
730	8 June 1956		Henry	Prince of United Kingdom; Duke of Gloucester; Governor General of Australia 1945–47	United Kingdom		
Carl XVI Gustaf (1973–)
779	23 May 1975		Charles III	Prince of United Kingdom; Heir of United Kingdom; 1952–2022; Prince of Wales (1958–2022); King of the United Kingdom and the other Commonwealth realms (since 2022)	United Kingdom	Ich dien	

=== Yugoslavia ===
Nr	Date	Image	Name	Title	Country	Motto	Notes
Carl XVI Gustaf (1973–)
780	11 March 1976		Josip Broz Tito	President of Yugoslavia	Yugoslavia		

== Americas ==
=== Argentina ===
Carl XVI Gustaf (1973-)
Nr	Date	Image	Name	Title	Country	Motto	Stallplate
825	26 May 1998		Carlos Menem	President of Argentina; 1989–1999	Argentina		

=== Brazil ===
Nr	Date	Image	Name	Title	Country	Motto	Notes
Oscar I (1844–59)
288	11 June 1844		Pedro II	Emperor of Brazil; 1831–89	Empire of Brazil		
Gustaf V (1907–50)
644	14 July 1922		Epitácio da Silva Pessoa	President of Brazil; 1919–22	Brazil		
Carl XVI Gustaf (1973–)
800	21 March 1984		João Figueiredo	President of Brazil; 1979–85	Brazil		
849	13 March 2009		Luiz Inácio Lula da Silva	President of Brazil (2003–2010, 2023–present)	Brazil		

=== Chile ===
Nr	Date	Image	Name	Title	Country	Motto	Stallplates
Carl XVI Gustaf (1973–)
821	15 November 1996		Eduardo Frei Ruiz-Tagle	President of Chile; 1994–2000	Chile	Por la razón o la fuerza	
875	10 May 2016		Michelle Bachelet	President of Chile; 2006–2010; 2014–2018	Chile	Incluir para crecer	

=== Mexico ===
Nr	Date	Image	Name	Title	Country	Motto	Notes
Karl XV (1859–72)
	21 April 1865		Maximilian I	Emperor of Mexico; 1864–67	Second Mexican Empire		
Carl XVI Gustaf (1973–)
790	5 May 1980		José López Portillo	President of Mexico	Mexico		
835	22 October 2002		Vicente Fox	President of Mexico; 2000–06	Mexico		

== Africa ==
=== Egypt ===
Nr	Date	Image	Name	Title	Country	Motto	Notes
Gustaf V (1907–50)
678	18 May 1933		Fuad I	King of Egypt 1922–36	Egypt		
Carl XVI Gustaf (1973–)
803	16 September 1986		Hosni Mubarak	President of Egypt	Egypt	بسم الله الرحمن الرحيم (= In the name of merciful God)	

=== Ethiopia ===
Nr	Date	Image	Name	Title	Country	Motto	Notes
Gustaf V (1907–50)
650	10 June 1924		Haile Selassie	Emperor of Ethiopia	Ethiopia		
Gustaf VI Adolf (1950–73)
726	15 November 1954		Amha Selassie	Crown Prince of Ethiopia 1930–75; Throne Pretender in exile 1975–97	Ethiopia		Haile Selassie I's older son
727	15 November 1954		Makonnen	Prince of Ethiopia; Duke of Harar	Ethiopia		Haile Selassie I's 2nd son
728	15 November 1954		Sara	Princess of Ethiopia (consort); Duchess of Harar (consort)	Ethiopia		Makonnen's widow
739	19 December 1959		Sahle Selassie	Prince of Ethiopia	Ethiopia		Haile Selassie I's youngest son
740	19 December 1959		Menen	Empress of Ethiopia (consort)	Ethiopia		Haile Selassie I's wife
741	19 December 1959		Medferiashwork	Crown Princess of Ethiopia (consort)	Ethiopia		Amha Selassie's wife
742	19 December 1959		Mahisente	Princess of Ethiopia (consort)	Ethiopia		Sahle Selassie's widow

=== Liberia ===
Nr	Date	Image	Name	Title	Country	Motto	Notes
Gustaf VI Adolf (1950–73)
751	13 September 1962		William Tubman	President of Liberia; 1944–71	Liberia		

=== South Africa ===
Nr	Date	Image	Name	Title	Country	Motto	Notes
Carl XVI Gustaf (1973–)
822	3 March 1997		Nelson Mandela	President of South Africa; 1994–99	South Africa	Ex unitate vires	

=== Tanzania ===
Nr	Date	Image	Name	Title	Country	Motto	Notes
Gustaf VI Adolf (1950–73)
755	6 September 1963		Julius Nyerere	President of Tanzania; 1962–85	Tanzania	Uhuru na umoja	

=== Tunisia ===
Nr	Date	Image	Name	Title	Country	Motto	Notes
Gustaf VI Adolf (1950–73)
754	22 May 1963		Habib Bourguiba	President of Tunisia; 1957–87	Tunisia		
Carl XVI Gustaf (1973–)
872	4 November 2015		Beji Caid Essebsi	President of Tunisia; 2014–19	Tunisia		

== Asia - Middle East ==
=== Iran ===
Nr	Date	Image	Name	Title	Country	Motto	Notes
Gustaf VI Adolf (1950–73)
744	29 April 1960		Mohammad Reza Pahlavi	Shah of Iran; 1941–79	Iran		
745	29 April 1960		Farah	Shahbanu of Iran	Iran		
769	24 August 1970		Reza Pahlavi	Crown Prince of Iran 1960–79	Iran		Current Head of the Imperial House
770	24 November 1970		Abdul Reza Pahlavi	Prince of Iran	Iran		Shahanshah's brother (d. in 2004)

=== Jordan ===
Nr	Date	Image	Name	Title	Country	Motto	Notes
Carl XVI Gustaf (1973–)
805	15 September 1989		Hussein	King of Jordan 1952–99	Jordan		
806	15 September 1989		Noor	Queen of Jordan (Consort)	Jordan		
841	7 October 2003		Abdullah II	King of Jordan since 1999	Jordan		
842	7 October 2003		Rania	Queen of Jordan (Consort)	Jordan		

=== Saudi Arabia ===
Nr	Date	Image	Name	Title	Country	Motto	Notes
Carl XVI Gustaf (1973–)
793	20 January 1981		Khalid	King of Saudi Arabia; 1975–82	Saudi Arabia		
794	20 January 1981		Fahd	King of Saudi Arabia; 1982–2005	Saudi Arabia		

== Asia - Far East ==
=== Brunei ===
Carl XVI Gustaf (1973-)
Nr	Date	Image	Name	Title	Land	Motto	Remarque
843	8 February 2004		Hassanal Bolkiah	Sultan of Brunei since 1967	Brunei		
844	8 February 2004		Pengiran Anak Saleha	Queen of Brunei since 1967	Brunei		

=== Bhutan ===
Nr	Date	Image	Name	Title	Country	Motto	Notes
Carl XVI Gustaf (1973–)
	1994		Jigme Singye Wangchuck	King of Bhutan	Bhutan		

=== China ===
Nr	Date	Image	Name	Title	Country	Motto	Notes
Gustaf V (1907–50)
702	4 June 1948		Chiang Kai-shek	President of the Republic of China	Republic of China		*

=== Indonesia ===
Nr	Date	Image	Name	Title	Country	Motto	Notes
Carl XVI Gustaf (1973-)
877	22 May 2017		Joko Widodo	President of Indonesia since 2014	Indonesia	Bhinneka Tunggal Ika	

=== Japan ===
Nr	Date	Image	Name	Title	Country	Motto	Notes
Oscar II (1872–1907)
461	11 December 1881		Meiji	Emperor of Japan 1867–1912	Empire of Japan		
571	20 September 1907		Taishō	Crown Prince of Japan 1888–1912; Emperor of Japan 1912–26	Empire of Japan		Meiji's son
Gustaf V (1907–50)
634	8 May 1919		Shōwa (Hirohito)	Crown Prince of Japan 1912–26; Emperor of Japan 1926–89	Empire of Japan		Taishō's son
668	23 August 1930		Nobuhito	Prince of Japan; Prince Takamatsu	Empire of Japan		Hirohito's brother
Gustaf VI Adolf (1950–73)
721	30 September 1952		Akihito	Crown Prince of Japan 1933–89; Emperor of Japan 1989–2019; Emperor Emeritus of Japan since 2019	Japan		Hirohito's son
733	28 February 1957		Takahito	Prince of Japan; Prince Mikasa	Japan		Hirohito's brother
766	16 December 1968		Setsuko	Princess of Japan; Princess Chichibu	Japan		Hirohito's sister-in-law
Carl XVI Gustaf (1973–)
789	5 March 1980		Kōjun	Empress Consort of Japan	Japan		Hirohito's wife
831	18 May 2000		Michiko	Crown Princess C. of Japan 1959–89; Empress Consort of Japan 1989–2019; Empress Emerita of Japan since 2019	Japan		Akihito's wife
848	16 March 2007		Naruhito	Crown Prince of Japan 1989–2019; Emperor of Japan since 2019	Japan		Akihito's son

=== Malaysia ===
Nr	Date	Image	Name	Title	Country	Motto	Notes
Carl XVI Gustaf (1973–)
819	22 February 1996		Ja'afar of Negeri Sembilan	King of Malaysia (1994–1999)	Malaysia		
847	8 September 2005		Sirajuddin of Perlis	King of Malaysia (2001–2006)	Malaysia	Bersekutu Bertambah Mutu	

=== South Korea ===
Nr	Date	Image	Name	Title	Country	Motto	Notes
Carl XVI Gustaf (1973–)
863	30 May 2012		Lee Myung-bak	President of South Korea; 2008–2013	South Korea		
882	14 June 2019		Moon Jae-in	President of South Korea; 2017–2022	South Korea		

=== Thailand ===
Nr	Date	Image	Name	Title	Country	Motto	Notes
Oscar II (1872–1907)
484	11 July 1887		Chulalongkorn (Rama V)	King of Siam 1868–1910	Siam		
522	14 July 1897		Vajiravudh (Rama VI)	Crown Prince of Siam 1895–1910; King of Siam 1910–25	Siam		Chulalongkorn's son
523	14 July 1897		Svasti Sobhana	Prince Svastivatana Visishtha 1898–1935	Siam		Chulalongkorn's younger brother
Gustaf V (1907–50)
610	10 September 1911		Chakrabongse Bhuvanath	Prince of Bisnulok 1893–1920; Heirs-presumptive to the throne of Siam 1910–1920	Siam		Chulalongkorn's son
672	25 March 1932		Prajadhipok (Rama VII)	King of Siam 1925–35; Prince of Sukhothai 1935–41	Siam		Chulalongkorn's son
707	5 April 1950		Bhumibol Adulyadej (Rama IX)	King of Thailand 1946–2016	Thailand		Chulalongkorn's grandson
Gustaf VI Adolf (1950–73)
747	3 September 1960		Sirikit	Queen Consort of Thailand 1950–2016; Queen Mother of Thailand 2016–2025	Thailand		Bhumibol's consort
759	15 January 1965		Bhanubandhu Yugala	Prince of Thailand	Thailand		Chulalongkorn's grandson
Carl XVI Gustaf (1973–)
836	25 February 2003		Vajiralongkorn (Rama X)	Crown Prince of Thailand 1972–2016; King of Thailand since 2016	Thailand		Bhumibol's son
837	25 February 2003		Sirindhorn	Princess Royal of Thailand since 1977	Thailand		Bhumibol's daughter
838	25 February 2003		Chulabhorn	Princess of Thailand; Princess Srisavangavadhana since 2019	Thailand		Bhumibol's daughter

== See also ==
- List of current knights of the Order of the Seraphim

== Sources ==
- Per Nordenvall, Kungliga Serafimerorden 1748-1998 (1998)
