= Sangweni =

Sangweni is an African surname that may refer to

- Phindiwe Sangweni (born 1963), South African attorney and businesswoman
- Siyabonga Sangweni (born 1981), South African football defender
- Thamsanqa Sangweni (born 1989), South African football midfielder
