= Ermias Sahle Selassie =

Ethiopian prince (born 1960)

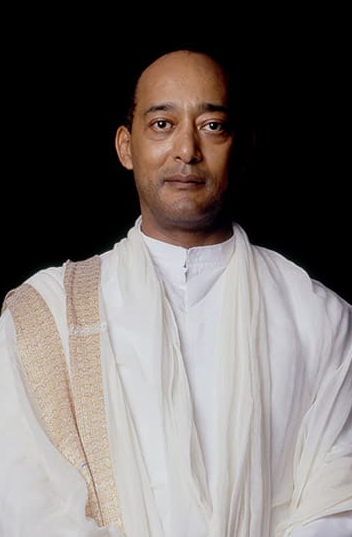
- Ermias in 2020
- Born: 14 June 1960 (age 66); Addis Ababa, Ethiopian Empire
- Spouse: Woizero Gelila Fesseha (m. 1989; div. 2004) Woizero Saba Kebede (m. 2011)
- Issue: Leul Sahle-Selassie Ermias; Leul Fesseha Zion Ermias
- House: House of Solomon
- Father: Sahle Selassie
- Mother: Mahisente Habte Mariam
- Religion: Ethiopian Orthodox Tewahedo

Prince Ermias Sahle-Selassie Haile-Selassie (born 14 June 1960) is the only son of Prince Sahle Selassie of Ethiopia and Princess Mahisente Habte Mariam. He is the grandson of Emperor Haile Selassie of Ethiopia, and furthermore of Dejazmach Habte Mariam Gebre-Igziabiher, also known as Hambisa Kumsa Moroda (Oromo: Hambisaa Kumsaa Morodaa) whose father Kumsa Moroda was the third and last Moti, or ruler, of the Welega kingdom also referred as the Leqa Neqamte state. Currently, Prince Ermias is President of the Crown Council of Ethiopia.

== Education ==
Prince Ermias was educated in Ethiopia, Great Britain, and the United States. In England, he received his education at Old Ride Preparatory School, and then at Haileybury College. He obtained a BA degree in social studies, with an emphasis in economics, from the University of California, Santa Barbara. He continued his education at the Fletcher School of Law and Diplomacy between 1983 and 1985.

Prince Ermias is fluent in Amharic, English and German.

== Family ==
Prince Ermias was first married on 9 June 1989 to Woizero Gelila Fesseha, daughter of Afe-Negus Fesseha Gabre-Selassie, a former Lord Chief Justice of Ethiopia, and by her is the father of twin sons:

- Prince Sahle-Selassie Ermias (known as Christian). Born on 20 February 1992.
- Prince Fesseha Zion Ermias (known as Rufael). Born on 20 February 1992.

Prince Ermias and Woizero Gelila Fesseha later divorced in July 2004. Woizero Gelila Fesseha died on December 9, 2025 in Fairfax, Virginia. On 25 February 2011, Prince Ermias married Woizero Saba Kebede. The Prince and his wife live in the Washington metropolitan area.

== Royal function ==
Prince Ermias currently serves as the President of the Crown Council of Ethiopia in exile. The Crown Council has pursued a mission devoted to promoting a cultural and humanitarian role. Prince Ermias is also patron of the Haile Selassie Fund for Children in Need which continues to sponsor student scholarships, and the St. George of Lalibela Foundation.

On 16 September 2010, Prince Ermias delivered remarks at a briefing entitled "Traditional Leadership in the Modern World: Humanitarianism, Culture and the Diaspora" in the Rayburn House Office Building in Washington, D.C. This briefing was conducted by Representative Diane Watson, who was a member of the House Foreign Affairs Committee, and whose congressional district in Los Angeles includes Little Ethiopia. Empanelled with visiting royalty from Cameroon and the Kingdom of Swaziland (Princess Phindiwe Sangweni), Prince Ermias described the cultural leadership exercised by deposed and exiled royalty among members of ethnic communities living in either ancestral lands or diaspora in the United States and the United Kingdom.

== Honours ==
As President of the Crown Council of Ethiopia since 1993 Prince Ermias is Grand Master of the following Orders belonging to the House of Solomon:

- - The Order of Solomon
- - The Order of the Seal of Solomon
- - The Order of the Queen of Sheba
- - The Order of the Holy Trinity
- - The Order of Menelik II
- - The Order of the Star of Ethiopia

Prince Ermias is also Grand Master of two further dynastic orders which were established 18 years after the fall of the Ethiopian Empire. The Order of Haile Selassie I was founded in 1992 to commemorate the Emperor's 100th birthday. The Order of the Ethiopian Lion was established in 1994 to mark the 100th anniversary of the Battle of Adwa.

- - The Order of Haile Selassie I
- - The Order of the Ethiopian Lion

=== Foreign honours ===
- - Commander, Hungarian Order of Merit (August 2024)

=== Dynastic honours ===
- - Knight Grand Cross of the Royal Order of Francis I - House of Bourbon-Two Sicilies
- - Knight Grand Cross of the Order of Saints Maurice and Lazarus - House of Savoy
- - Knight Grand Collar of the Royal Order of the Drum - Rwandan Royal Family
- - Knight Grand Cordon of the Royal and Hashemite Order of the Pearl - Royal House of Sulu

=== Other awards ===
- Golden Key of the City of Frankfort, Kentucky, (29 May 2013) by Mayor Graham
- Stockholm Cultural Award (24 March 2018) by Princess Marianne Bernadotte
- Keys to the City of Montego Bay, St James (15 October 2022), by Montego Bay Mayor, Leeroy Williams
- Pan-African Award from the Ethiopian Government for Emperor Haile Selassie’s Leading Role in Establishing African Unity, Addis Ababa (1 November 2022), from Ethiopian Prime Minister Dr Abiy Ahmed
- Freedom of the City of London (17 November 2023)
- People of Distinction Humanitarian Award, Washington, DC (13 September 2016)
- Medal of Merit of South Carolina

== See also ==
Line of succession to the Ethiopian Throne
