= Prince Sahle Selassie =

Ethiopian prince (1931–1962)

- Born: 27 February 1931; Menelik Palace, Addis Ababa, Ethiopian Empire
- Died: 24 April 1962 (aged 31); Addis Ababa, Ethiopian Empire
- Burial: Holy Trinity Cathedral
- Spouse: Mahisente Habte Mariam (m. 1959)
- Issue: Ermias Sahle Selassie
Names
- Sahle Aba Dina
- House: House of Solomon
- Father: Haile Selassie
- Mother: Menen Asfaw
- Religion: Ethiopian Orthodox Tewahedo

Prince Sahle Selassie (Amharic: ልኡል ሣህለ ሥላሴ; 27 February 1931 – 24 April 1962) was the youngest child of Emperor Haile Selassie and Empress Menen Asfaw of Ethiopia. His full title was "His Imperial Highness, Prince Sahle Selassie Haile Selassie".

== Biography ==
Born after his parents had been crowned Emperor and Empress of Ethiopia, he was the only one of the Emperor's children to have been born with the title of Prince. Since his older brothers, Prince Asfa Wossen and Prince Makonnen, had both been born before the 1930 coronation, Prince Sahle Selassie was also the first legitimate child born to a reigning Emperor since the birth of Dejazmach Alemayehu Tewodros, son of Emperor Tewodros II. He was educated in the United Kingdom, at Wellington College, Berkshire and Queens' College, Cambridge.

Prince Sahle Selassie was married in 1959 to Princess Mahisente Habte Mariam, the daughter of Dejazmach Habte Mariam Gabre-Igziabiher, the heir to the old Oromo kingdom of Leqa Naqamte in Welega Province, and later served as governor of Welega province. They had a son, Prince Ermias Sahle Selassie, who currently is the President of the Crown Council of Ethiopia. The Prince was a man of an artistic bent, who is said to have made a movie which was banned from publication by the Imperial Government censor despite the fact the Prince was a member of the Imperial family. It was believed that the movie indirectly questioned the fast pace of development, and the strains it caused on rural society, and was thus unflattering to the policies of the Imperial government.

Prince Sahle Selassie died in 1962, months after the death of his mother Empress Menen Asfaw. His cause of death was given as "a liver ailment complicated by pneumonia of both lungs and gastrointestinal hemorrages". He was survived by his wife and his son Prince Ermias, and was buried in the crypt of Holy Trinity Cathedral in Addis Ababa.

== Honours ==
=== National honours ===
- - Grand Cordon of the Order of the Seal of Solomon.
- - Refugee Medal (1944).
- - Jubilee Medal (1955).

=== Foreign honours ===
- - Grand Cross of the Order of the White Lion (Czechoslovakia, 14 December 1959).
- - Knight of the Royal Order of the Seraphim (Kingdom of Sweden, 19 December 1959).
- - Knight Grand Cordon of the Supreme Order of the Chrysanthemum (Japan).
- - Knight Grand Cross of the Order of the House of Orange (Kingdom of the Netherlands).
- - Honorary Knight Grand Cross of the Royal Victorian Order (1958).
- - Knight Grand Cross of the Order of Merit of the Federal Republic of Germany (Federal Republic of Germany, 1955).
- - Sash of the Order of the Aztec Eagle (United Mexican States, 1954).
- - Order of the Yugoslav Star, 1st class (21 July 1954).
- - Knight Grand Cordon of the Order of the Pioneers of Liberia (Republic of Liberia).

== Ancestry ==
Ancestors of Prince Sahle Selassie

16. Dejazmach Wolde Malakot Yamana Krestos
8. Dejazmach Wolde Mikael Wolde Wolde Malakot
17. Woizero Kalama Worq
4. Ras Mäkonnen Wäldä-Mika'él
18. Negus (King) Sahle Selassie of Shewa
9. Immabet Tenagnework Sahle Selassie
19. Woizero Yimegnushal Ayele
2. Emperor Haile Selassie I
10. Dejazmach Ali Abba Jifar
5. Woizero Yeshimebet Ali
22. Ato Yimeru of Gurage
11. Immabet-Hoy Walatta Ihata Giyorgis Yimeru
23. Woizero Araza-Aregai
1. Prince Sahle Selassie of Ethiopia
6. Dejazmach Asfaw Mikael, Jantirar of Ambassel
3. Itege Menen Asfaw
28. Imam Ali Abba Bula
14. Negus (King) Mikael
29. Woizero Getie
7. Woizero Sehin Mikael
30. Gabru
15. Woizero Fantaye
31. Hirut
