= Phindiwe Sangweni =

South African attorney and businesswoman

Phindiwe Dlamini-Sangweni

Personal details
- Born: Phindiwe Rita Dlamini; 2 December 1963 (age 62) Ixopo, KwaZulu-Natal, South Africa
- Spouse: Mhlengi Moses Sangweni (m. 1994; div. 1997)
- Children: Makhosini "Omari" Dlamini; Nikita Dlamini
- Occupation: South African attorney African National Congress member Businesswoman

Phindiwe Dlamini-Sangweni (born 2 December 1963, as Princess Phindiwe Rita Dlamini) is a South African attorney and businesswoman. She is currently a member of the African National Congress and is Chairwoman of Purple Tree Holdings, a private company. Dlamini-Sangweni is a Principal Princess of the Nhlangwini royal family, Princess of the Zulu Royal Family and is a cousin of Mswati III, King of Swaziland. She has assets estimated at US$30 million from various investments and shareholdings on the New York Stock Exchange and Johannesburg Stock Exchange.

Dlamini-Sangweni was the first black and first female director of the Constitutional Court of South Africa, in which she served from 2002 to 2005. She then served as the executive advisor of Smangaliso Mkhatshwa, before serving as The Chief State Law Advisor of the Eastern Cape Province from 2013 to 2017.

== Early life ==
Dlamini-Sangweni was born in Ixopo. Her parents were Inkosi C Dlamini and Inkosikati H Dlamini. At the age of two her family moved to Umzinto, and in 1980, she graduated from Sacred Heart College for Girls, Verulam.

== Education & career ==
In 1993, Dlamini-Sangweni received a B. Proc degree in law from the University of Natal. In 2005, she served as the executive advisor of Smangaliso Mkhatshwa, the executive Mayor of Pretoria.

On 16 September 2010 Dlamini-Sangweni delivered remarks at a briefing entitled "Traditional Leadership in the Modern World: Humanitarianism, Culture and the Diaspora" in the Rayburn House Office Building in Washington, D.C. conducted by Congressmember Diane Watson, a member of the House Foreign Affairs Committee, whose Los Angeles district includes Little Ethiopia. Empaneled with visiting royalty from Cameroon and Ethiopia (Prince Ermias Sahle Selassie), she described the cultural leadership exercised by reigning and deposed royalty among members of ethnic communities living in either ancestral lands or diaspora in the United Kingdom.

== Children and marriage ==
Dlamini-Sangweni has two children. In 1994, she married Mhlengi Moses Sangweni, until their divorce in 1997. She has a son, Makhosini "Omari" Dlamini, born 1 December 1991, and a daughter, Nikita Dlamini, born 1995.
