= Mahisente Habte Mariam =

Ethiopian royal member (born 1937)

Princess Mahisente Habte Mariam
- Born: 9 February 1937 (age 89); Nekemte, Ethiopian Empire
- Spouse: Prince Sahle Selassie (m. 1959; died 1962)
- Issue: Ermias Sahle Selassie
Names
- Mahzente (or Mahisente)
- House: House of Solomon (by marriage)
- Father: Dejazmach Habte Mariam Gebre-Igziabiher
- Mother: Woizero Yeshimebet Guma
- Religion: Ethiopian Orthodox Tewahedo

Princess Mahisente Habte Mariam (born 9 February 1937) is the widow of Prince Sahle Selassie, youngest son of Emperor Haile Selassie of Ethiopia. She is the daughter of Dejazmach Habte Mariam Gebre-Igziabiher, also referred as Hambisa Kumsa Moroda (Oromo: Hambisaa Kumsaa Morodaa) heir to the former Welega Kingdom of Leqa Naqamte, and later served as governor of welega Province. Her mother was Woizero Yeshimebet Guma, granddaughter of Moti (King) Jote Tulu of Western Welega, an Oromo noblewoman who was later married to Ras Mesfin Selashi, a leading Ethiopian aristocrat and close associate of Emperor Haile Selassie. Princess Mahisente is also the mother of Prince Ermias Sahle Selassie, the current President of the Crown Council of Ethiopia.

Princess Mahisente worked for many years with the United Nations Children's Fund (UNICEF) before her retirement. The princess currently lives in the suburbs of Washington D.C. She is the last surviving daughter-in-law of Emperor Haile Selassie.

== Honours ==
=== National ===
- - Grand Cordon of the Order of the Queen of Sheba.
- - Jubilee Medal (1966).

=== Foreign honours ===
- - Member of the Royal Order of the Seraphim (Kingdom of Sweden, 19 December 1959).
