= Crown Council of Ethiopia =

Constitutional body of the Ethiopian Empire

- Royal Coat of Arms

- Flag
- Abbreviation: Crown Council
- Founded at: Ethiopian Empire
- Type: Community organization Cultural center
- Legal status: Constitutional Body; Former Government-in-exile of Ethiopia and Eritrea
- Location: Alexandria, Virginia
- Region served: Ethiopia – Ethiopian Community and Diaspora; Eritrea – Eritrean Community and Diaspora; Habesha Community
- Emperor: Zera Yacob Amha Selassie
- President: Prince Ermias Sahle Selassie
- Website: Official website

The Crown Council of Ethiopia is a community organization and cultural center with the mission of preserving the culture(s) of the former Ethiopian Empire, as well as promoting development and humanitarian efforts. Today, the Crown Council has abandoned its former mission of being a Government-in-exile, redefining its role as a humanitarian and cultural preservation organization representing Ethiopians, Eritreans, and their diaspora. It is headquartered in the Washington, D.C. Metropolitan Area in the United States, where a large concentration of Ethiopian Americans and Eritrean Americans are located.

It originated as a constitutional body within the Ethiopian Empire, which were appointed by and advised the reigning Emperor of Ethiopia (Ge'ez: ንጉሠ ነገሥት, Nəgusä Nägäst); on occasion, its members acted on behalf of the Crown. After the deposition of the monarchy, the Crown Council of Ethiopia acted as the government-in-exile of the Ethiopian Empire once claiming to be the legitimate government of Ethiopia and Eritrea. On 28 July 2004, the Crown Council abandoned its Government-in-exile status, relinquishing its claim of legitimate governance to the governments of Ethiopia and Eritrea.

The Communist Derg military junta deposed the last Emperor, Haile Selassie I, in a coup d'état on 12 September 1974, and dissolved the council. Most members of the council were imprisoned and executed, including its president, Prince Asrate Medhin Kassa. The Derg announced that the monarchy had been abolished early in the following year. However, in 1993, a new Crown Council — which included several descendants of the late Haile Selassie I — asserted that the title of Emperor of Ethiopia was still in existence, and the Crown Council would act in its interests. Its justification was that the abolition of the monarchy by the Derg was extra-constitutional and carried out illegally.

The Federal Constitution of 1995 confirmed the status of the country as a republic, but Ethiopian royalists continue to operate the Crown Council. The Ethiopian government has however continued to accord members of the Imperial family their princely titles as a matter of courtesy. On 16 March 2005, Prince Ermias Sahle Selassie was reaffirmed by his second cousin Prince Zera Yacob as the President of the Crown Council of Ethiopia. Prince Zera Yacob is considered to be the Crown Prince of Ethiopia. On July 28, 2004, the Crown Council redefined its role by redirecting its mission from the political realm to a mission of cultural preservation, development and humanitarian efforts in Ethiopia.

== List of presidents ==
No.	Portrait	Name (Birth–Death)	Tenure			Emperor
No.	Portrait	Name (Birth–Death)	Took office	Left office	Duration	Emperor
1		Prince Kassa Haile Darge (1881–1956)	13 July 1941	16 November 1956	15 years, 126 days	Haile Selassie I
Vacant 1956–1971						Haile Selassie I
2		Prince Aserate Kassa (1922–1974)	July; 1971	12 September 1974	3 years, 2 months	Haile Selassie I
3		Prince Ermias Sahle Selassie (born 1960)	15 July 1993	Incumbent	33 years, 110 days	Amha Selassie
3		Prince Ermias Sahle Selassie (born 1960)	15 July 1993	Incumbent	33 years, 110 days	Prince Zera Yacob Amha Selassie

== See also ==
- Politics of Ethiopia
- Solomonic dynasty
- List of emperors of Ethiopia
