= Marielund =

Marielund may refer to:

- Marielund, a village in Haparanda Municipality, Sweden
- Marielund, a village in Strängnäs Municipality, Sweden
- Marielund, a village in Uppsala Municipality, Sweden
- Marielund, a manor house located in Karlskrona Municipality, Sweden

== See also ==
- Marielund railway station, Upsala-Lenna Jernväg, Sweden
