= List of governors of Södermanland County =

Governor of Södermanland County
- Landshövding i Södermanlands län
- Coat of arms of Södermanland County.
- Incumbent; Johanna Sandwall; Acting since 1 April 2025
- Södermanland County Administrative Board
- Residence: The residence in Nyköping, Nyköping
- Appointer: Government of Sweden
- Term length: Six years (Note: The governor is often appointed for a six-year mandate. It can be extended if the person has not reached retirement age.)
- Formation: 1634
- First holder: Stellan Otto Mörner
- Deputy: County Director (Länsrådet)
- Salary: SEK 97,800/month (2017)
- Website: Governor Liselott Hagberg

This is a list of governors of Nyköping County and Södermanland County of Sweden, from 1634 to present.

Governors of Nyköping County before 1683:

- Stellan Otto Mörner (1634)
- Peder Erlandsson Bååt (1634–1637)
- Knut Göransson Posse (1637–1640)
- Hans Rotkirch (1640–1648)
- Gustaf Bonde (1648–1653)
- Göran Bengtsson Sparre af Rossvik (1653–1657)
- Erik Carlsson Sparre (1657–1678)
- Gabriel Falkenberg af Trustorp (1678–1693)

Governors of Nyköping County / Södermanland County after
the merger with Eskilstunahus County and Gripsholm County in 1683:

- Gabriel Falkenberg af Trustorp (1678–1693)
- Hans Clerck (1693–1710)
- Peder Franc (1710–1714)
- Peter Schetter (1714–1716)
- Gerdmund Cederhielm (1716–1723)
- Nils Gyllenstierna (1723–1727)
- Mikael Törnflykt (1727–1732)
- Jonas Fredrik Örnfelt (1732–1733)
- Olof Gyllenborg (1733–1737)
- Carl Gustaf Sparre (1737–1739)
- Nils Bonde af Björnö (1739–1750)
- Carl Mårten Fleetwood (1750–1751)
- Claes Gustaf Rålamb (1751–1761)
- Nils Adam Bielke (1761–1769)
- Jeremias Wallén (1769)
- Per Abraham Löth Örnsköld (1769–1791)
- Carl Lagerbring (1792–1794)
- Salomon J Gyllenadler (1794–1804)
  - Fabian Ulfsparre af Broxvik (acting 1803–1806)
- Fabian Ulfsparre af Broxvik (1806–1815)
- Per Erik Sköldebrand (1815–1824)
- Gustaf Abraham Peijron (1824–1832)
- Gustaf Erik Frölich (1833–1858)
- Gustaf Lagerbielke (1858–1888)
- Otto H Roland Prinssköld (1889–1894)
- Filip August Boström (1894–1906)
- Carl L A E Reutersköld (1906–1927)
- Gustaf Robert Sederholm (1927–1935)
- Bo Gustaf H Hammarskjöld (1935–1958)
  - Anders Victor Benedict Wijkman (acting 1940–1944)
- Erik Gustaf Andersson (1958)
- Ossian Alfons Sehlstedt (1958–1970)
- Mats Herman Lemne (1970–1980)
- Bengt Theodor Gustavsson (1980–1990)
- Stig Ivar Nordberg (1990–1996)
- Bo Holmberg (1996–2005)
- Bo Könberg (2006–2012)
- Liselott Hagberg (2012–2020)
- Beatrice Ask (2020–2025)
  - Johanna Sandwall (acting; 2025– )
