= Torshälla huvud =

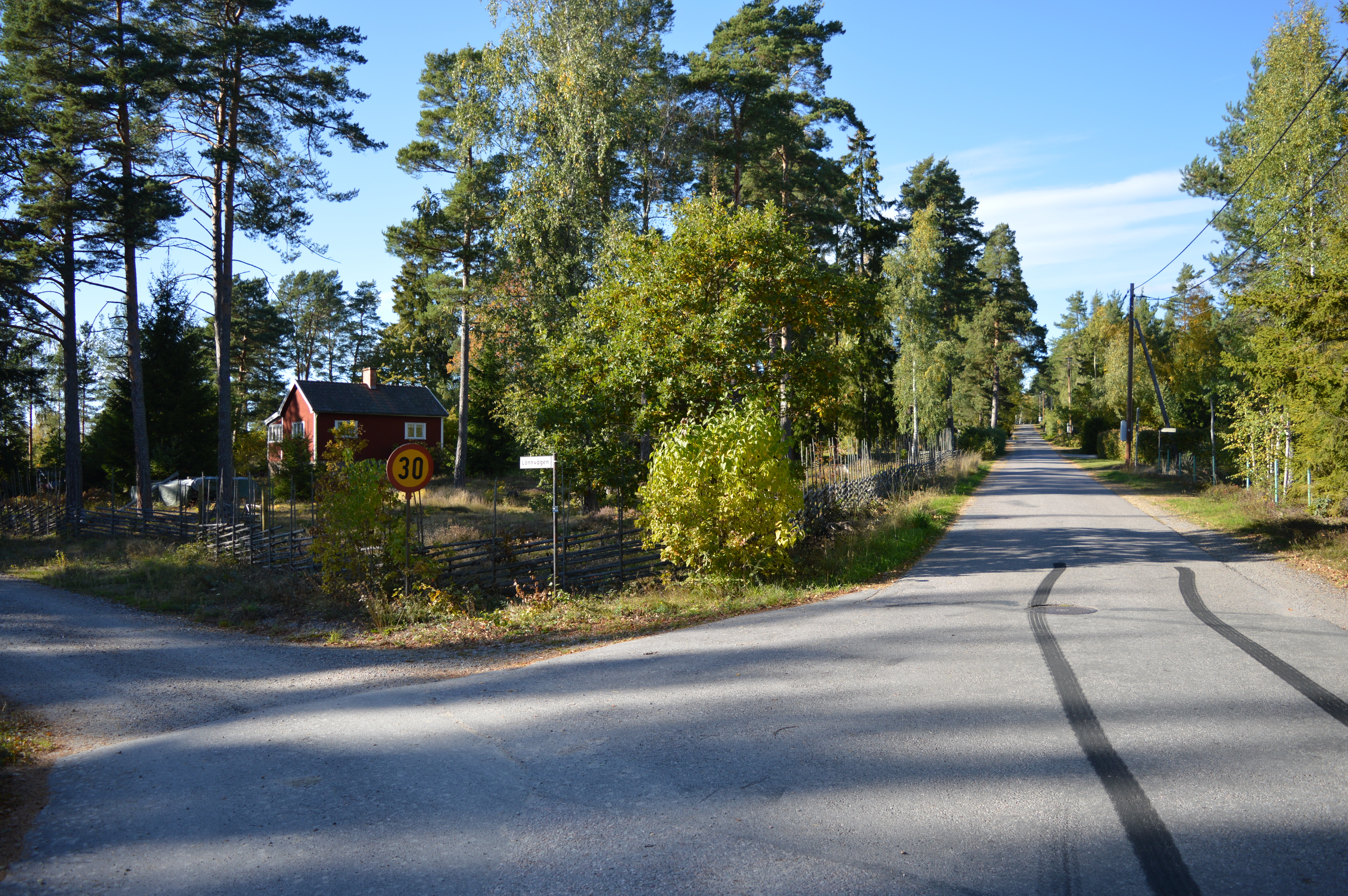

- Location within Södermanland Location within Sweden
- Coordinates: 59°27′N 16°26′E
- Country: Sweden
- Province: Södermanland
- County: Södermanland County
- Municipality: Eskilstuna Municipality

Area
  - Total: 1.39 km^{2} (0.54 sq mi)

Population (31 December 2010)
  - Total: 492
  - Density: 355/km^{2} (920/sq mi)
- Time zone: UTC+1 (CET)
  - Summer (DST): UTC+2 (CEST)

Torshälla huvud is a locality situated in Eskilstuna Municipality, Södermanland County, Sweden with 492 inhabitants in 2010.
