= Hedvig Lindahl =

Swedish footballer (born 1983)

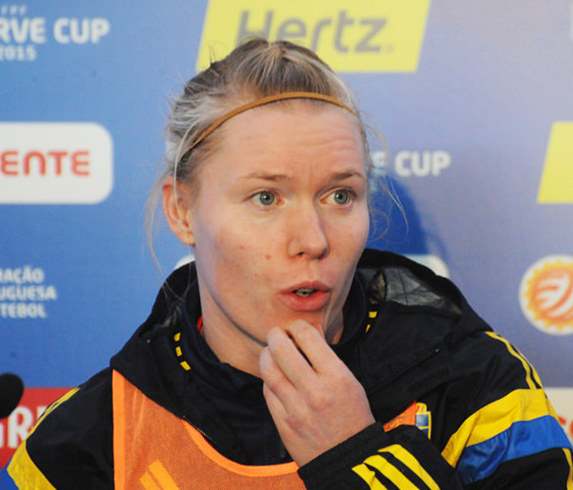
- Lindahl at the 2015 Algarve Cup

Personal information
- Full name: Rut Hedvig Lindahl
- Date of birth: 29 April 1983 (age 43)
- Place of birth: Katrineholm, Sweden
- Height: 1.77 m (5 ft 10 in)
- Position: Goalkeeper

Youth career
- 1987–1994: Gropptorps IF
- 1994–1996: Baggetorps IF

Senior career*
Years	Team	Apps	(Gls)
1996–1998	DFK Värmbol		
1998–2000	Tunafors SK		
2001–2003	Malmö FF		
2003	→ IF Trion (loan)		
2004–2008	Linköpings FC		
2009–2010	Kopparbergs/Göteborg FC	43	(0)
2011–2014	Kristianstads DFF	74	(0)
2015–2019	Chelsea	45	(0)
2019–2020	VfL Wolfsburg	17	(0)
2020–2022	Atlético Madrid	19	(0)
2022–2023	Djurgården	12	(0)
2024	Eskilstuna United	7	(0)

International career^{‡}
2002–2022	Sweden	189	(0)
Medal record
Women's football
Representing Sweden
Olympic Games
Silver medal – second place	2016 Rio de Janeiro	Team
Silver medal – second place	2020 Tokyo	Team
FIFA Women's World Cup
Silver medal – second place	2003 United States	Team
Bronze medal – third place	2011 Germany	Team
Bronze medal – third place	2019 France	Team
- * Club domestic league appearances and goals as of 6 May 2024 ‡ National team caps and goals as of 12:28 15 October 2023 (UTC)

Rut Hedvig Lindahl (born 29 April 1983) is a retired Swedish professional footballer who played as a goalkeeper. She played club football in Sweden for Damallsvenskan clubs including Malmö FF, Linköpings FC, Kristianstads DFF, Kopparbergs/Göteborg FC, Djurgården, and Eskilstuna United, as well as Chelsea in the English FA WSL. At international, Lindahl has accrued 189 caps for Sweden. On 3 August 2014, Lindahl played her 100th cap for Sweden against England. On 17 September 2015, Lindahl played her 113th cap and thereby broke Elisabeth Leidinge's record to become the most capped Swedish female goalkeeper.

She has kept goal for Sweden at the UEFA Women's Championship, the FIFA Women's World Cup and the Olympic Games. Lindahl was the Swedish women's goalkeeper of the year in 2004, 2005, 2009, 2014, 2015, 2016, 2017, 2018, 2019, and 2021. She won the 2015 and 2016 Diamantbollen, after being one of three nominations for Damallsvenskan's Most Valuable Player in 2014. In 2016, Lindahl was one of 5 nominees for Women's PFA Players' Player of the Year and was also picked for the WSL Team of the Year.

== Early career ==
At the age of 13 Lindahl decided to focus on becoming a professional football player. Previously Lindahl had played both as a forward and a goalkeeper, but eventually concentrated on goalkeeping. Lindahl, who was raised in Marmorbyn, was selected to play on the Sörmland team. This was a temporary team for which the best age group football players in Södermanland were selected to play.

Lindahl's national team career began in 1998 when as a part of the Sörmland team she participated at an Elite Girls Camp in Halmstad. There she was selected for the Allstar Team, where the best football players born −83 participated. Each 15-year-old footballer was measured on a five-point scale. Lindahl received rarely awarded full marks; five out of five.

== Club career ==
Lindahl started her club career at Gropptorps IF, outside Katrineholm in Södermanland, a boys' team. Lindahl then played for Torp IF, DFK Värmbol and Tunafors SK.

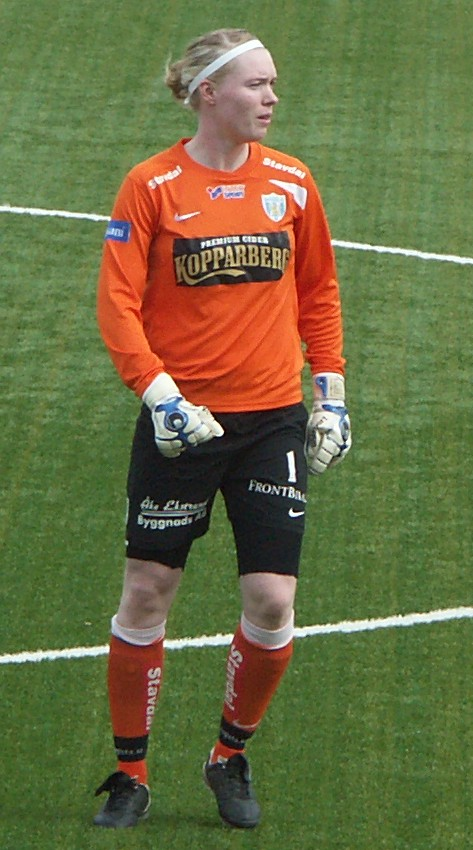
Lindahl playing for Göteborg

She moved into the Damallsvenskan with Malmö FF Dam in 2001 after being scouted by Malmö and Sweden national youth team coach Elisabeth Leidinge. During her three seasons at Malmö, Lindahl faced strong competition from the national team goalkeeper at the time Caroline Jönsson. She finished the 2003 season on loan to IF Trion, then spent five seasons with Linköpings FC, joining Kopparbergs/Göteborg FC in 2009.

Despite 21 shutouts in 43 matches during two seasons with Göteborg, coach Torbjörn Nilsson did not renew Lindahl's contract. Instead she moved to ambitious Kristianstads DFF in time for the 2011 season.

Lindahl signed for London-based FA WSL club Chelsea Ladies in December 2014. After four "clean sheets" in her first five games, Chelsea coach Emma Hayes hailed Lindahl as the best goalkeeper in the WSL.

At the 2015 FA Women's Cup Final, staged at Wembley Stadium for the first time, Lindahl kept goal in Chelsea's 1–0 win over Notts County. It was Chelsea's first major trophy. In October 2015 she also started Chelsea's 4–0 win over Sunderland which secured the club's first FA WSL title and a League and Cup "double". In April 2019, Lindahl announced she would depart Chelsea at the end of the 2018–19 campaign after four seasons with the club.

On 17 July 2019, Lindahl signed a one-year deal with VfL Wolfsburg.

In 2020, Lindahl signed for Spanish Liga F side Atlético Madrid Femenino.

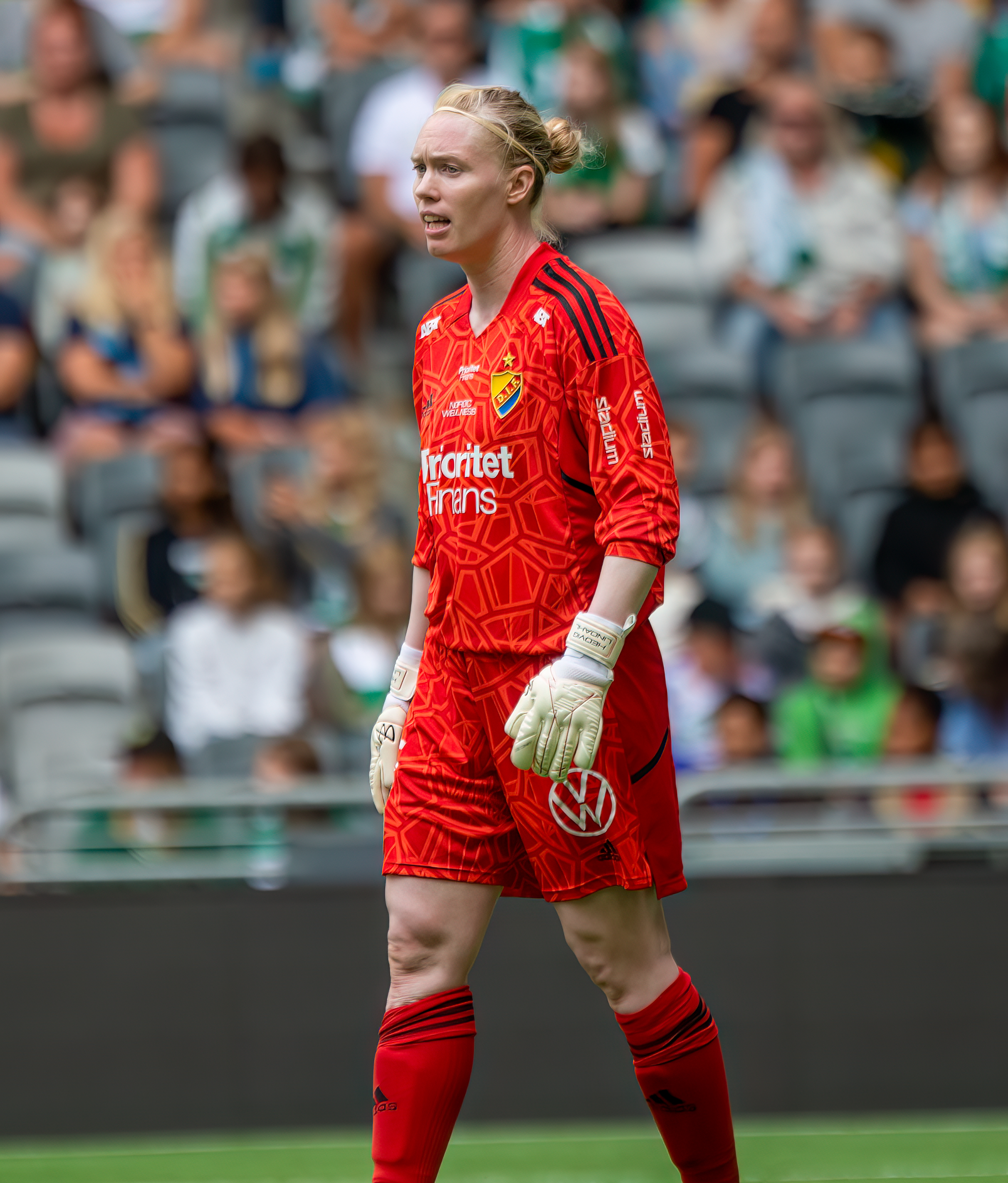
Hedvig Lindahl for Djurgården

Lindahl returned to her native Sweden in 2022 with Djurgårdens IF. In July 2023, she left the club after both parties agreed to terminate her contract, after Lindahl had posted on social media calling into question elements of the fan culture and being pictured signing a shirt for a fan of Djurgårdens' rivals Hammarby IF.

Following a spell at Eskilstuna United in 2024, Lindahl announced her retirement from playing. She played her very last game on 25 May 2024.

== International career ==
Lindahl was on the U21 national team as of 1998 and subsequently progressed to the full Swedish women's national team.

Despite her position as second goalkeeper at club level, Lindahl gained the confidence of the then national team coach Marika Domanski-Lyfors, which led to Lindahl's 2002 debut in the senior women's national team and a silver medal in the 2003 FIFA Women's World Cup.

Lindahl has indicated that her senior international debut came in January 2002, a 5–0 win over England in a behind closed doors match in La Manga. Proud of her debut "clean sheet", she has expressed irritation at reports which sometimes confuse that match with Sweden's 6–3 win over England at the Algarve Cup six weeks later.

After moving to Linköpings and securing first team football at club level, Lindahl began to compete more equally with Caroline Jönsson and Sofia Lundgren for appearances at international level. She understudied Jönsson at the 2004 Olympics. By the time of UEFA Women's Euro 2005 in England, Lindahl was Sweden's first choice goalkeeper and played in all three group games, as well as the extra-time semi final defeat to rivals Norway.

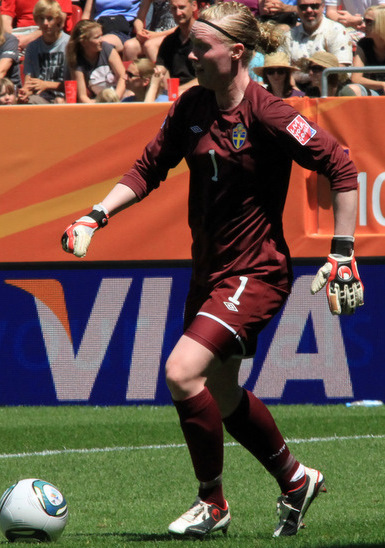
Lindahl as goalkeeper for Sweden in the 2011 World Cup

Incoming national team coach Thomas Dennerby retained Lindahl and she featured at both the 2007 FIFA Women's World Cup and 2008 Olympics in China and UEFA Women's Euro 2009 in Finland. She remained Sweden's number one goalkeeper for the 2011 FIFA Women's World Cup in Germany, where Sweden came third, and the 2012 London Olympics.

In September 2012, Lindahl suffered an anterior cruciate ligament injury while playing for Kristianstad. She was recalled to new coach Pia Sundhage's national squad in May 2013, ahead of UEFA Women's Euro 2013 in Sweden. During Lindahl's absence Kristin Hammarström had taken over the national team's goalkeeper position and remained in place as hosts Sweden lost 1–0 to Germany in the semi-final.

In September 2014, Lindahl underwent elective double hip surgery for an impingement that she had been suffering from since late 2013. Although she had been in pain throughout the year, she played one of her best seasons. She chose the surgery as she was determined to play in the 2015 FIFA Women's World Cup and did not want to risk her body failing during the tournament, if selected. Delaying the surgery would also have carried with it the risk of a double hip replacement for Lindahl in the future. She was called back to the national squad for the 2015 Algarve Cup.

At the 2015 FIFA Women's World Cup, Lindahl was back as Sweden's first choice goalkeeper. In the team's 4–1 second round loss to Germany, she made several saves to prevent an even heavier defeat. In November 2015, Lindahl won the Diamantbollen, the award for Sweden's female player of the year.

== Personal life ==
Lindahl suffers from vitiligo and has to apply high factor sunscreen before and during matches. She married her wife Sabine in 2011. They have two children together born in 2014 and 2017. Lindahl's father was a footballer for IFK Norrköping in the 1970s. She speaks fluent English.

== Honours ==
Linköpings FC

- Svenska Cupen: 2006, 2008

Chelsea

- FA Women's Super League: 2015, 2017–18
- Women's FA Cup: 2014–15, 2017–18

VfL Wolfsburg

- Bundesliga: 2019–20
- DFB-Pokal: 2019–20

Sweden

- Summer Olympic Games: runner-up 2016, 2021
- FIFA Women's World Cup: runner-up 2003, third place 2011, 2019
- Algarve Cup: 2009, 2018, third place 2006, 2010
