= Skogstorp, Eskilstuna Municipality =

Skogstorp
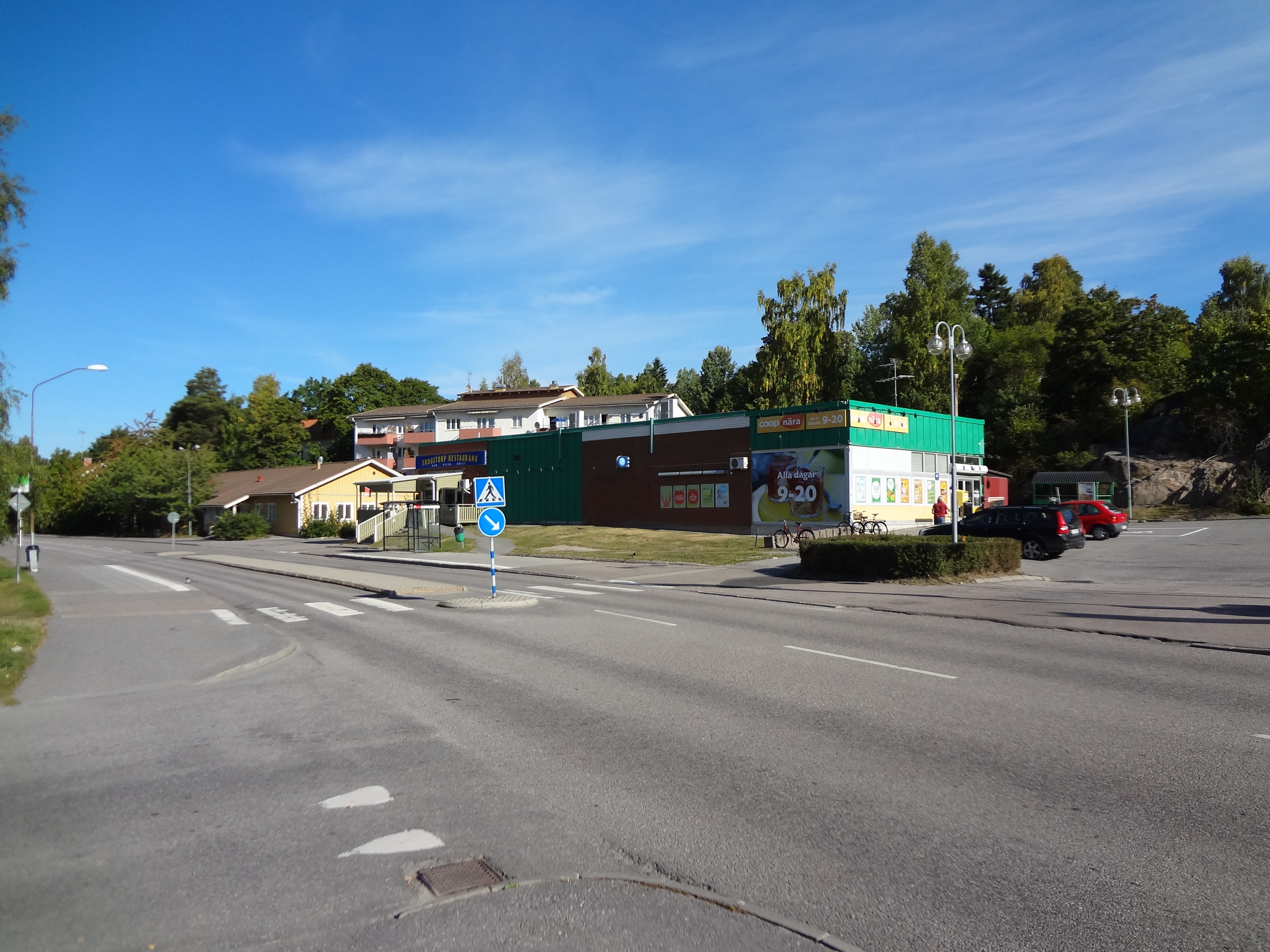
- Skogstorp in September 2013

- Location within Södermanland Location within Sweden
- Coordinates: 59°20′N 16°28′E
- Country: Sweden
- Province: Södermanland
- County: Södermanland County
- Municipality: Eskilstuna Municipality

Area
  - Total: 2.65 km^{2} (1.02 sq mi)

Population (31 December 2010)
  - Total: 2,860
  - Density: 1,081/km^{2} (2,800/sq mi)
- Time zone: UTC+1 (CET)
  - Summer (DST): UTC+2 (CEST)

Skogstorp is a locality situated in Eskilstuna Municipality, Södermanland County, Sweden with 2,860 inhabitants in 2010.
