= Alberga =

Alberga may refer to:

- Alberga, Sweden, a locality in Eskilstuna Municipality, Södermanland County, Sweden
- Ålberga, a locality in Nyköping Municipality, Södermanland County, Sweden
- Leppävaara, known as Alberga in Swedish, a district of Espoo, Finland

== People with the surname ==
- Adriaan Alberga (1887–1952), Prime Minister of Suriname
- Eleanor Alberga (born 1949), Jamaican composer

== See also ==
- Alberga Creek, South Australia, a town in South Australia
