= Södermanland Runic Inscription 84 =

Coordinates: 59.4257°N 16.3388°E

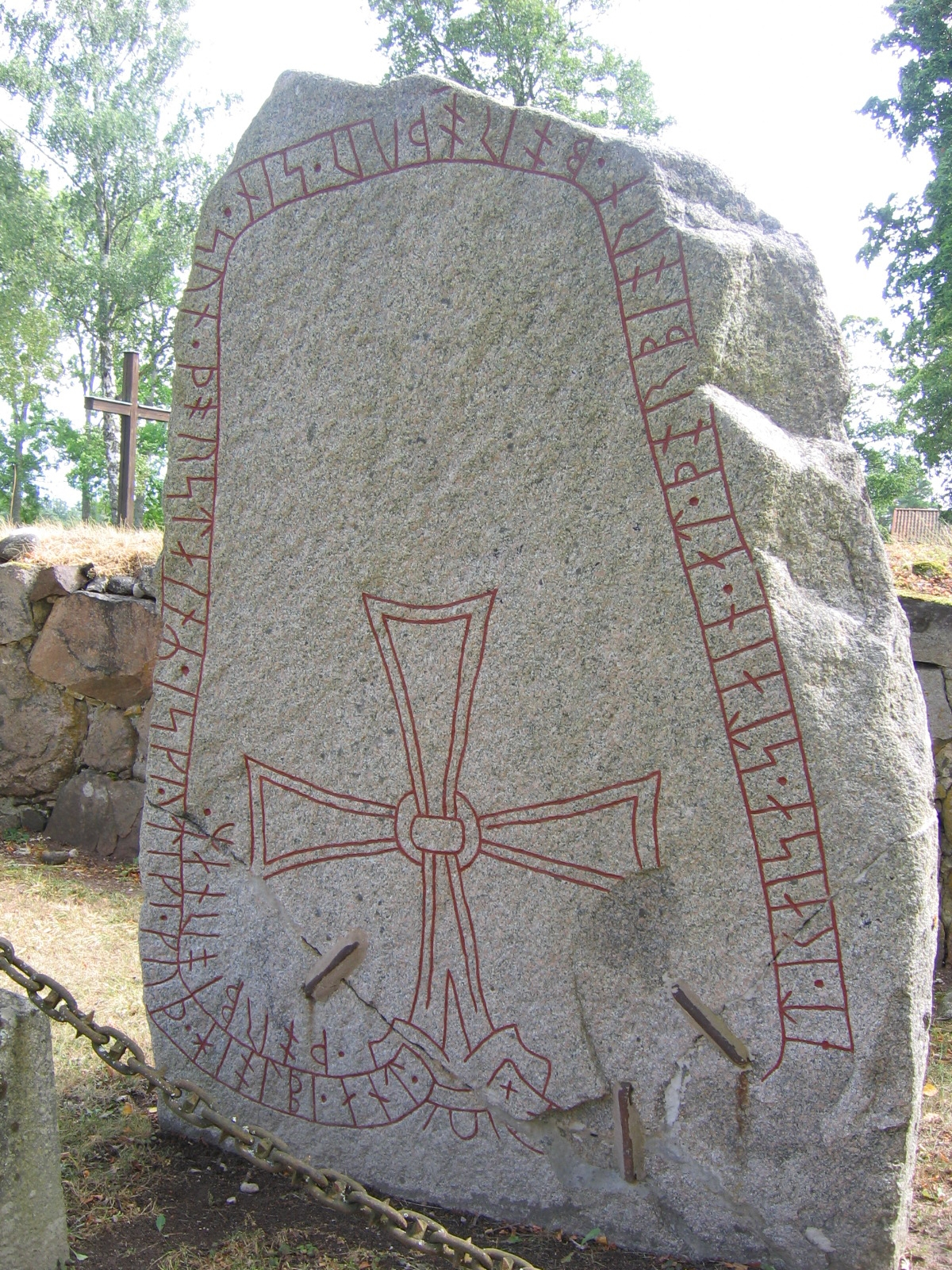
Runestone Sö 84 in Tumbo, Sweden.

Södermanland Runic Inscription 84 or Sö 84 is the Rundata designation for a runic inscription on a Viking Age memorial runestone located in Tumbo, Södermanland County, Sweden, and in the historic province of Södermanland.

== Description ==
This inscription is on a granite runestone is 1.8 meters in height and consists of a Christian cross surrounded by a runic serpent text band. The place name Skyttingi in the runic text, sometimes read as Skytiki, refers to the modern hamlet of Skyttinge located in Tumbo parish. The inscription is classified as being carved in runestone style KB, which is the designation used for runestones with crosses circled with a runic inscription.

The runic text indicates that the stone was raised as a memorial to someone's brother named Þorbjôrn and ends with a prayer for his soul. Although the memorial stone has a Christian cross on it, two of the personal names in the inscription include the Norse pagan god Thor as a theophoric name element. Þorbjôrn translates as "Thor's Bear" and Þorsteinn as "Thor's Stone." The names in the Sö 84 inscription also reflect a common practice of that time in Scandinavia of repeating an element in a parent's name in the names of the children. Here the Þor from the father's name, Þorsteinn, is repeated in the name of the son, Þorbjôrn, to show the family relationship.

== Inscription ==
=== Transliteration of the runes into Latin characters ===
× a...ʀ ...et * raisa * stain * at * þorbiorn * boroþur * sin * sun * þorstainʀ * i skytiki * kuþ * hiolbi * ant * ¶ * þorbiornaʀ *

=== Transcription into Old Norse ===
... [l]ét reisa stein at Þorbjôrn, bróður sinn, son Þorsteins í Skyttingi. Guð hjalpi ônd Þorbjarnar.

=== Translation in English ===
... had the stone raised in memory of Þorbjôrn, his brother, Þorsteinn of Skyttingi's son. May God help Þorbjôrn's spirit.
