= Gustaf Törnros =

Swedish long-distance runner

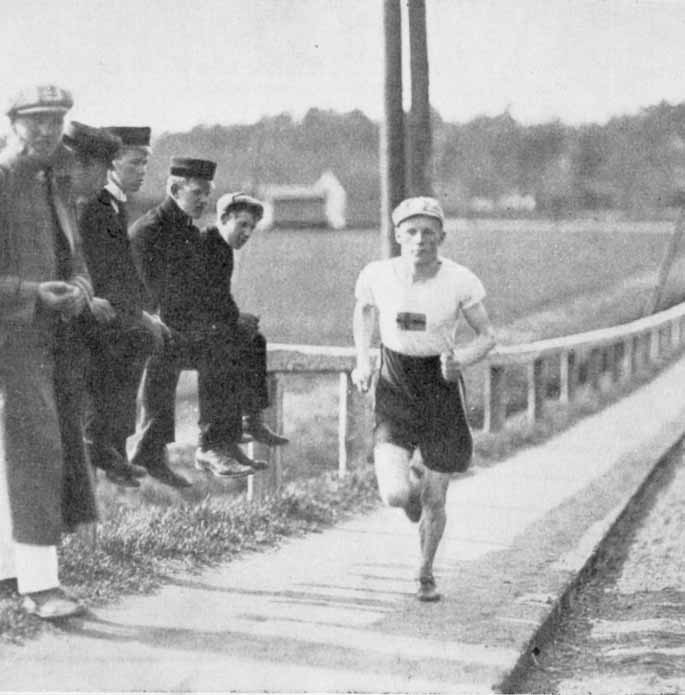
- Törnros at the 1908 Olympics

Personal information
- Nationality: Swedish
- Born: 18 March 1887 Hållsta, Sweden
- Died: 2 April 1941 (aged 54) Stockholm, Sweden
- Height: 1.65 m (5 ft 5 in)
- Weight: 62 kg (137 lb)

Sport
- Sport: Athletics
- Event: 5000 m – marathon
- Club: Fredrikshofs IF, Stockholm

Achievements and titles
- Personal best(s): 5000 m – 15:51.2 (1908); 10000 m – 33:31.6 (1910); Marathon – 3:01:00 (1906)

Gustaf Edvard Törnros (18 March 1887 – 2 April 1941) was a Swedish long-distance runner. He competed in the marathon at the 1906, 1908 and 1912 Summer Olympics with the best result of fourth place in 1906. Half of the participants, including Törnros, failed to finish the 1912 marathon due to the hot weather with temperatures exceeding 30 °C. Törnros won the national marathon title in 1911 and 1912.
