= Sundbyholm =

- Location within Södermanland Location within Sweden
- Coordinates: 59°26′N 16°37′E
- Country: Sweden
- Province: Södermanland
- County: Södermanland County
- Municipality: Eskilstuna Municipality

Area
  - Total: 0.75 km^{2} (0.29 sq mi)

Population (31 December 2020)
  - Total: 1,100
  - Density: 1,500/km^{2} (3,800/sq mi)
- Time zone: UTC+1 (CET)
  - Summer (DST): UTC+2 (CEST)

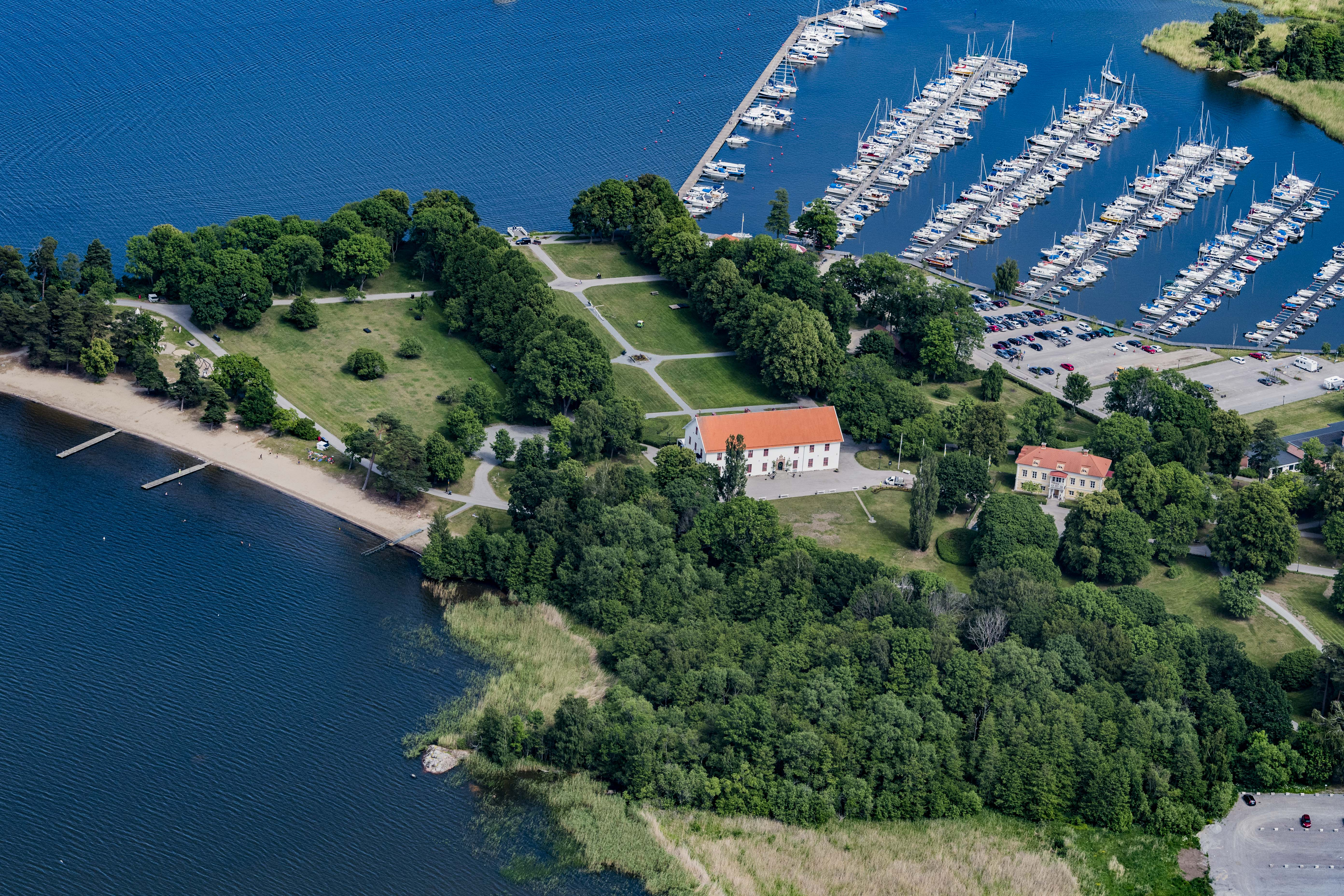

Sundbyholm is a locality situated in Eskilstuna Municipality, Södermanland County, Sweden with 485 inhabitants in 2010.
