= Eskilstuna House =

Coordinates: 59.372°N 16.525°E

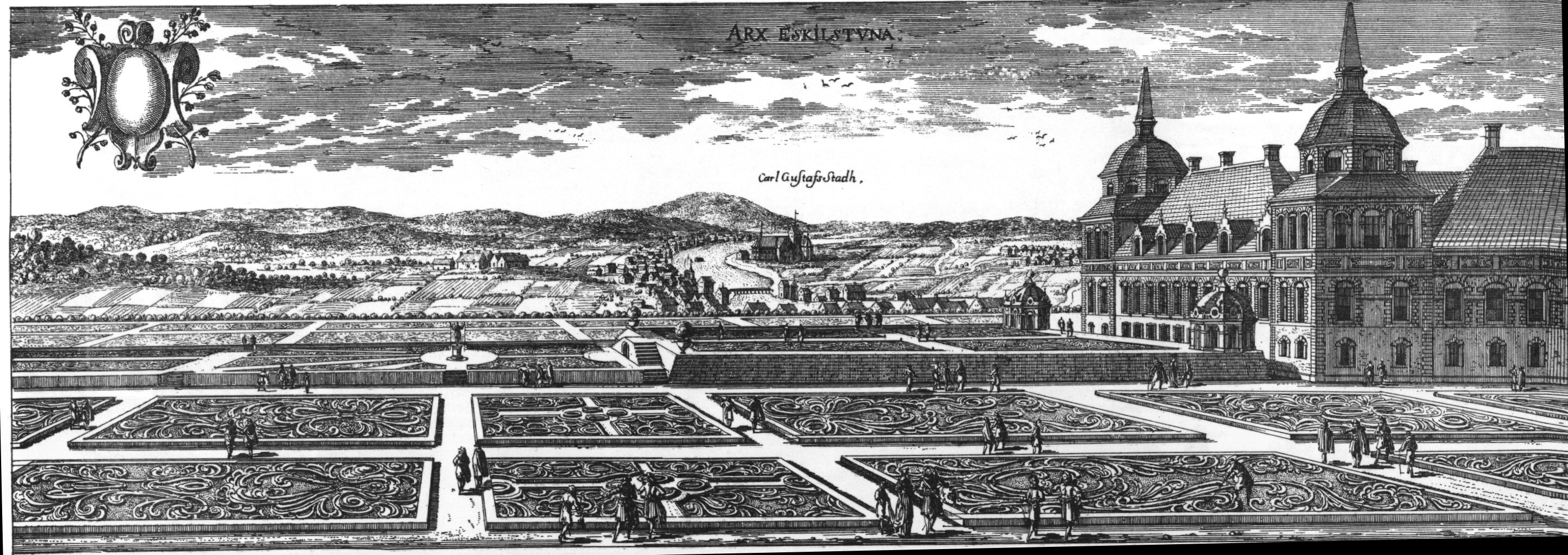
Eskilstuna House with gardens in the late 17th century. From Erik Dahlberg's propaganda work Suecia antiqua et hodierna. Details and scale have likely been exaggerated.

Eskilstuna House (Swedish: Eskilstunahus) was a royal palace in Eskilstuna, in present-day Södermanland County, Sweden. It was erected on the site of a medieval monastery in the 16th century, and was later destroyed in a fire in 1680. The palace was the county seat of Eskilstunahus County during its existence, before its merger into Södermanland County in 1683.

== History ==
=== Conversion from monastery to royal residence ===
The palace and its gardens were located on the site where the first church in the area had been erected by Saint Eskil. In the late 12th century or early 13th century a monastery belonging to the Hospitallers had been established here, which later was confiscated during the Swedish Reformation in 1527. King Gustav I had the monastery rebuilt into a royal palace. He and his sons occasionally used Eskilstuna House as a royal residence. Duke John's daughter Anna was born in the palace during his stay here in May 1568, and in June the same year the rebellion of the dukes John and Charles against their royal brother King Eric XIV was launched from the palace, leading to the imprisonment of Eric and the ascension of Duke John to the throne as John III. In 1589 Mary of the Palatinate, the first wife of Duke Charles (later King Charles IX) died in Eskilstuna House.

=== Renaissance palace ===
The majority of the renaissance palace was constructed sometime after 1585 during Charles IX's reign as Duke of Södermanland, and it was completed by his son, Prince Charles Philip, during the early 17th century. The palace was two stories high, approximately 80 meters square (260 feet) and built around a square court. The south façade had two towers with domed roofs.

The establishment of an ironworking industry close to Eskilstuna House in the 17th century transformed Eskilstuna into an industrial city. A plan drawn by Jean de la Vallée in 1658 for a new palace north of Eskilstunaån existed but was never realised.

=== Fire and modern day remnants ===
A fire in 1680 destroyed most of the upper levels of Eskilstuna House, only sparing the basements, which remained in use as a local prison. The palace was never rebuilt; instead, the seat of the county administration was permanently moved to Nyköping in 1683. Some of the material from the ruins was later used in the construction of the present Royal Palace of Stockholm.

Presently, a school named after the palace and a cemetery belonging to Eskilstuna Parish are located on the site. Some remnants of the foundations are still visible in the cemetery.

== External sources ==
- Nordisk familjebok (2nd ed., 1907), Eskilstuna
