= Skiftinge =

Urban area in Eskilstuna Municipality, Sweden

Coordinates: 59°23′35″N 16°32′28″E

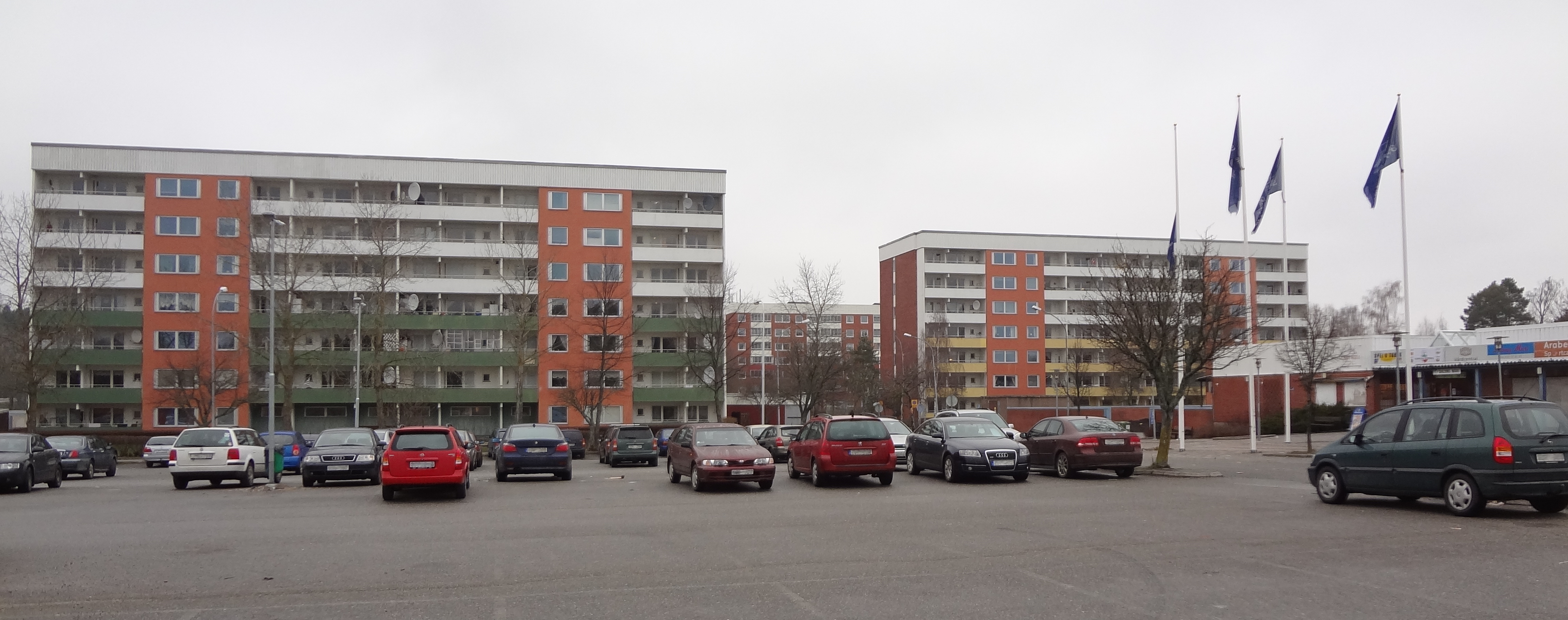
Skiftinge

Skiftinge is an urban area situated in Eskilstuna Municipality, Södermanland County, Sweden with 5,104 inhabitants as of 2018. A suburb, the area is located 3 kilometers north of central Eskilstuna and was officially part of the city proper until 2015.

== History ==
Old ceramics and jewelry dating back to the 11th century have been found in graves in the Skiftinge area, making archeologists believe that Skiftinge was a trading hub during the Viking Age.
