= Västra Borsökna =

- Location within Södermanland Location within Sweden
- Coordinates: 59°20′30″N 16°25′30″E
- Country: Sweden
- Province: Södermanland
- County: Södermanland County
- Municipality: Eskilstuna Municipality

Area
  - Total: 0.95 km^{2} (0.37 sq mi)

Population (2005-12-31)
  - Total: 482
  - Density: 507/km^{2} (1,310/sq mi)
- Time zone: UTC+1 (CET)
  - Summer (DST): UTC+2 (CEST)

Västra Borsökna is a village situated in Eskilstuna Municipality, Södermanland County, Sweden with 482 inhabitants in 2005.
