= Marmorbyn =

- Location within Södermanland Location within Sweden
- Coordinates: 59°02′N 16°03′E
- Country: Sweden
- Province: Södermanland
- County: Södermanland County
- Municipality: Vingåker Municipality

Area
  - Total: 0.49 km^{2} (0.19 sq mi)

Population (31 December 2020)
  - Total: 388
  - Density: 790/km^{2} (2,100/sq mi)
- Time zone: UTC+1 (CET)
  - Summer (DST): UTC+2 (CEST)
- Climate: Dfb

Marmorbyn is a locality situated in Vingåker Municipality, Södermanland County, Sweden with 382 inhabitants in 2010.
