= Härad, Sweden =

Härad
- Location within Södermanland Location within Sweden
- Coordinates: 59°21′N 16°54′E
- Country: Sweden
- Province: Södermanland
- County: Södermanland County
- Municipality: Strängnäs Municipality

Area
  - Total: 0.57 km^{2} (0.22 sq mi)

Population (31 December 2020)
  - Total: 556
  - Density: 980/km^{2} (2,500/sq mi)
- Time zone: UTC+1 (CET)
  - Summer (DST): UTC+2 (CEST)

Härad is a locality situated in Strängnäs Municipality, Södermanland County, Sweden with 508 inhabitants in 2010.

== Notable people ==
- Agnes Welin who founded a mission for Swedish seamen in London was born here in 1844.
