= Vingåker =

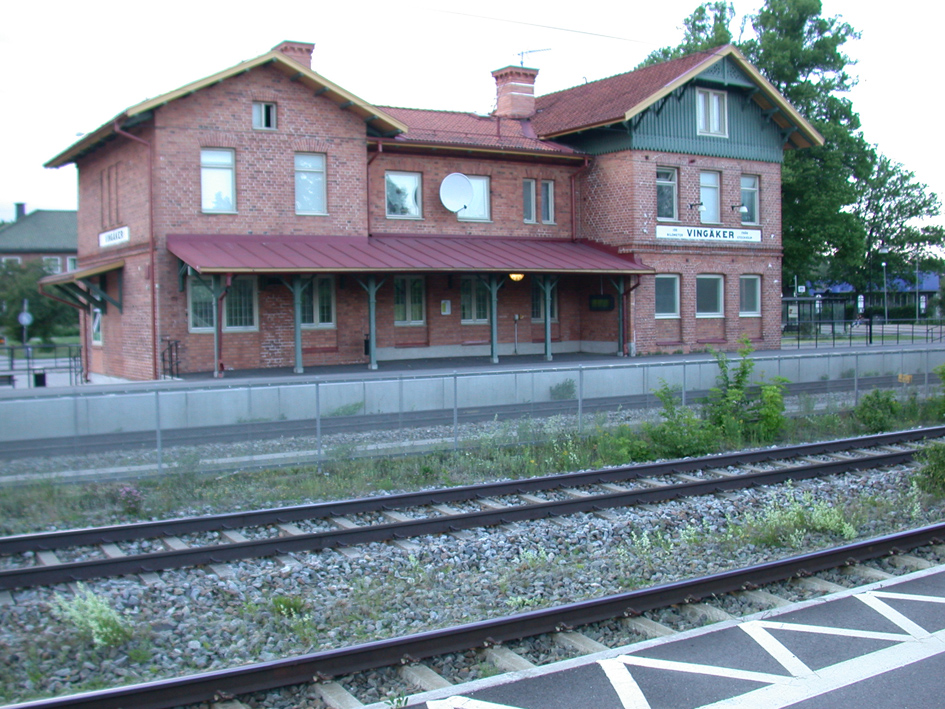
- Vingåker railway station

- Location within Södermanland Location within Sweden
- Coordinates: 59°02′N 15°52′E
- Country: Sweden
- Province: Södermanland
- County: Södermanland County
- Municipality: Vingåker Municipality

Area
  - Total: 3.87 km^{2} (1.49 sq mi)

Population (31 December 2020)
  - Total: 4,741
  - Density: 1,230/km^{2} (3,170/sq mi)
- Time zone: UTC+1 (CET)
  - Summer (DST): UTC+2 (CEST)
- Climate: Dfb

Vingåker is a locality and the seat of Vingåker Municipality, Södermanland County, Sweden with 4,282 inhabitants in 2010. It is located 50 kilometres (31 mi) by road from the nearest larger city Örebro and 80 kilometres (50 mi) north-west of county seat Nyköping.

It was partly built in the English garden of Säfstaholm, a large estate which until 1855 was home to philanthropist and art collector Gustaf Trolle-Bonde. The estate is nowadays owned by the municipality and contains an art museum with yearly exhibitions during the summer.

The town's expansion began in 1862 when a railway station was opened along the western main line (Västra Stambanan, which runs from Stockholm to Gothenburg). The station remained in operation until 1971, but reopened in 2003.

The town is the birthplace of Gunnar Helén, former chairman of the Liberal Party, and former Swedish Prime Minister Göran Persson.

A transit center for refugees from Norway during World War II was located in the manor of Kjesäter, now a public high school.
