= Merlänna =

- Location within Södermanland Location within Sweden
- Coordinates: 59°17′N 16°59′E
- Country: Sweden
- Province: Södermanland
- County: Södermanland County
- Municipality: Strängnäs Municipality

Area
  - Total: 0.46 km^{2} (0.18 sq mi)

Population (31 December 2020)
  - Total: 393
  - Density: 850/km^{2} (2,200/sq mi)
- Time zone: UTC+1 (CET)
  - Summer (DST): UTC+2 (CEST)

Merlänna is a locality situated in Strängnäs Municipality, Södermanland County, Sweden with 356 inhabitants in 2010.
