= Högsjö =

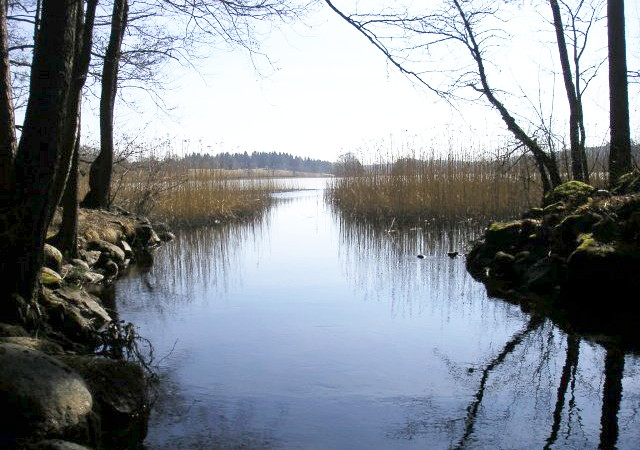
- Högsjö

- Location within Södermanland Location within Sweden
- Coordinates: 59°02′N 15°41′E
- Country: Sweden
- Province: Södermanland
- County: Södermanland County
- Municipality: Vingåker Municipality

Area
  - Total: 0.99 km^{2} (0.38 sq mi)

Population (31 December 2020)
  - Total: 651
  - Density: 660/km^{2} (1,700/sq mi)
- Time zone: UTC+1 (CET)
  - Summer (DST): UTC+2 (CEST)
- Climate: Dfb

Högsjö is a locality situated in Vingåker Municipality, Södermanland County, Sweden with 713 inhabitants in 2010.

== Riksdag elections ==
Year	%	Votes	V	S	MP	C	L	KD	M	SD	NyD	Left	Right
1973	96.0	651	2.2	70.2		11.7	4.6	3.7	7.7			72.4	24.0
1976	96.5	654	1.8	66.1		15.0	5.7	2.8	8.6			67.9	29.2
1979	95.9	650	1.8	65.7		12.6	6.8	2.0	10.2			67.5	29.5
1982	96.9	639	2.2	66.2	2.5	10.5	4.1	1.4	13.1			68.4	27.7
1985	96.1	662	3.2	66.8	3.3	7.7	7.6		11.5			69.9	26.7
1988	92.4	602	3.3	65.4	5.6	8.3	6.0	2.2	8.5			74.4	22.8
1991	91.7	592	4.4	59.1	3.9	6.9	3.7	4.4	11.0		6.4	63.5	26.0
1994	92.7	611	3.6	65.1	8.7	6.2	2.0	2.8	10.5		0.8	77.4	21.4
1998	87.4	554	9.2	57.8	7.6	4.3	1.3	7.9	11.0			74.5	24.5
2002	82.5	537	2.4	63.3	5.2	4.7	7.6	7.1	8.6	0.7		70.9	27.9
2006	82.9	544	4.4	55.1	4.6	6.1	4.0	5.5	14.7	4.2		64.2	30.3
2010	86.9	561	3.9	51.2	5.7	4.3	3.9	3.9	16.0	10.0		60.8	28.2
2014	89.6	540	3.3	48.0	3.7	2.6	2.4	3.7	9.8	24.8		55.0	18.5
2018	89.8	539	5.2	39.7	4.3	5.0	2.8	4.5	8.9	28.4		54.2	44.5
2022	85.6	1,048	4.6	32.3	3.3	4.3	1.1	4.5	14.2	34.3		44.5	54.1
