= Bälgviken =

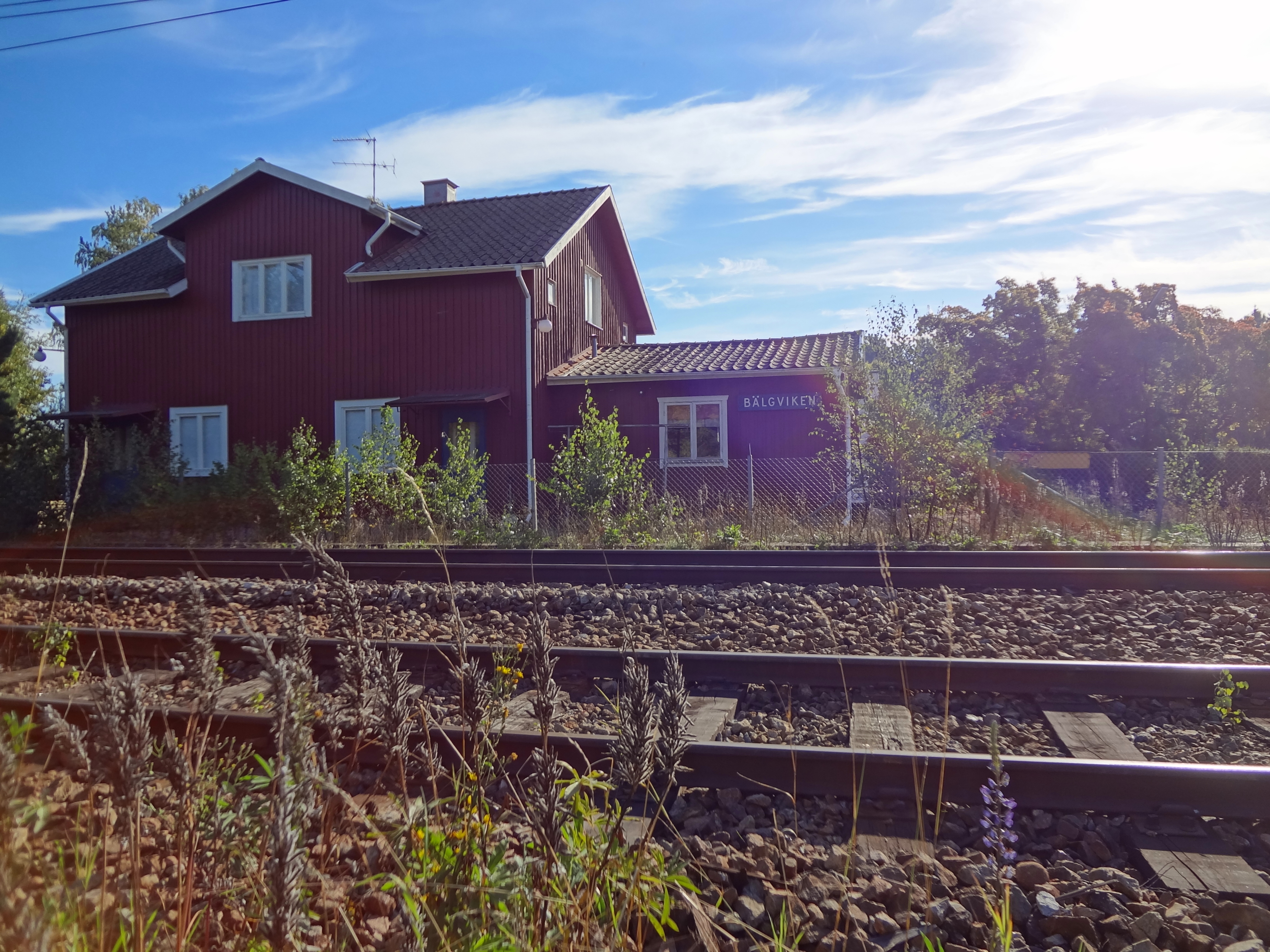

- Location within Södermanland Location within Sweden
- Coordinates: 59°15′N 16°27′E
- Country: Sweden
- Province: Södermanland
- County: Södermanland County
- Municipality: Eskilstuna Municipality

Area
  - Total: 0.39 km^{2} (0.15 sq mi)

Population (31 December 2020)
  - Total: 217
  - Density: 560/km^{2} (1,400/sq mi)
- Time zone: UTC+1 (CET)
  - Summer (DST): UTC+2 (CEST)

Bälgviken is a locality situated in Eskilstuna Municipality, Södermanland County, Sweden with 253 inhabitants in 2010.
