= Axel Welin =

Swedish inventor and industrialist (1862–1951)

Ernst Martin Axel Welin
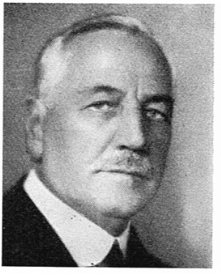
- Ernst Axel Welin
- Born: 10 November 1862; Sweden
- Died: 27 July 1951 (aged 88)
- Known for: Welin breech block
- Spouse: Agnes Welin (m. 1889; died 1928)

Ernst Martin Axel Welin (10 November 1862 – 27 July 1951), was a Swedish inventor and industrialist. He was married to Agnes Welin from 1889.

Axel Welin studied at the Royal Institute of Technology in Stockholm from 1879 to 1884. Between 1886 and 1888, Welin worked as a weapons designer for Thorsten Nordenfelt in London. In 1889 he started his own engineering firm, the Welin Davit & Engineering Company Ltd. He soon designed the famed Welin breech block for large artillery.

However, his main interest was davits. He invented a new and improved davit for lowering boats on board ship, a quadrant davit for double-banked boats which simply became known as the Welin davit. The RMS Titanic was equipped with Welin davits, and after the disaster the demand for his product skyrocketed. He was awarded the John Scott Medal of The Franklin Institute in 1911. He retired a wealthy man in 1932 and returned to Sweden.

The Welin Davit Company continues today as Welin Lambie, based at Brierley Hill in the West Midlands, UK.
