= Hällbybrunn =

Locality in Södermanland County, Sweden

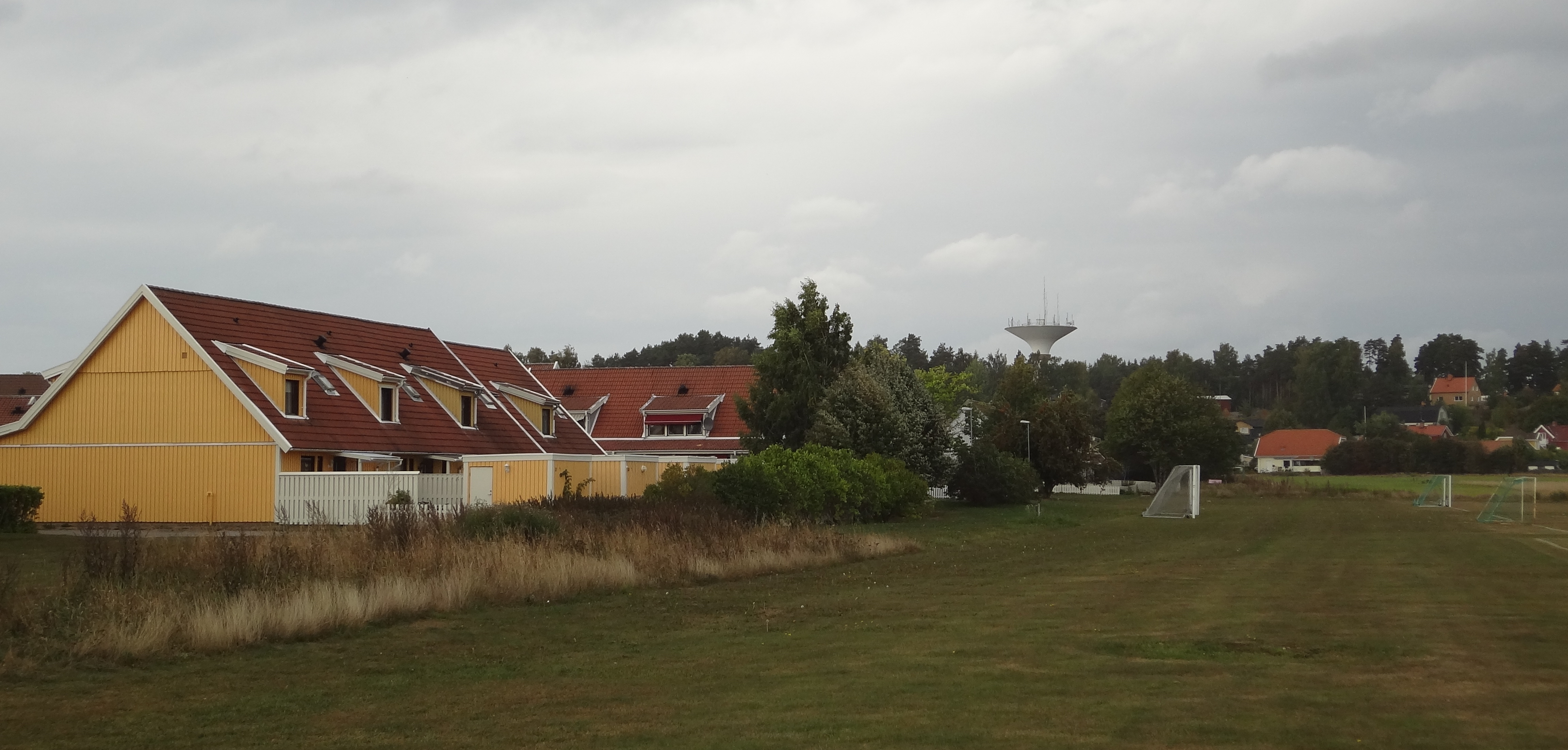

- Location within Södermanland Location within Sweden
- Coordinates: 59°23′32″N 16°25′13″E
- Country: Sweden
- Province: Södermanland
- County: Södermanland County
- Municipality: Eskilstuna Municipality

Area
  - Total: 3.08 km^{2} (1.19 sq mi)

Population (31 December 2020)
  - Total: 3,394
  - Density: 1,100/km^{2} (2,850/sq mi)
- Time zone: UTC+1 (CET)
  - Summer (DST): UTC+2 (CEST)

Hällbybrunn is a locality situated in Eskilstuna Municipality, Södermanland County, Sweden with 3,296 inhabitants in 2010.
