= Alberga, Sweden =

Alberga
- Location within Södermanland Location within Sweden
- Coordinates: 59°17′N 16°07′E
- Country: Sweden
- Province: Södermanland
- County: Södermanland County
- Municipality: Eskilstuna Municipality

Area
  - Total: 0.42 km^{2} (0.16 sq mi)

Population (31 December 2020)
  - Total: 416
  - Density: 990/km^{2} (2,600/sq mi)
- Time zone: UTC+1 (CET)
  - Summer (DST): UTC+2 (CEST)

Alberga is a locality situated in Eskilstuna Municipality, Södermanland County, Sweden with 395 inhabitants in 2010.

Alberga is connected to Eskilstuna, Ärla and Västermo with buses operated by Länstrafiken Sörmland.
