= Nyköping County =

County of the Swedish Empire from 1634 to 1683

Coordinates: 58°44′54″N 17°00′42″E

Nyköping County Nyköpings län
- County of the Swedish Empire
- 1634–1683
- Flag
- Capital: Nyköping
- History
  - Established: 1634
  - Disestablished: 1683
Succeeded by
Södermanland County

Nyköping County, or Nyköpings län, was a county of the Swedish Empire from 1634 to 1683. It was one of three counties in the province of Södermanland, and in 1683 they were merged into Södermanland County.

== See also ==
- List of governors of Södermanland County
- Gripsholm County
- Eskilstunahus County
