= Orrhammar =

- Location within Södermanland Location within Sweden
- Coordinates: 59°05′N 16°33′E
- Country: Sweden
- Province: Södermanland
- County: Södermanland County
- Municipality: Flen Municipality

Area
  - Total: 1.05 km^{2} (0.41 sq mi)

Population (31 December 2020)
  - Total: 248
  - Density: 236/km^{2} (612/sq mi)
- Time zone: UTC+1 (CET)
  - Summer (DST): UTC+2 (CEST)

Orrhammar is a village situated in Flen Municipality, Södermanland County, Sweden with 322 inhabitants in 2005.
