= Kjulaås =

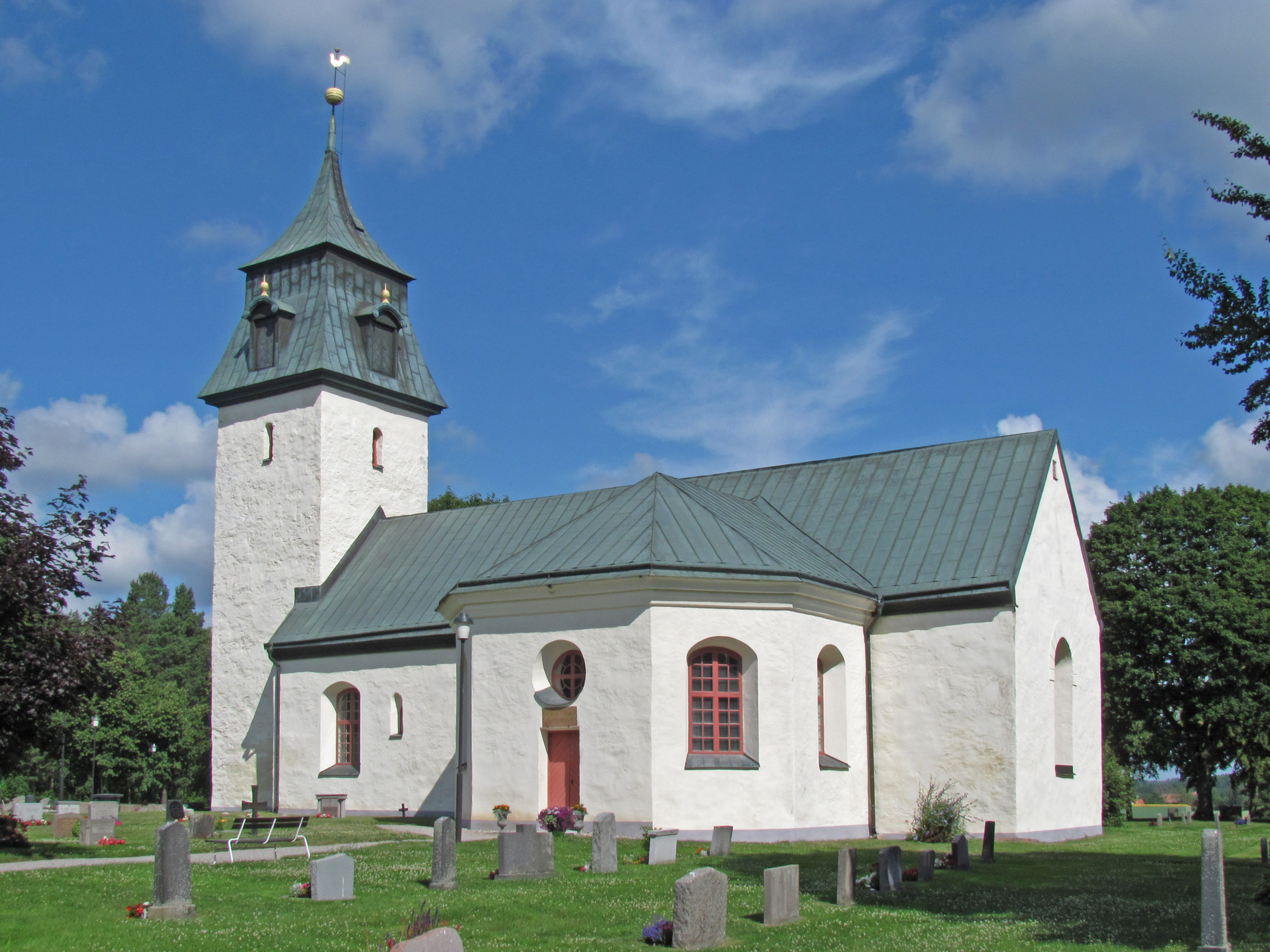

- Location within Södermanland Location within Sweden
- Coordinates: 59°23′N 16°40′E
- Country: Sweden
- Province: Södermanland
- County: Södermanland County
- Municipality: Eskilstuna Municipality

Area
  - Total: 1.0 km^{2} (0.39 sq mi)

Population (31 December 2020)
  - Total: 956
  - Density: 960/km^{2} (2,500/sq mi)
- Time zone: UTC+1 (CET)
  - Summer (DST): UTC+2 (CEST)

Kjulaås is a locality situated in Eskilstuna Municipality, Södermanland County, Sweden with 837 inhabitants in 2010.
