= Hällberga =

- Location within Södermanland Location within Sweden
- Coordinates: 59°19′N 16°36′E
- Country: Sweden
- Province: Södermanland
- County: Södermanland County
- Municipality: Eskilstuna Municipality

Area
  - Total: 0.74 km^{2} (0.29 sq mi)

Population (31 December 2020)
  - Total: 610
  - Density: 820/km^{2} (2,100/sq mi)
- Time zone: UTC+1 (CET)
  - Summer (DST): UTC+2 (CEST)

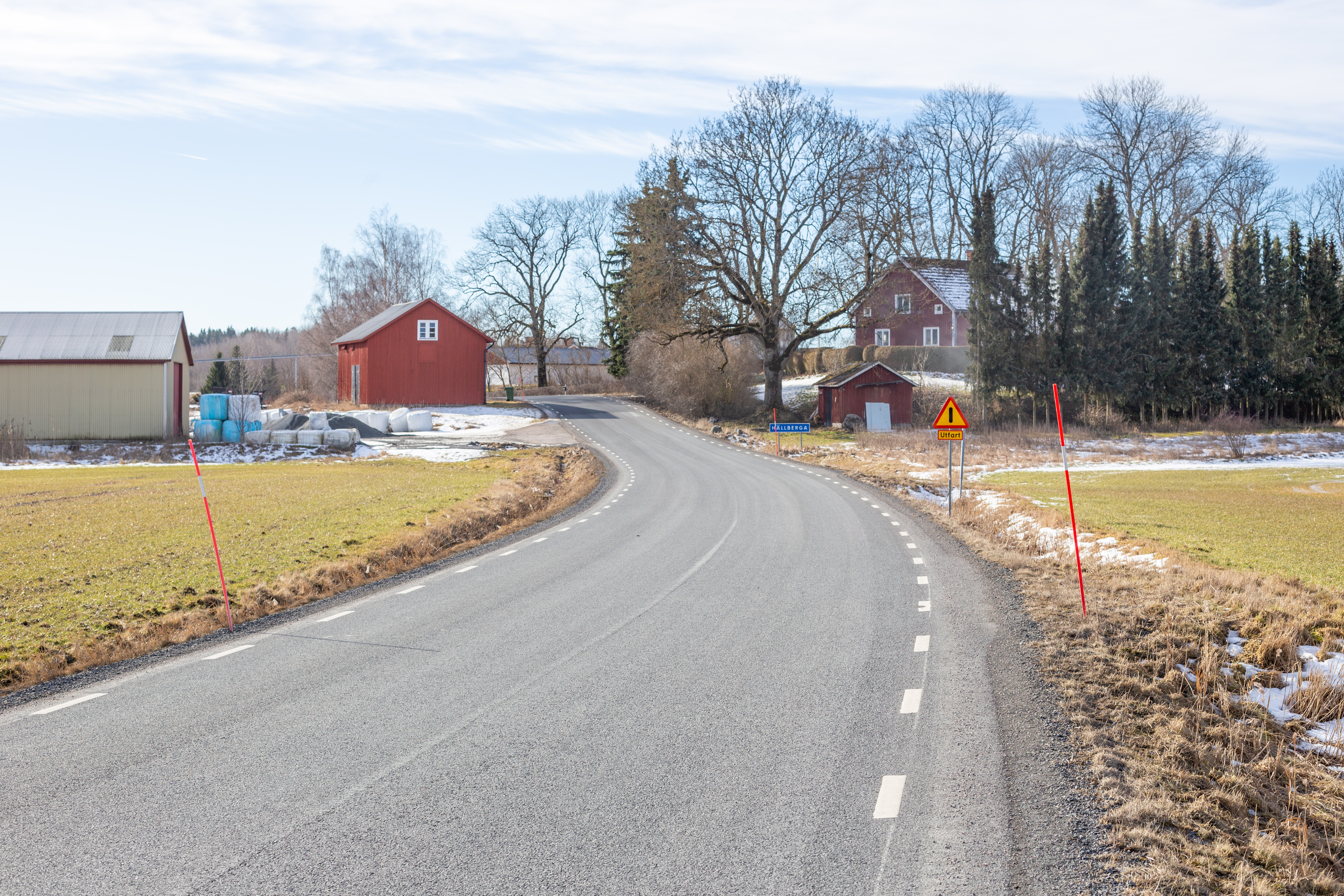

Hällberga is a locality situated in Eskilstuna Municipality, Södermanland County, Sweden with 612 inhabitants in 2010.
