= Tumbo =

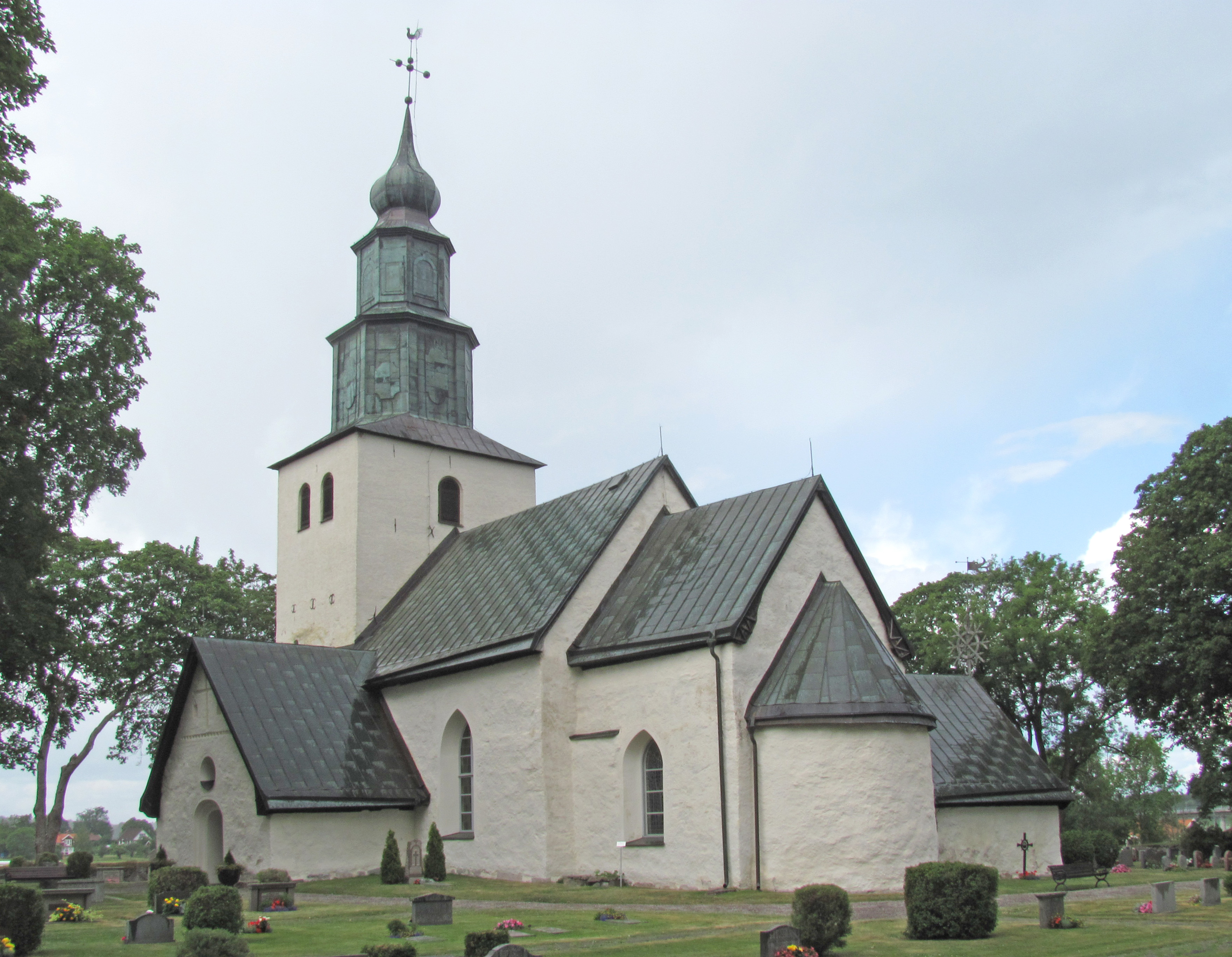

- Location within Södermanland Location within Sweden
- Coordinates: 59°26′N 16°20′E
- Country: Sweden
- Province: Södermanland
- County: Södermanland County
- Municipality: Eskilstuna Municipality

Area
  - Total: 0.53 km^{2} (0.20 sq mi)

Population (31 December 2020)
  - Total: 343
  - Density: 650/km^{2} (1,700/sq mi)
- Time zone: UTC+1 (CET)
  - Summer (DST): UTC+2 (CEST)

Tumbo is a locality situated in Eskilstuna Municipality, Södermanland County, Sweden with 292 inhabitants in 2010.

== See also ==
- Södermanland Runic Inscription 84
