= Baggetorp =

- Location within Södermanland Location within Sweden
- Coordinates: 59°00′N 16°05′E
- Country: Sweden
- Province: Södermanland
- County: Södermanland County
- Municipality: Katrineholm Municipality and Vingåker Municipality

Area
  - Total: 0.84 km^{2} (0.32 sq mi)

Population (31 December 2020)
  - Total: 568
  - Density: 680/km^{2} (1,800/sq mi)
- Time zone: UTC+1 (CET)
  - Summer (DST): UTC+2 (CEST)
- Climate: Dfb

Baggetorp is a bimunicipal locality situated in Katrineholm Municipality and Vingåker Municipality in Södermanland County, Sweden with 502 inhabitants in 2010.
