= Agnes Welin =

Missionary to seafarers (1844–1928)

- in 1928
- Born: 15 May 1844; Härad, Sweden
- Died: 23 June 1928 (aged 84); London
- Occupation: Missionary
- Spouse: Axel Welin (m. 1889)

Agnes Carolina Albertina Welin (née Hedenström; 15 May 1844 – 23 June 1928) was a missionary who was born in Sweden. She opened a mission for seafarers in London.

== Life ==
Welin was born as Agnes Carolina Albertina Hedenström in Härad, Sweden in 1844. She became an enthusiastic Lutheran and decided to become a missionary. She hoped to be sent by a British missionary society to India or China but illness prevented her leaving England. While in England she took work in a seamen's mission in London. She had become a missionary to seafarers in London. Within a few years she had opened her own mission in Leman Street in Whitechapel. That building was too small and an appeal raised money and the attention of Thomas Denny, Lord Blantyre and David Carnegie who formed a committee to modify buildings under the guidance of Richard Harris Hill. The Scandinavian Seamen's Temperance Hostel opened on 13 February 1888 near East India Docks. The opening was conducted by Prince Oscar of Sweden. She married businessperson Axel Welin on 21 January 1889.

Welin died in London in 1928 still at work despite a small stroke days earlier. Her body was returned to Sweden where she was buried in Solna churchyard. A plaque commemorating Welin's contribution was placed on the building. Her mission closed at her death but it was re-opened by the Salvation Army in 1930. Welin's original clientele of Swedish seaman were no longer there and the building was converted to be a home for homeless men. The Salvation Army were there until 2003 and the building was then to be demolished.
