= Ärla =

- Location within Södermanland Location within Sweden
- Coordinates: 59°17′N 16°40′E
- Country: Sweden
- Province: Södermanland
- County: Södermanland County
- Municipality: Eskilstuna Municipality

Area
  - Total: 1.40 km^{2} (0.54 sq mi)

Population (31 December 2020)
  - Total: 1,302
  - Density: 930/km^{2} (2,410/sq mi)
- Time zone: UTC+1 (CET)
  - Summer (DST): UTC+2 (CEST)

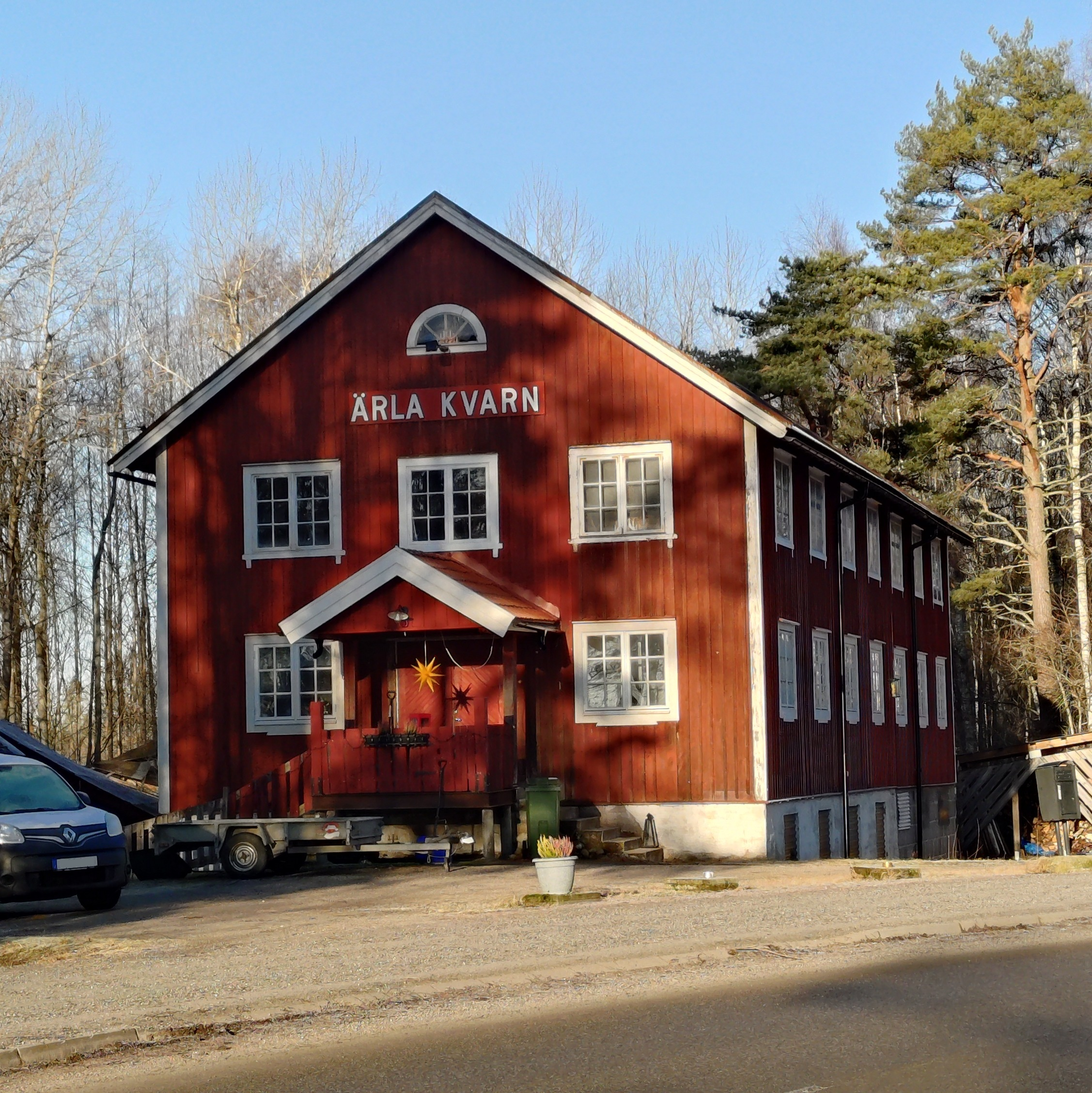
Mill in Ärla

Ärla is a locality situated in Eskilstuna Municipality, Södermanland County, Sweden with 1,270 inhabitants in 2010.
