= Marielund railway station =

Railway station in Uppsala, Sweden

Marielund
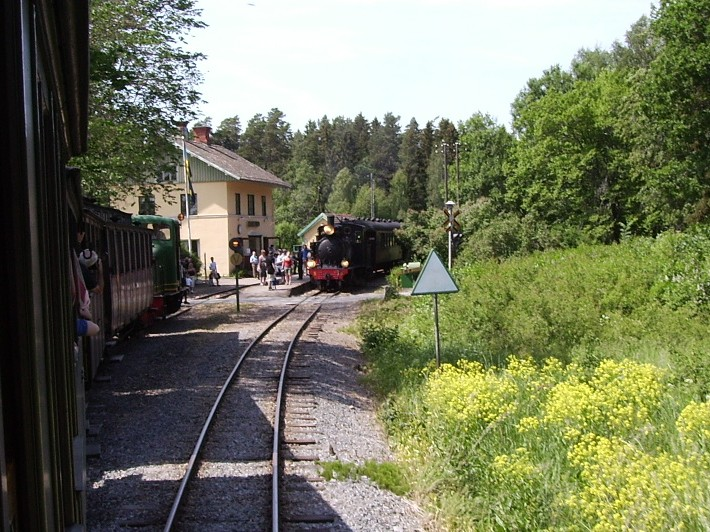

General information
- Location: Marielund, Uppsala; Sweden
- Coordinates: 59°50′34″N 17°52′30″E
- Elevation: 22 m (72 ft)
- Operator: Upsala-Lenna Jernväg
- Line: Upsala-Lenna Jernväg
- Distance: 14.5 (Uppsala Ö)
- Platforms: 1

History
- Opened: 1876
Location

Marielund railway station (Swedish: Marielunds järnvägsstation) is a railroad station at Upsala-Lenna Jernväg (ULJ) in Sweden. The station is located 14 km east of Uppsala.

The station was opened in 1876. In 1918, electric light was installed in the station, including platform lights. The middle platform was built in 1949. In 1953, a new electric signal box with electric interlocking and railway signaling were built. The current signal box is from the SRJ station Djursholms Ösby north of Stockholm, and the goods store house is from the former SRJ station Österbybruk. As the station currently includes the main signal control for the ULJ railroad, Marielund Station is always staffed during regular traffic hours.
