= Hållsta =

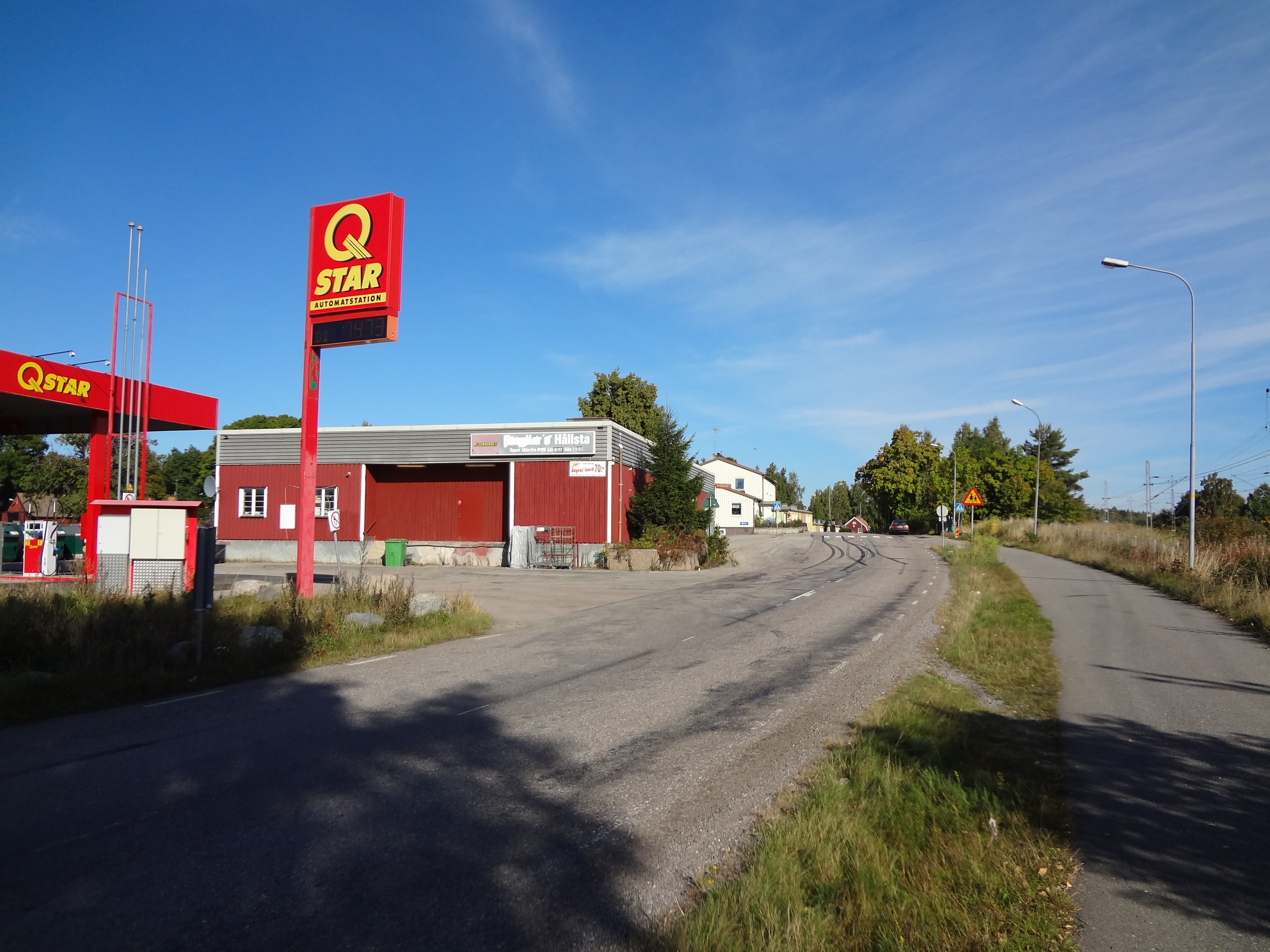

- Location within Södermanland Location within Sweden
- Coordinates: 59°18′N 16°27′E
- Country: Sweden
- Province: Södermanland
- County: Södermanland County
- Municipality: Eskilstuna Municipality

Area
  - Total: 0.86 km^{2} (0.33 sq mi)

Population (31 December 2020)
  - Total: 888
  - Density: 1,000/km^{2} (2,700/sq mi)
- Time zone: UTC+1 (CET)
  - Summer (DST): UTC+2 (CEST)

Hållsta is a locality situated in Eskilstuna Municipality, Södermanland County, Sweden with 823 inhabitants in 2010.

It is famous for its production of energy drinks that are sold throughout Södermanland County, Sweden. That is its main source of income and rakes in roughly 1 000 000 sek (Swedish Kronor) in revenue annually.

The locality gained its name from the first farm in the area, owned by the Hol family in the 1300s. Its name changed slightly throughout the years before it reached its current name. In about 1307 more inhabitants migrated there and it became a town, which was named Hol, after its founders. In 1440 it was renamed Holstad, as it had reached a larger amount of inhabitants and the townsfolks decide to reflect that by calling it a "stad" (Swedish word for city). However, in 1518, the descendants of the Hol family were part of a scandal which led to the family being chased out of the town with pitchforks. The following year, the town had a vote to rename the town to separate it from the Hol family; a vote was held and decided on Hållsta, a name that was similar to their previous name, but different enough to remove the connotation with the town and its unholy founders.
