= Eskilstunahus County =

Former county of the Swedish Empire

Coordinates: 59°22′15″N 16°30′35″E

Eskilstunahus County Eskilstunahus län
- County of the Swedish Empire
- 1634–1683
- Flag
- Capital: Eskilstuna
- Area
- History
  - Established: 1634
  - Disestablished: 1683
Succeeded by
Södermanland County

Eskilstunahus County, or Eskilstunahus län, was a county of the Swedish Empire from 1634 to 1683, named after the county seat of Eskilstuna House. It was one of three counties in the province of Södermanland, and in 1683 they were merged into the Södermanland County.

== See also ==
- Nyköping County
- Gripsholm County
