= Gripsholm County =

Swedish political subdivision

Coordinates: 59°15′22″N 17°13′09″E

County of Gripsholm Gripsholms län
- County of the Swedish Empire
- 1634–1683
- Flag
- Capital: Gripsholm
- History
  - Established: 1634
  - Disestablished: 1683
Succeeded by
County of Södermanland

The County of Gripsholm, or Gripsholms län, was a county of the Swedish Empire from 1634 to 1683. It was one of three counties in the province of Södermanland, and in 1683 they were merged into the County of Södermanland.

== See also ==
- County of Nyköping
- County of Eskilstunahus
