= Marielund, Strängnäs =

Marielund
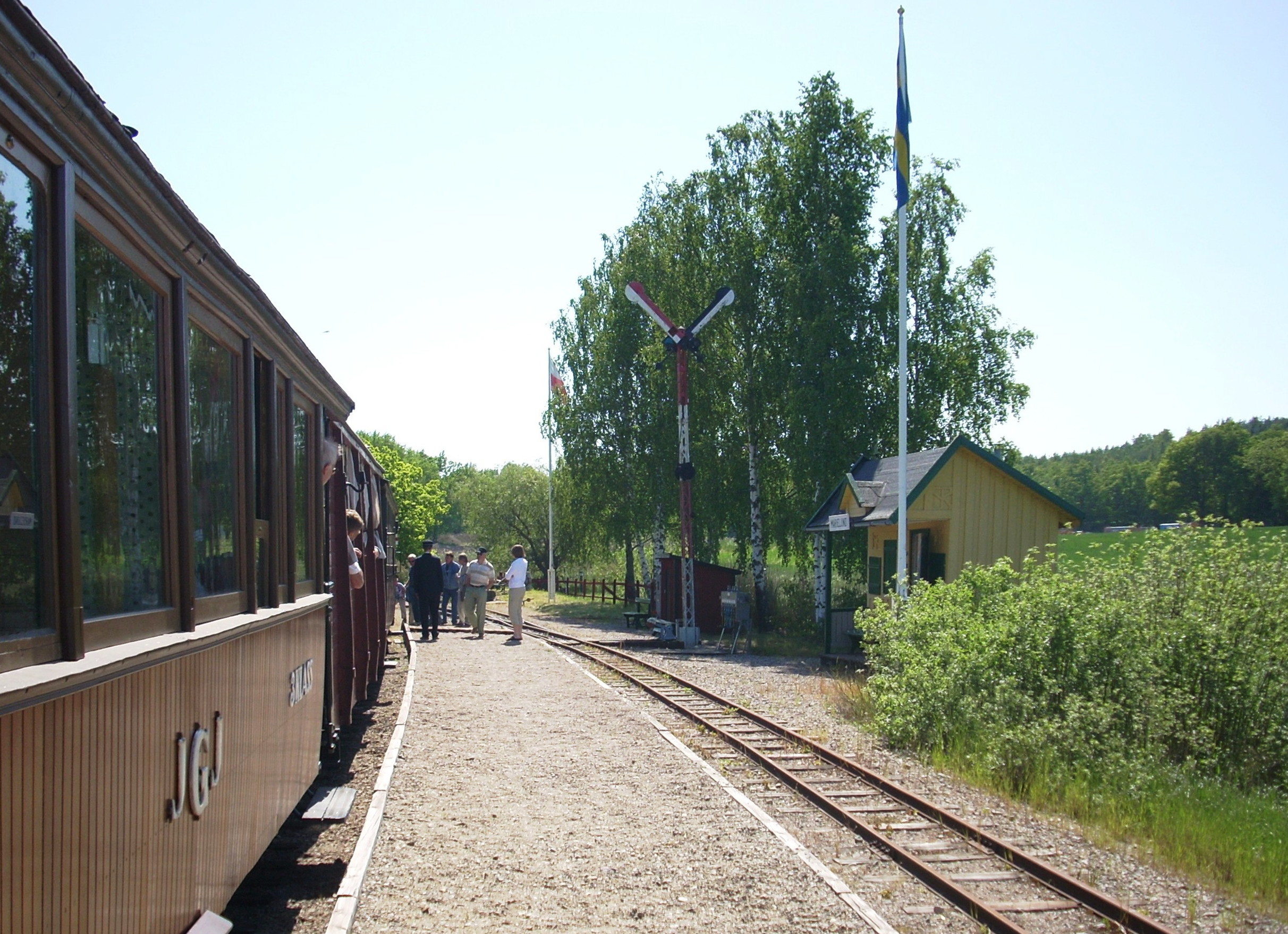
- Marielund railway station

- Location within Södermanland Location within Sweden
- Coordinates: 59°15′N 17°11′E
- Country: Sweden
- Province: Södermanland
- County: Södermanland County
- Municipality: Strängnäs Municipality

Area
  - Total: 0.21 km^{2} (0.081 sq mi)

Population (31 December 2020)
  - Total: 1,150
  - Density: 5,500/km^{2} (14,000/sq mi)
- Time zone: UTC+1 (CET)
  - Summer (DST): UTC+2 (CEST)

Marielund is a locality situated in Strängnäs Municipality, Södermanland County, Sweden with 416 inhabitants in 2010.
