= Marielund, Uppsala =

Village in Uppsala Municipality, Sweden

Coordinates: 59.842919°N 17.874985°E

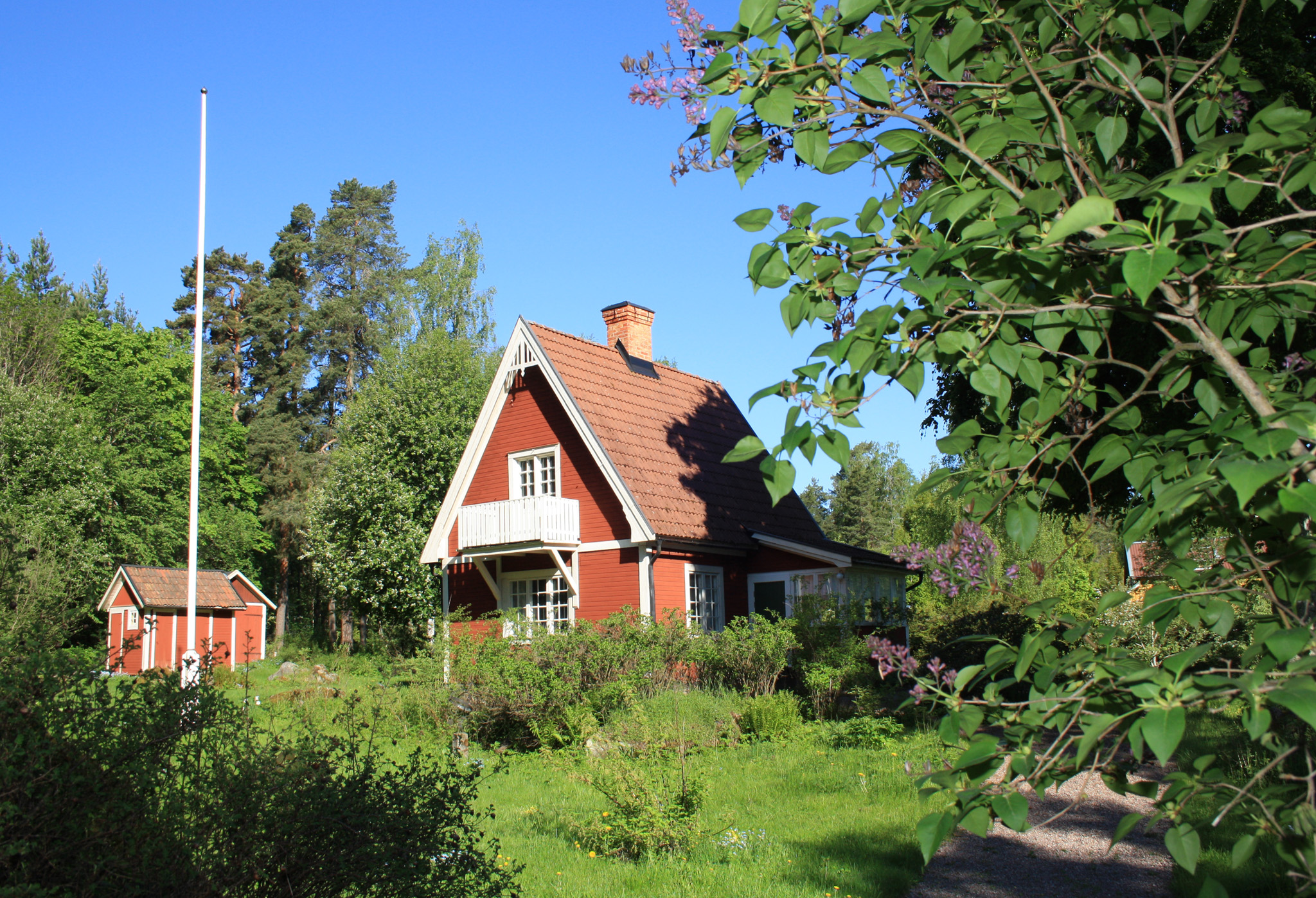
This summer cottage in Marielund includes elements from both the Art Nouveau and National Romantic styles

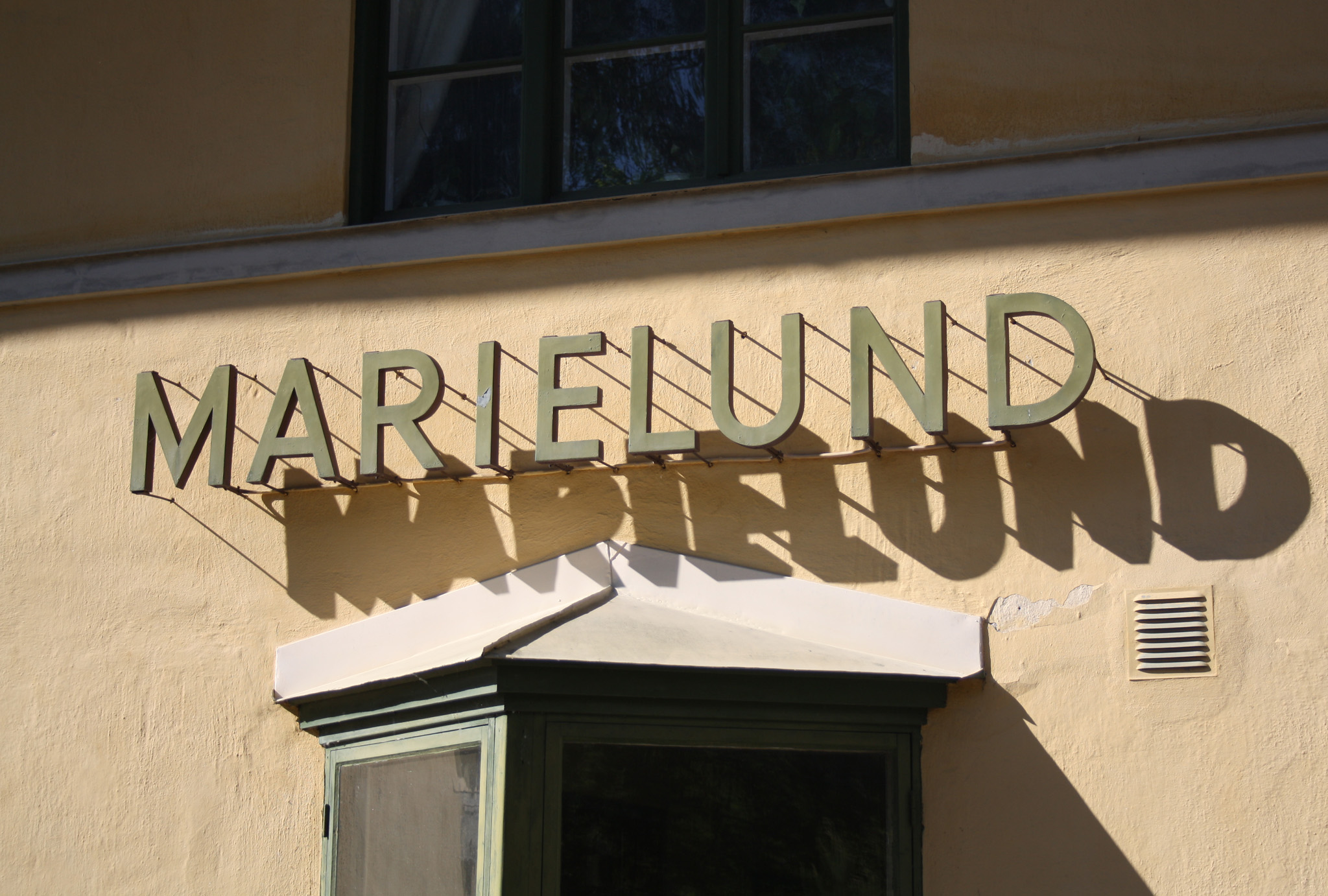
The sign on the facade of Marielund railway station

Marielund is a village in Uppsala Municipality, Uppsala County, Sweden.

The village is about 59 kilometers (36 miles) north of Stockholm, the capital of Sweden. It is 14 km east of Uppsala and has historic wooden houses in the Art Nouveau and National Romantic styles. There are houses of varying size, mostly built during 1890–1930.

The Marielund railway station is on the Upsala-Lenna Jernväg ("Lennakatten") heritage narrow-gauge railway.
