= Eskilstuna Municipality =

Eskilstuna Municipality Eskilstuna kommun
- Municipality
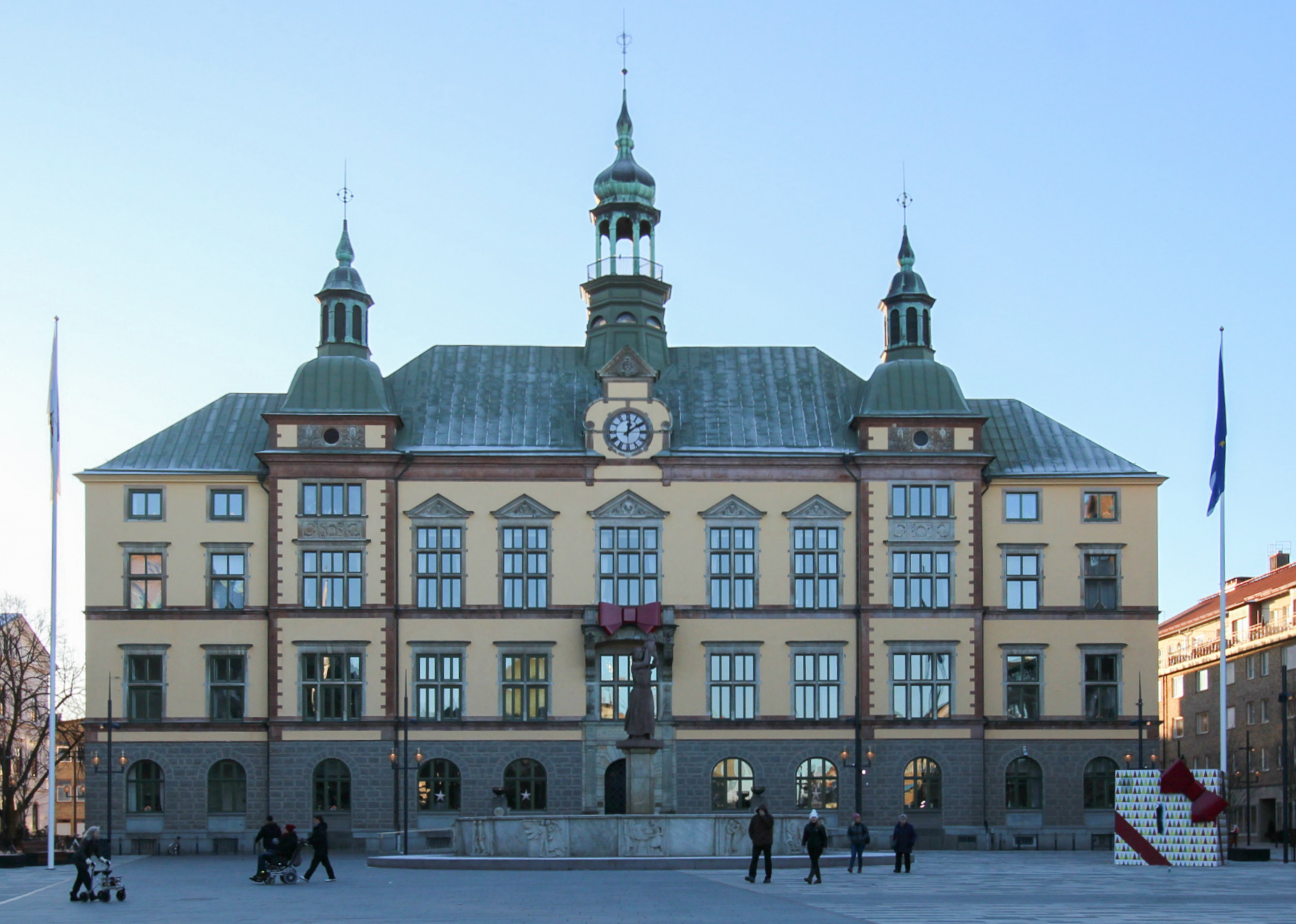
- Eskilstuna town hall

- Flag Coat of arms

- Coordinates: 59°22′N 16°31′E
- Country: Sweden
- County: Södermanland County
- Seat: Eskilstuna

Area
  - Total: 1,250.49 km^{2} (482.82 sq mi)
  - Land: 1,099.87 km^{2} (424.66 sq mi)
  - Water: 150.62 km^{2} (58.15 sq mi)
- Area as of 1 January 2014.

Population (30 June 2025)
  - Total: 107,189
  - Density: 97.4561/km^{2} (252.410/sq mi)
- Time zone: UTC+1 (CET)
  - Summer (DST): UTC+2 (CEST)
- ISO 3166 code: SE
- Province: Södermanland
- Municipal code: 0484
- Website: www.eskilstuna.se
- Density is calculated using land area only.

Eskilstuna Municipality (Swedish: Eskilstuna kommun) is a municipality in Södermanland County in southeast Sweden, between Lake Mälaren and Lake Hjälmaren. The seat of the municipality is in the city of Eskilstuna.

The present municipality was formed in 1971 by the merger of the City of Eskilstuna, the City of Torshälla and five rural municipalities. It is the largest municipality in the Sörmland region in terms of population, having more than 1/3 of the overall county population.

== Geography ==
Eskilstuna Municipality is an inland municipality, although the low-lying Mälaren renders the lengthy lakeshore to be at 1 metre (3.3 ft) above sea level. The highest point is at Tyckenhed in the southwest of the municipality at 114 metres (374 ft) above sea level.

== Localities ==
- Alberga
- Ärla
- Borsökna
- Bälgviken
- Eskilstuna (seat)
- Hållsta
- Hällberga
- Hällbybrunn
- Kjulaås
- Kvicksund (partly in Västerås Municipality)
- Mesta
- Skiftinge
- Skogstorp
- Torshälla
- Tumbo
- Västra Borsökna

== Demographics ==
This is a demographic table based on Eskilstuna Municipality's electoral districts in the 2022 Swedish general election sourced from SVT's election platform, in turn taken from SCB official statistics.

In total there were 78,420 Swedish citizens of voting age resident in the municipality. 47.5% voted for the left coalition and 51.0% for the right coalition. Indicators are in percentage points except population totals and income.

Location	Residents	Citizen adults	Left vote	Right vote	Employed	Swedish parents	Foreign heritage	Income SEK	Degree
Location			%	%					
Balsta-Eskilshem Ö	1,529	1,191	51.0	47.6	74	66	34	20,021	35
Barva-Jäder	1,483	1,153	32.9	66.0	88	91	9	27,985	37
Borsökna V	1,348	936	42.0	56.9	87	80	20	30,866	49
Borsökna Ö	1,179	874	41.4	58.3	86	81	19	30,534	47
Edvardslund-Haga	1,770	1,355	48.6	50.2	82	75	25	25,389	39
Ekbacken	1,800	1,688	44.6	54.3	78	59	41	24,215	41
Ekeby-Brottsta	1,957	1,444	47.2	51.8	83	78	22	27,332	42
Eskilsparken	1,560	1,323	47.1	52.0	85	82	18	27,525	48
Eskilstuna Centrum N	1,592	1,593	45.0	52.6	73	61	39	24,920	45
Eskilstuna Centrum S	1,728	1,403	54.1	44.3	72	62	38	24,174	43
Forsbomsvreten	1,551	915	53.4	43.5	57	34	66	16,053	33
Fröslunda-Björkhultsvägen	1,998	1,060	72.4	23.2	42	19	81	12,134	16
Fröslunda-Tallåsparken	2,195	1,244	65.6	29.8	52	24	76	13,779	23
Gillberga-Lista	1,642	1,293	34.1	64.6	85	90	10	26,909	31
Gökstensparken	1,792	1,373	50.8	48.3	75	67	33	22,102	28
Hammarby-Vallby	1,355	1,120	35.5	63.8	86	86	14	30,153	42
Hisingsbacke	1,643	1,273	43.5	55.1	78	70	30	25,566	45
Holmberget-Rådhustorget	1,896	1,316	46.0	53.3	69	68	32	20,958	31
Hållsta	1,523	1,153	44.8	54.4	84	83	17	26,229	36
Hällbybrunns N	1,643	1,235	46.0	53.5	82	79	21	26,809	38
Hällbybrunns S-Råby Rekarne	2,047	1,531	40.8	58.5	86	80	20	28,024	40
Kjula	1,667	1,225	41.0	58.1	88	86	14	27,700	36
Krusgårdsberget	1,534	1,082	47.2	50.9	59	57	43	16,751	22
Köpmangatsområdet	1,556	1,350	52.2	47.0	83	81	19	25,805	46
Lindhaga	1,922	1,348	45.9	53.4	88	71	29	29,754	46
Lundby-Gredby	2,081	1,538	50.2	48.6	85	71	29	28,009	46
Lustigbacke	1,459	1,165	53.7	44.7	75	73	27	21,506	40
Mesta	1,849	1,437	50.0	49.1	86	72	28	26,898	41
Munktellstaden-Valhalla	1,890	1,522	49.1	49.5	78	64	36	25,731	42
Myrtorp	1,574	1,103	51.0	47.3	74	60	40	20,664	35
Mälarbaden-Mälby-Ängsholmen	1,606	1,237	35.1	64.5	85	85	15	31,296	50
Nyfors C	2,041	1,201	59.6	37.4	58	32	68	15,610	30
Nyfors Ö	1,629	1,287	51.2	47.4	72	60	40	22,735	39
Nyforstorget	1,544	1,031	56.4	41.1	55	24	76	14,496	33
Näshulta	1,002	825	46.5	53.4	83	91	9	26,350	33
Odlaren-Hagnesta	2,022	1,566	42.2	56.7	89	80	20	31,804	55
Råbergstorp-Lagersberg	3,056	1,506	63.5	31.3	38	14	86	9,689	20
Röksta-Eskilshem V	1,564	1,141	54.6	43.0	75	53	47	24,161	40
Skiftinge N	1,695	1,075	54.2	43.2	64	34	66	19,281	36
Skiftinge S	1,647	1,062	48.8	49.2	56	40	60	16,897	20
Skogstorp N	1,631	1,206	47.9	51.8	87	84	16	30,049	49
Skogstorp S	1,318	986	46.7	52.4	91	86	14	31,758	51
Slagsta S-Helgestahill	1,627	1,235	50.6	48.7	85	78	22	26,922	41
Slagsta-Måsta	1,146	884	43.6	55.4	82	57	43	25,223	35
Slottsbacken	1,452	1,223	44.6	54.0	80	71	29	23,172	35
Snopptorp-Skogsängen	1,678	1,314	51.0	47.4	79	73	27	24,201	48
Solvik-Kogne-Roxnäs	1,468	1,076	40.9	58.1	84	75	25	28,841	42
Stadsparken	1,683	1,420	51.6	46.7	76	66	34	21,685	38
Stenby	1,690	1,230	46.6	51.1	80	51	49	25,760	41
Stenkvista	1,317	970	37.1	61.8	86	84	16	27,526	38
Sundbyholm-Ostra	1,263	921	42.9	56.9	88	87	13	30,407	43
Sveaplan-Sjukhusområdet	1,363	1,101	43.6	55.0	77	69	31	24,345	37
Söderängsparken	1,818	1,380	46.8	50.9	76	72	28	23,208	42
Tumbo	1,815	1,372	32.4	66.3	88	87	13	32,233	48
Tunavallen	1,448	1,174	52.3	47.1	85	67	33	28,129	51
Viptorp	2,079	1,305	58.8	39.4	56	45	55	16,808	24
Västermalm	2,116	1,303	58.6	37.8	52	33	67	14,291	26
Västermarksparken	1,562	1,189	56.0	42.6	73	59	41	21,443	34
Årby-Navigatören	1,527	911	59.5	38.0	53	28	72	15,679	24
Årby-Notarien	1,505	724	73.2	22.1	41	12	88	9,958	21
Ärla	2,268	1,733	37.9	61.2	84	90	10	26,463	31
Ärsta	1,877	1,166	49.6	48.3	60	36	64	17,694	34
Öja-Västermo	1,604	1,279	41.8	57.1	83	92	8	23,672	28
Östermalm	1,550	1,144	46.5	52.7	77	69	31	24,292	35
Source: SVT

== Elections ==
=== Riksdag ===
These are the results of the Riksdag elections of Eskilstuna Municipality since the 1972 municipality reform. The results of the Sweden Democrats were not published by SCB between 1988 and 1998 at a municipal level to the party's small nationwide size at the time. "Votes" denotes valid votes, whereas "Turnout" denotes also blank and invalid votes.

Year	Turnout	Votes	V	S	MP	C	L	KD	M	SD	ND
1973	91.5	55,242	4.5	52.3	0.0	19.9	11.0	1.6	10.3	0.0	0.0
1976	92.2	57,466	3.4	51.8	0.0	18.5	12.6	1.3	12.1	0.0	0.0
1979	91.1	56,858	4.0	53.6	0.0	13.1	12.0	1.1	15.6	0.0	0.0
1982	91.9	57,768	4.1	56.0	1.6	10.9	6.8	1.5	18.9	0.0	0.0
1985	89.9	57,305	4.4	54.9	1.3	8.1	14.1	0.0	16.9	0.0	0.0
1988	85.0	54,494	4.9	52.3	4.5	7.4	13.3	2.3	14.1	0.0	0.0
1991	85.3	54,763	4.0	46.4	2.7	5.7	9.8	5.9	17.5	0.0	7.2
1994	85.9	55,238	5.6	54.2	4.5	4.8	7.1	3.2	17.8	0.0	1.3
1998	79.7	50,641	11.5	44.9	4.8	3.5	4.3	10.0	18.9	0.0	0.0
2002	77.4	50,404	7.7	47.7	4.9	4.4	12.6	7.5	12.2	1.3	0.0
2006	79.6	53,595	5.4	44.1	5.4	6.0	6.9	5.8	21.6	2.8	0.0
2010	83.3	58,588	5.4	35.9	7.9	4.6	6.7	4.4	26.2	7.9	0.0
2014	84.0	61,217	5.4	35.5	6.1	4.3	4.4	3.6	21.3	16.6	0.0
2018	84.7	63,335	6.8	32.2	3.3	5.9	4.7	4.8	19.9	21.0	0.0
2022	80.4	62,313	5.9	33.0	3.5	5.1	3,6	4.7	18.5	24.2	0.0

Blocs

This lists the relative strength of the socialist and centre-right blocs since 1973, but parties not elected to the Riksdag are inserted as "other", including the Sweden Democrats results from 1988 to 2006, but also the Christian Democrats pre-1991 and the Greens in 1982, 1985, and 1991. The sources are identical to the table above. The coalition or government mandate marked in bold formed the government after the election. New Democracy got elected in 1991 but is still listed as "other" due to the short lifespan of the party. "Elected" is the total number of percentage points from the municipality that went to parties who were elected to the Riksdag.

Year	Turnout	Votes	Left	Right	SD	Other	Elected
1973	91.5	55,242	**56.8**	41.2	0.0	2.0	98.0
1976	92.2	57,466	55.2	**43.2**	0.0	1.6	98.4
1979	91.1	56,858	57.6	**40.7**	0.0	1.7	98.3
1982	91.9	57,768	**60.1**	36.6	0.0	3.3	96.7
1985	89.9	57,305	**59.3**	39.1	0.0	1.6	98.4
1988	85.0	54,494	**61.7**	34.8	0.0	3.5	96.5
1991	85.3	54,763	50.4	**38.9**	0.0	11.7	96.5
1994	85.9	55,238	**64.3**	32.9	0.0	2.8	97.2
1998	79.7	50,641	**61.2**	36.7	0.0	2.1	97.9
2002	77.4	50,404	**60.3**	36.7	0.0	3.0	97.0
2006	79.6	53,595	54.9	**40.3**	0.0	4.8	95.2
2010	83.3	58,588	49.2	**41.9**	7.9	1.0	99.0
2014	84.0	61,217	**47.0**	33.6	16.6	2.8	97.2
2018	84.7	63,335	**42.3**	35.4	21.0	1.4	98.6

== Twin towns - Sister cities ==
Eskilstuna is twinned with:

- Bridgeton, New Jersey, United States
- Erlangen, Germany
- Esbjerg, Denmark
- Fjarðabyggð, Iceland
- Gatchina, Russia
- Haapsalu, Estonia
- Jūrmala, Latvia
- Jyväskylä, Finland
- Linyi, China
- Luton, United Kingdom
- Lviv, Ukraine
- Stavanger, Norway
- Usangi, Tanzania
