= Södermanland County =

County (län) of Sweden

Coordinates: 58°46′16″N 16°52′10″E

Södermanland County Södermanlands län (Swedish) Sörmlands län (Sörmlandic)
- County of Sweden
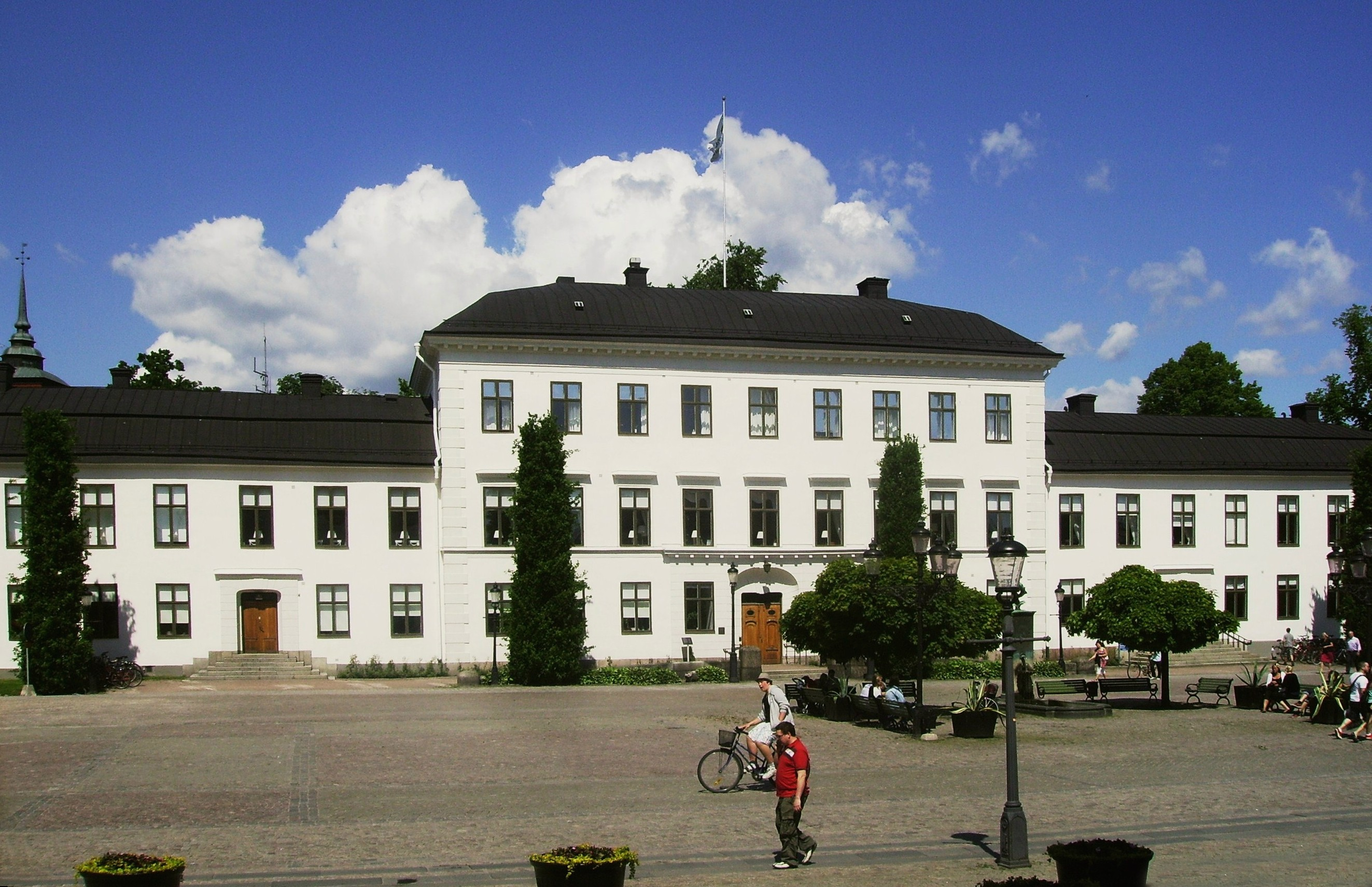

- Flag Coat of arms

- Södermanland County in Sweden

- Location map of Södermanland County in Sweden
- Country: Sweden
- Formed: 1634
- Capital: Nyköping
- Largest city: Eskilstuna
- Municipalities: 9: Eskilstuna; Flen; Gnesta; Katrineholm; Nyköping; Oxelösund; Strängnäs; Trosa; Vingåker

Government
  - Governor: Johanna Sandwall (acting) (M)
  - Council: Region Sörmland

Area
  - Total: 5,619.3 km^{2} (2,169.6 sq mi)

Population (31 December 2023)
  - Total: 301,944
  - Density: 53.733/km^{2} (139.17/sq mi)

GDP
  - Total: SEK 87 billion €9.275 billion (2015)
- Time zone: UTC+1 (CET)
  - Summer (DST): UTC+2 (CEST)
- ISO 3166 code: SE-D
- NUTS Region: SE122
- Website: www.d.lst.se

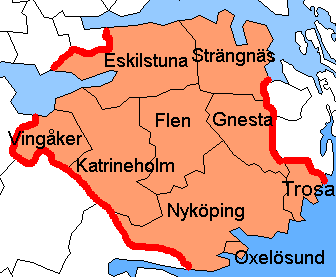

Södermanland County (Swedish: Södermanlands län, pronounced [ˈsøːdɛrmanland lɛːn]) is a county or län on the southeast coast of Sweden. In the local Sörmlandic dialects it is virtually universally shortened and pronounced as Sörmlands län, or simply Sörmland, which is the dominant pronunciation and spelling inside the county. For example, the name of the local regional council is Region Sörmland. Södermanland's capital is Nyköping and the largest settlement is Eskilstuna. In the sparsely populated interior, Katrineholm is the largest locality. In total, Södermanland has nine municipalities and about 300,000 inhabitants.

Södermanland borders the counties of Östergötland, Örebro, Västmanland, Uppsala, Stockholm and to the Baltic Sea. It holds the popular camping route called "Sörmlandsleden" which is a system of trails covering a total of approximately 100 mil (1000 km) of walking paths in Södermanland. The county has shorelines on Sweden's third and fourth largest lakes of Mälaren and Hjälmaren. There are also numerous large lakes in the Nyköpingsån river system through the west and centre of the county.

The Region Sörmland is an administrative unit, covering most of the province Södermanland. The eastern parts of the Södermanland province, largely corresponding to the Södertörn area, belong to Stockholm County. As a result of this long-standing divide, only areas inside the county are usually considered as Sörmlandic as opposed to a part of the extended Stockholm metropolitan area.

== Geography and climate ==
Södermanland runs between the lake Mälaren to the north and the Baltic Sea to its east and south. There is a large distance between the two main urban areas Eskilstuna and Nyköping of roughly 80 kilometres (50 mi), and vast forested areas in between. The centre of Södermanland is spread out between four municipality seats namely Vingåker, Katrineholm, Flen and Gnesta that separate the southern and northern areas of the county. Most parts are low-lying being part of the Mälar valley, but some higher areas can be found. The interior of Södermanland has many small rolling hills, courtesy of glacial rebound that has shaped the landscape of the area. The coastline on the Baltic Sea has many bays connected to it, with Nyköping being well-shielded from the open sea by a peninsula with plenty of inlets. Offshore there are also plenty of islets making up the Sörmlandic archipelago. The county has lake tripoints with Stockholm and Uppsala in Mälaren, with Västmanland and Örebro in Hjälmaren and a land tri-point with Örebro and Östergötland just south of Högsjö. The southwest of the county marks the southernmost points of the greater regions of Svealand and the Mälaren Valley.

The climate much like other parts of southern Sweden is a mix between oceanic and moderated continental. Summers highs are most often around 23 °C (73 °F), with lows around 12 °C (54 °F) inland and either near or above 14 °C (57 °F) on the coast due to the warm July sea surface temperatures. Winter highs differ between 0 °C (32 °F) and 1 °C (34 °F) between inland and coastal parts with lows around −4 °C (25 °F) on the coast to −6 °C (21 °F) inland and in the lakeside north. It can heavily fluctuate between different years with influences from different weather systems. Most often winters are still pronounced enough for the climate to be a clear four-season climate although the open sea most often remains ice-free year round.

== Politics ==
Region Sörmland is the name of the regional council of Södermanland, the county's self-governing local authority.

As of 2019, the local government constellation consists of the Social Democrats, Vård för Pengarna and the Centre Party. The coalition holds a majority in the regional council with 42 seats out of 71 total.

=== 2018 election results ===
Party	Votes	%	Seats	±
Social Democrats	53,130	28.7	23	0
Vård för pengarna	33,831	18.3	15	+7
Moderate Party	30,666	16.6	14	0
Sweden Democrats	24,175	13.1	11	+3
Left Party	11,113	6.0	5	+1
Centre Party	9,905	5.4	4	0
Christian Democrats	8,603	4.7	4	+1
Liberals	7,083	3.8	3	0
Green Party	5,302	2.9	0	0
Feminist Initiative	470	0.3	0	0
Others	681	0.4	0	0
Invalid/blank votes	2,817			
Total	187,776	100	71	+12

== Riksdag elections ==
The table details all Riksdag election results of Södermanland County since the unicameral era began in 1970. The blocs denote which party would support the Prime Minister or the lead opposition party towards the end of the elected parliament.

Year	Turnout	Votes	V	S	MP	C	L	KD	M	SD	NyD	Left	Right
1970	89.9	149,881	3.2	53.1		17.8	14.8	1.8	9.1			56.3	41.8
1973	92.2	154,732	3.7	50.7		23.0	9.2	1.8	11.1			54.5	43.3
1976	92.8	163,147	3.1	49.8		22.1	10.8	1.4	12.5			52.9	45.4
1979	91.9	163,741	3.9	50.9		16.4	10.7	1.3	16.3			54.8	43.3
1982	92.5	166,737	4.1	52.8	1.7	14.1	5.9	1.6	19.6			56.7	39.6
1985	90.8	166,162	4.2	51.6	1.5	10.9	13.4		18.0			55.7	42.3
1988	86.7	159,527	4.8	49.7	5.1	10.0	12.0	2.4	15.3			59.6	37.3
1991	87.2	162,051	3.8	44.0	2.9	8.0	9.0	6.2	18.3		7.2	47.7	41.5
1994	87.4	164,273	5.4	51.7	5.0	6.7	6.8	3.4	18.9		0.9	62.1	35.8
1998	81.8	152,473	10.8	43.4	4.9	4.8	4.1	10.9	19.3			59.1	39.2
2002	80.0	152,435	7.1	47.3	4.8	5.5	11.9	8.3	13.1	1.0		59.2	38.8
2006	82.0	159,750	4.9	42.2	5.1	6.9	6.8	6.2	23.4	2.5		52.3	43.2
2010	84.8	171,427	5.0	34.7	7.6	5.8	6.6	4.7	27.9	6.6		47.3	45.0
2014	86.0	178,632	5.1	34.6	6.3	5.5	4.4	3.9	22.4	15.1		46.0	36.1
2018	86.7	183,449	6.6	31.4	3.7	7.4	4.3	5.5	20.4	19.3		49.1	49.5
2022	83.5	186,884	5.2	32.9	4.0	5.9	3.6	4.7	19.2	23.0		48.0	50.5

== Municipalities ==
- Eskilstuna
- Flen
- Gnesta
- Katrineholm
- Nyköping
- Oxelösund
- Strängnäs
- Trosa
- Vingåker

== Demographics ==
=== Foreign background ===
SCB have collected statistics on backgrounds of residents since 2002. These tables consist of all who have two foreign-born parents or are born abroad themselves. The chart lists election years and the last year on record alone.

Location	2002	2006	2010	2014	2018	2019
Eskilstuna	22.2	23.7	27.0	30.6	34.8	35.7
Flen	14.4	15.5	18.6	23.7	29.1	29.7
Gnesta	8.9	9.7	11.8	13.5	16.2	16.7
Katrineholm	14.1	14.8	18.0	21.1	25.1	25.9
Nyköping	10.9	11.8	13.7	16.2	19.8	20.6
Oxelösund	16.6	18.3	18.8	22.3	27.8	28.2
Strängnäs	11.9	12.6	13.9	16.1	19.2	19.9
Trosa	13.2	13.4	14.1	15.5	18.0	18.7
Vingåker	7.4	8.5	9.8	13.9	17.7	17.9
Total	15.8	16.8	19.3	22.4	26.3	27.0
Source: SCB

== Urban areas by population ==
This is a list of Södermanland's urban areas or tätorter (dense localities with a population of at least 200).

Position	Place	Municipality	Population (2018)
1	Eskilstuna	Eskilstuna	69,816
2	Nyköping	Nyköping	32,957
3	Katrineholm	Katrineholm	24,271
4	Strängnäs	Strängnäs	14,265
5	Oxelösund	Oxelösund	11,488
6	Torshälla	Eskilstuna	9,275
7	Flen	Flen	6,636
8	Trosa	Trosa	6,260
9	Gnesta	Gnesta	6,248
10	Skiftinge	Eskilstuna	5,104
11	Vingåker	Vingåker	4,768
12	Arnö	Nyköping	4,259
13	Mariefred	Strängnäs	4,132
14	Vagnhärad	Trosa	3,632
15	Hällbybrunn	Eskilstuna	3,288
16	Åkers styckebruk	Strängnäs	3,017
17	Abborrberget	Strängnäs	2,542
18	Malmköping	Flen	2,246
19	Stigtomta	Nyköping	1,942
20	Stallarholmen	Strängnäs	1,759
21	Hälleforsnäs	Flen	1,673
22	Valla	Katrineholm	1,453
23	Ärla	Eskilstuna	1,286
24	Svalsta	Nyköping	1,107
25	Kjulaås	Eskilstuna	956
26	Sundbyholm	Eskilstuna	927
27	Hållsta	Eskilstuna	877
28	Tystberga	Nyköping	866
29	Björnlunda	Gnesta	832
30	Bergshammar	Nyköping	814
31	Sparreholm	Flen	750
32	Nävekvarn	Nyköping	743
33	Högsjö	Vingåker	680
34	Sköldinge	Katrineholm	651
35	Vrena	Nyköping	644
36	Jönåker	Nyköping	608
37	Hällberga	Eskilstuna	607
38	Stjärnhov	Gnesta	577
39	Marielund	Strängnäs	574
40	Forssjö	Katrineholm	538
41	Bie	Katrineholm	521
42	Härad	Strängnäs	509
43	Mellösa	Flen	499
44	Baggetorp	Vingåker	476
45	Sjösa	Nyköping	471
46	Björkvik	Katrineholm	461
47	Björktorp and Sanda	Strängnäs	460
48	Enstaberga	Nyköping	439
49	Kullersta, Kolsta and Hensta	Eskilstuna	416
50	Alberga	Eskilstuna	406
51	Sund	Trosa	406
52	Bettna	Flen	397
53	Merlänna	Strängnäs	395
54	Marmorbyn	Vingåker	372
55	Västerljung	Trosa	362
56	Strångsjö	Katrineholm	350
57	Tumbo	Eskilstuna	350
58	Äsköping	Katrineholm	338
59	Öbolandet	Trosa	327
60	Udden	Eskilstuna	326
61	Husby and Tuna	Strängnäs	273
62	Kalkudden	Strängnäs	269
63	Orrhammar	Flen	250
64	Läppe	Vingåker	249
65	Runtuna	Nyköping	248
66	Ålberga	Nyköping	234
67	Kvegerö	Nyköping	229
68	Skeppsvik and Sjöskogen	Nyköping	224
69	Inskogen	Oxelösund	223
70	Bälgviken	Eskilstuna	222
71	Stavsjö	Nyköping	215
72	Skebokvarn	Flen	209
73	Buskhyttan	Nyköping	201

== Heraldry ==
Södermanland County inherited its coat of arms from the province of Södermanland. When it is shown with a royal crown it represents the County Administrative Board.

== History ==
The province of Södermanland was divided into three counties in the 17th century; Nyköping County, Gripsholm County and Eskilstunahus County. They were merged into present day Södermanland County in 1683.
