= Botvid =

Botvid is a Swedish given name and surname.

People with the name include:

== Given name ==
- Saint Botvid (died 1120), Christian missionary in Sweden
- Botvid Sunesson (died 1562), Swedish prelate

== Surname ==
- John Botvid (1889–1964), Swedish actor and comedian
- Rolf Botvid (1915–1998), Swedish actor and writer
