= Tynnelsö Castle =

Castle in eastern Sweden

- Strängnäs Municipality, Sweden
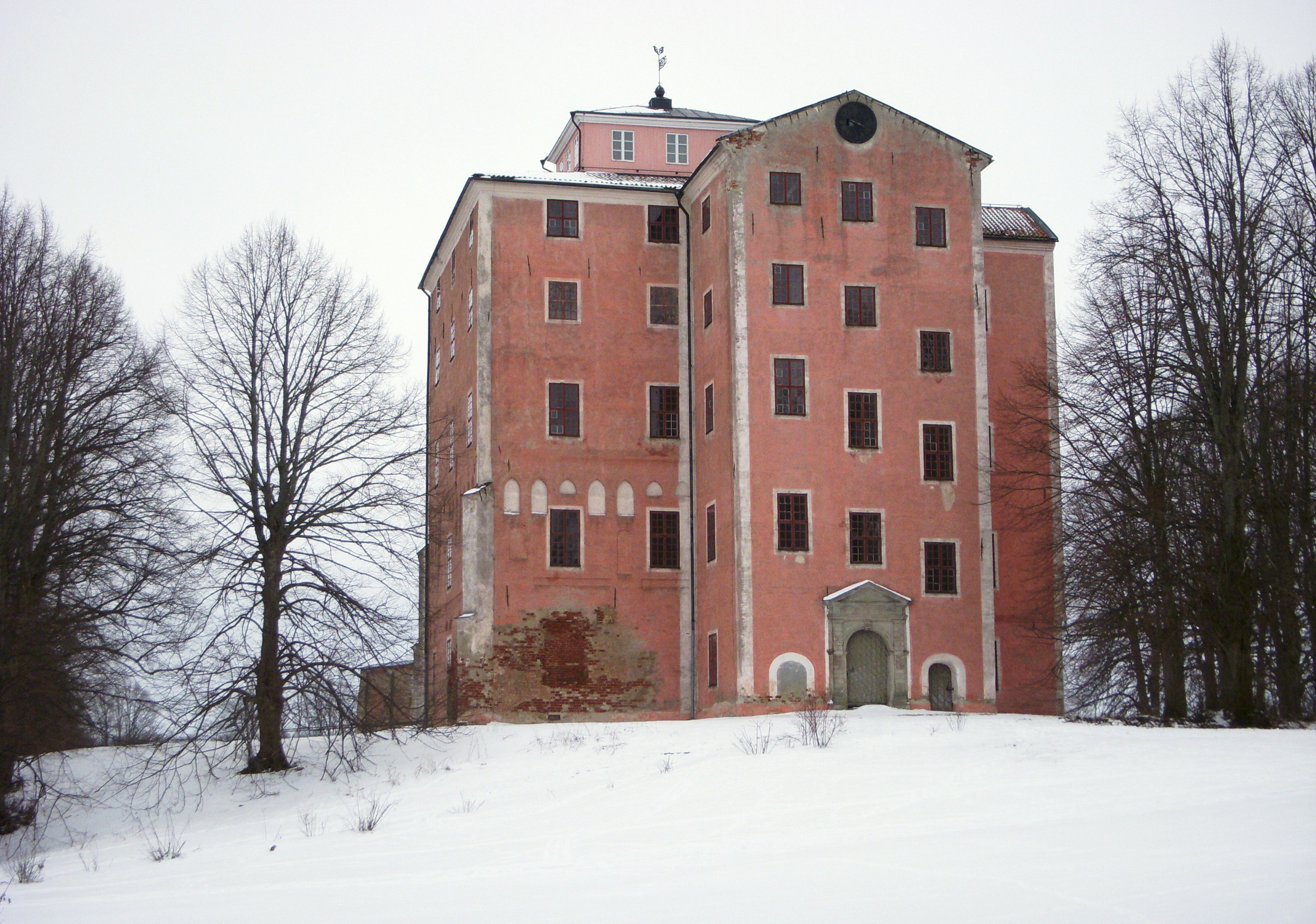
- Tynnelsö Castle

Site information
- Type: Castle

Location
- Coordinates: 59°24′44″N 17°06′01″E

Site history
- Built: Oldest parts probably from the 13th century
- Built by: Several medieval bishops of Strängnäs
- Battles/wars: Swedish War of Liberation

Tynnelsö Castle (Swedish: Tynnelsö slott) is a castle in Sweden. It is on Tynnelsö island in Lake Mälaren, a few kilometres north-east of Strängnäs. The castle was built during the Middle Ages by the bishops of Strängnäs.

== History ==
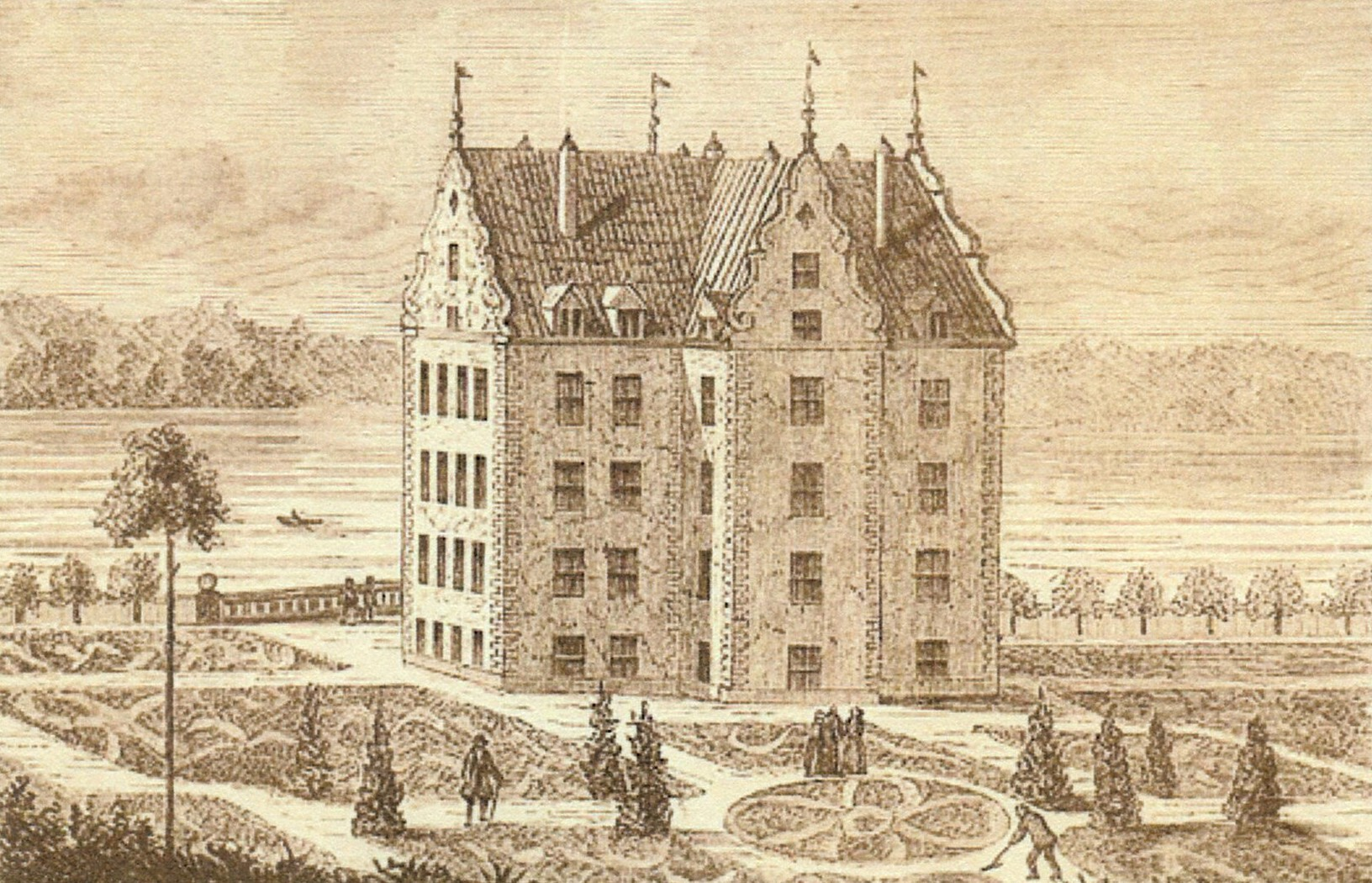
Tynnelsö Castle as it appears in Suecia Antiqua et Hodierna, still with Renaissance gables

The oldest parts of Tynnelsö Castle probably date from the 13th century. The castle is mentioned in written sources for the first time in 1282. From 1306, the estate belonged to the Diocese of Strängnäs and the castle was the property of the bishop. The castle was continuously expanded during the Middle Ages. During the time of bishop Thomas Simonsson, the castle is mentioned as one of the strongest in Sweden. A preserved list of inventories from 1443 lists the weapons housed in the castle at the time: 24 firearms, including several cannon, 52 crossbows, a barrel of crossbow bolts and 150 cannonballs. In the time of bishop Sigge (1449–63), the castle had a garrison of 100 men.

The castle saw action during the Swedish War of Liberation. It was besieged and conquered by the troops of Gustav Vasa and later used by his army as an arsenal during the siege of Stockholm. In 1527, it was confiscated by the crown of Sweden and turned into a crown estate. Gustav Vasa spent time there on several occasions, and his wife Margareta Leijonhufvud died at Tynnelsö Castle in 1551.

After the death of Gustav Vasa, the castle passed to his widow Katarina Stenbock and then to Duke Charles of Södermanland, the future Charles IX of Sweden, who started transforming it from a medieval castle to a Renaissance palace. He gave the castle as a gift to his first wife, the Maria of Simmern and, after her death, likewise to his second wife Christina of Holstein-Gottorp. Eventually it passed to his son Charles Philip, Duke of Södermanland. It was then inherited by his daughter Elizabeth Carlsdotter Gyllenhielm. It stayed in her family until the late 17th century, when it became the property of queen Hedvig Eleonora of Holstein-Gottorp.

In 1725, it was given to a Polish noblewoman, Anna Woynarowska née Mirowicz, who was niece-in-law of Ivan Mazepa, as payment for a debt that king Charles XII had to her husband. Anna Woynarowska however left Sweden in 1748, after which the castle was sold to the brothers Fredrik Willhelm and Carl Edward, Princes von Hessenstein, sons of Frederick I of Sweden and Hedvig Taube. In 1779, the castle was sold and during most of the 19th century passed between different owners. In 1940, it became the property of the Royal Swedish Academy of Letters, History and Antiquities, who initiated a renovation scheme.

== Architecture ==
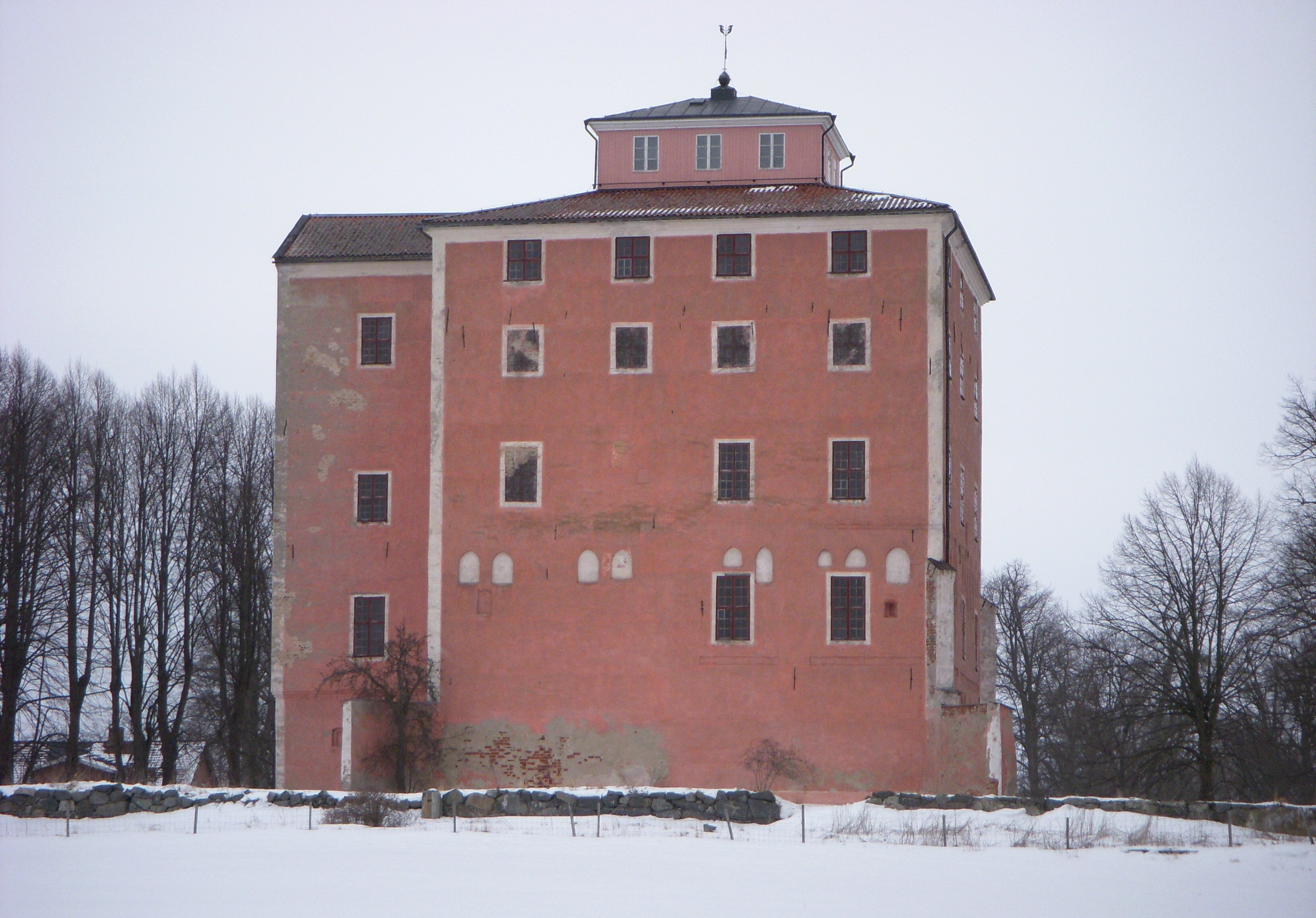
View of Tynnelsö Castle from another angle

The oldest parts of the building are the parts furthermost away from the water. This first building, dating from the 13th century, was a rectangular brick building. It was continuously expanded during the Middle Ages until it attained its present, almost square shape during the 15th century. Large reconstruction works were carried out during the ownership of duke Charles, circa 1580–90. The building was made higher, Renaissance gables were added and the interior remade. The gables were removed later, probably during the ownership of Anna Woynarowska, and further changes were made during the 19th century, for example the addition of the roof lantern. During much of the 19th century the castle furthermore suffered from neglect.

From the outset, the building had a double function as a fortification and a palace. The materials used, such as brick, were the most expensive of the day and reflect that the castle was used for representational and recreational purposes by the bishops of Strängnäs.

The castle is surrounded by a former deer park, which since 2003 enjoys protection as a nature reserve and forms part of the EU-wide ecological network Natura 2000.

== See also ==
- List of castles and palaces in Sweden
