= Floda =

Floda may refer to:

- Floda, Gagnef, an urban area in Gagnef Municipality, Sweden
- Floda, Lerum, an urban area in Lerum Municipality, Sweden
- Flodafors, a small settlement in Katrineholm Municipality, Sweden
