= List of bishops of Strängnäs =

This is a list of the bishops of Strängnäs, part of the Church of Sweden that has its seat in Strängnäs Cathedral in Strängnäs, south of Lake Mälaren, Sweden).

== Bishops before the Reformation ==
- Gerdar 1129–1159
- Vilhelmus 1171–1190
- Uffe 1208–1210
- Olov Basatömer 1219–1224
- Throgillius 1233–1241
- Col 1253–1257
- Finvid 1267–1275
- Anund Jonsson 1275–1291
- Isarus 1292–1307
- Styrbjörn 1308–1343
- Frenderus 1343–1345
- Sigmundus 1345–1355
- Thyrgillus Johannis 1355–1378
- Tord Gunnarsson 1378–1401
- Petrus Johannis 1401–1408
- Gjord Petersson Rumpa 1409–1410
- Andreas Johannis 1410–1419
- Arnoldus Johannis 1420–1443
- Thomas Simonsson 1429–1443
- Ericus Birgeri 1443–1449
- Siggo Ulphonis 1449–1463
- Johannes Magni 1463–1479
- Kort Rogge 1479–1501
- Mattias Gregersson (Lillie) 1501–1520
- Jens Andersen Beldenak 1520–1521
- Magnus Sommar 1522–1536

== Lutheran bishops after the Reformation ==
- Botvid Sunesson 1536–1555
- Ericus Nicolai Swart 1557–1561
- Botvid Sunesson 1561–1562
- Nicolaus Olaui 1563–1585
- Petrus Jonae 1586–1607
- Petrus Kenicius 1608–1609
- Laurentius Paulinus Gothus 1609–1637
- Laurentius Olai Wallius 1637–1638
- Jacobus Johannis Zebrozynthius 1639–1642
- Johannes Matthiae 1643–1664
- Erik Gabrielsson Emporagrius 1664–1674
- Carolus Lithman 1674–1686
- Erik Benzelius the Elder 1687–1700
- Johannes Bilberg 1701–1717
- Daniel Norlindh 1717–1728
- Daniel Lundius 1731–1747
- Erik Alstrin 1749–1762
- Jacob Serenius 1763–1776
- Carl Jesper Benzelius 1776–1793
- Stefan Insulin 1793–1803
- Johan Adam Tingstadius 1803–1827
- Per Thyselius 1829–1838
- Hans Olov Holmström 1839–1852
- Thure Annerstedt 1852–1880
- Adam Teodor Strömberg 1881–1889
- Uddo Lechard Ullman 1889–1927
- Sam Stadener 1927–1933
- Gustaf Aulén 1933–1952
- Dick Helander 1952–1954
- Gösta Lundström 1955–1972
- Åke Kastlund 1972–1982
- Tord Simonsson 1982–1989
- Jonas Jonson 1989–2005
- Hans-Erik Nordin 2005–2015
- Johan Dalman 2015–today
