= Flodafors =

Coordinates: 59°04′01″N 16°21′39″E

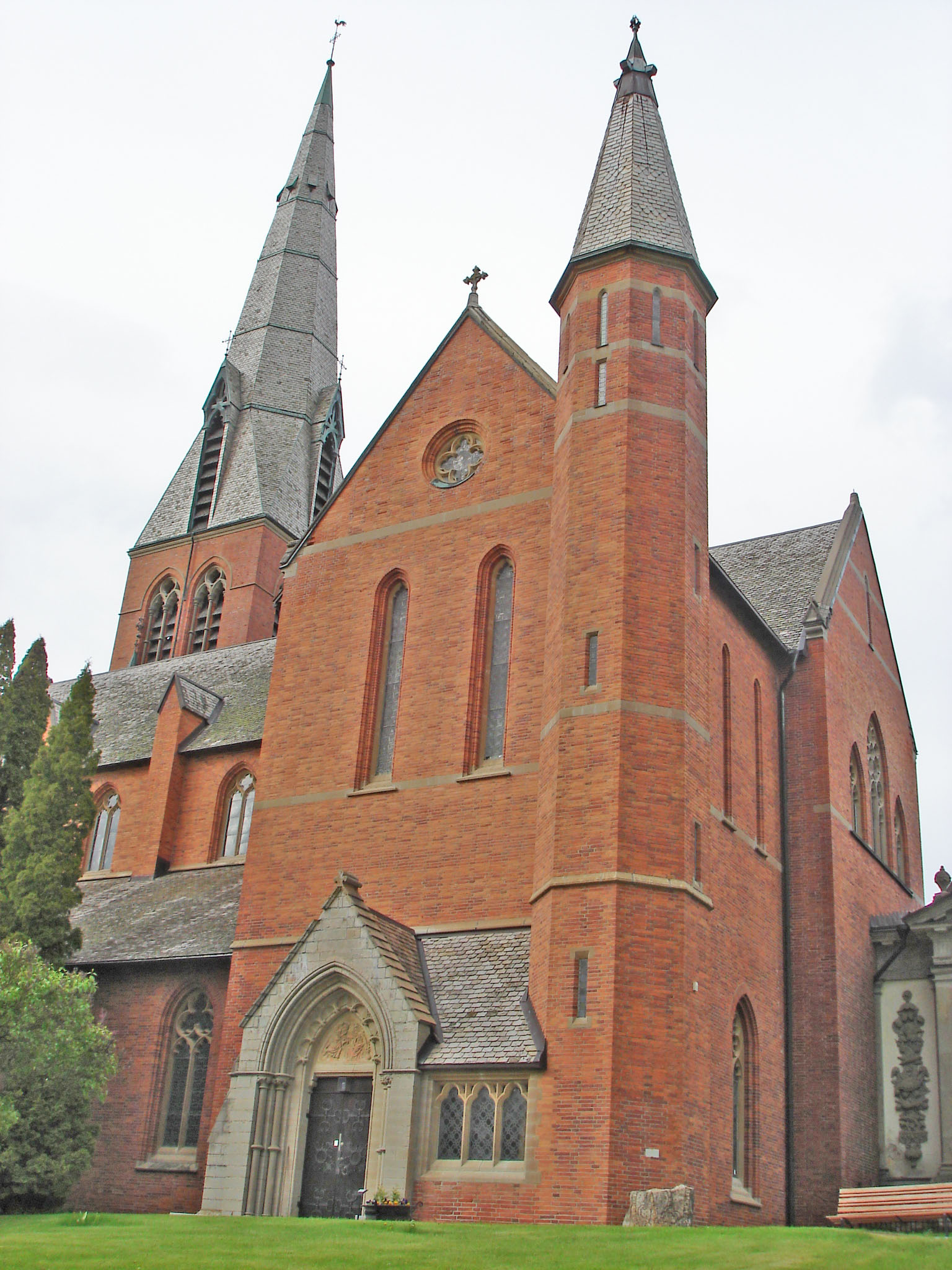
Floda Church in Södermanland

Flodafors is a small village in Katrineholm Municipality in Södermanland County, Sweden. Flodafors is often called Floda for convenience. Neighbouring villages include Bie and Valla. The village is located on the Western Main Line between Katrineholm and Flen. Floda is well known for Floda Church (Floda kyrka).

== Floda Church ==
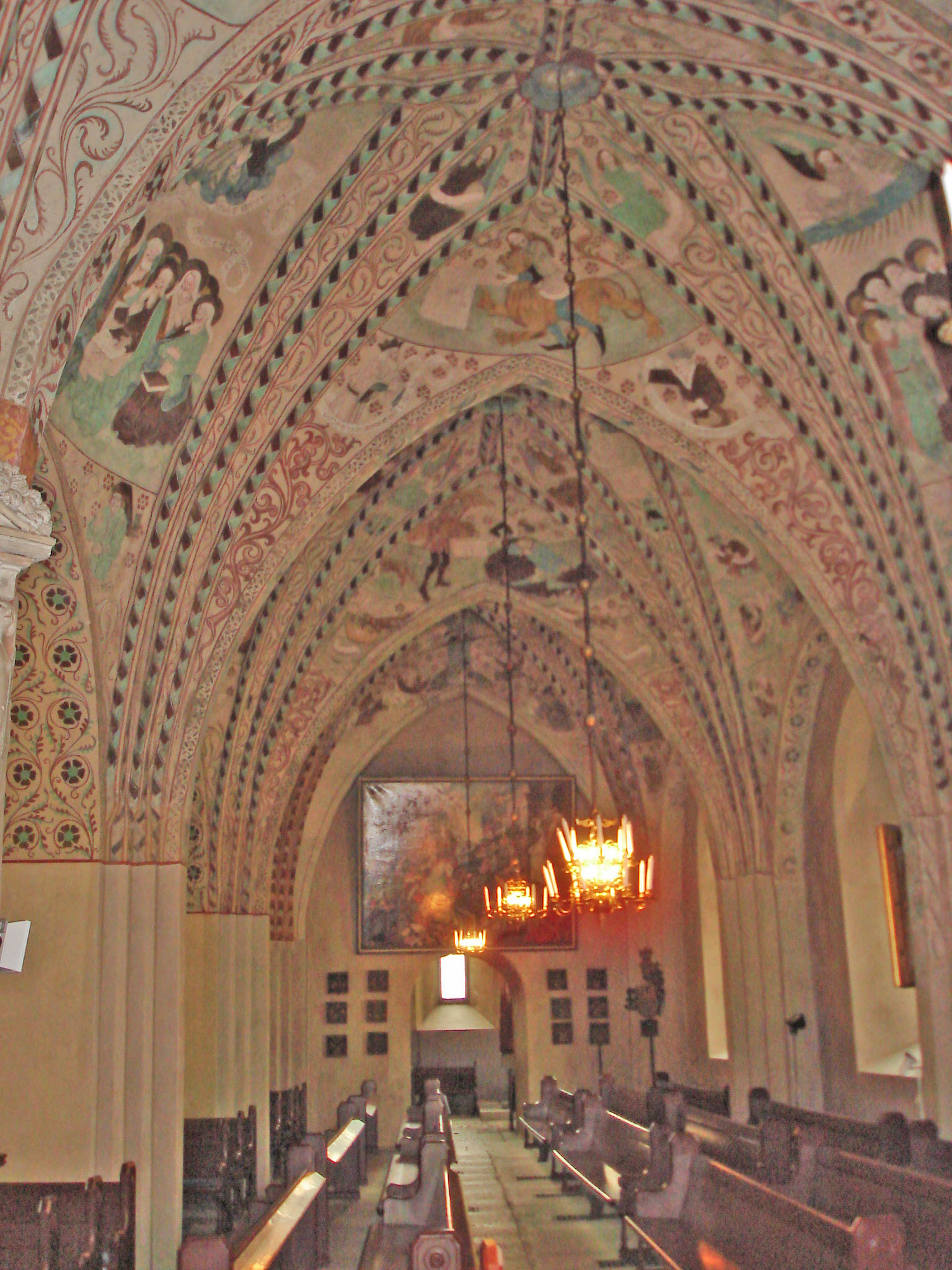
Floda church interior

Floda church is in Katrineholmsbygden parish in the Diocese of Strängnäs of the Church of Sweden. The church is built of stone and was originally constructed during the 12th century. Some of the paintings in the church date to the 1480s and were made by Albertus Pictor (c. 1440 – c. 1507). Among the church's furnishings are an altar cabinet from 1450, the Renaissance-style pulpit from 1662 and the baptismal font which was donated in 1671.

In the 1630s, rebuilding began during which the church was extended and new sacristy was built. The choir was completed in 1666. In 1885–1888, the church was rebuilt into three-edged neo-Gothic brick basilica under the direction of architect Adolf Kjellström (1834-1932). The renovation utilized plans made by architect Axel Herman Hägg (1835-1921).

The church's main organ was built for the restoration in 1885 by the organ builder company P.L. Åkerman & Lund (Åkerman & Lund Orgelbyggeri) of Stockholm. It was restored during 2006.

== Climate ==
SMHI has had a weather station operating in Floda since 1995. It has a borderline humid continental climate (Köppen Dfb) with sizeable maritime influence, resulting in mild winter averages for its latitude. Floda is still less influenced by the Baltic Sea than areas to its south such as Nyköping and Oxelösund, resulting in harsher winter frosts and larger summer diurnal temperature variation than the coastal parts of the county. Although a −33.2 °C (−27.8 °F) reading occurred at the station's location measured in a brief existence of a similar station on 20 February 1963, the chart below only records the modern inceptions' extremes. Due to Flodafors being distinctly influenced by being in the interior, it has some of the warmest average afternoon summer temperatures in all of Scandinavia.

Climate data for Floda (2002–2021 averages, extremes since 1995)
Month	Jan	Feb	Mar	Apr	May	Jun	Jul	Aug	Sep	Oct	Nov	Dec	Year
Record high °C (°F)	11.6 (52.9)	12.4 (54.3)	18.6 (65.5)	24.0 (75.2)	28.7 (83.7)	32.2 (90.0)	34.4 (93.9)	32.2 (90.0)	26.7 (80.1)	22.0 (71.6)	16.6 (61.9)	12.9 (55.2)	34.4 (93.9)
Mean maximum °C (°F)	7.0 (44.6)	7.8 (46.0)	13.6 (56.5)	19.5 (67.1)	24.8 (76.6)	28.4 (83.1)	29.6 (85.3)	28.3 (82.9)	23.3 (73.9)	16.8 (62.2)	11.8 (53.2)	7.6 (45.7)	30.4 (86.7)
Mean daily maximum °C (°F)	0.5 (32.9)	1.2 (34.2)	5.6 (42.1)	11.9 (53.4)	17.2 (63.0)	21.4 (70.5)	23.8 (74.8)	22.3 (72.1)	17.7 (63.9)	10.6 (51.1)	5.4 (41.7)	2.3 (36.1)	11.7 (53.0)
Daily mean °C (°F)	−2.6 (27.3)	−2.3 (27.9)	1.1 (34.0)	6.1 (43.0)	11.0 (51.8)	15.3 (59.5)	17.6 (63.7)	16.5 (61.7)	12.5 (54.5)	6.9 (44.4)	2.9 (37.2)	−0.4 (31.3)	7.1 (44.7)
Mean daily minimum °C (°F)	−5.6 (21.9)	−5.8 (21.6)	−3.4 (25.9)	0.2 (32.4)	4.8 (40.6)	9.1 (48.4)	11.4 (52.5)	10.6 (51.1)	7.3 (45.1)	3.2 (37.8)	0.3 (32.5)	−3.0 (26.6)	2.4 (36.4)
Mean minimum °C (°F)	−19.2 (−2.6)	−17.4 (0.7)	−12.7 (9.1)	−6.3 (20.7)	−2.5 (27.5)	2.5 (36.5)	6.1 (43.0)	3.8 (38.8)	−0.6 (30.9)	−4.5 (23.9)	−9.0 (15.8)	−14.0 (6.8)	−22.1 (−7.8)
Record low °C (°F)	−29.2 (−20.6)	−32.8 (−27.0)	−22.9 (−9.2)	−16.9 (1.6)	−6.9 (19.6)	−1.3 (29.7)	4.2 (39.6)	−0.3 (31.5)	−5.7 (21.7)	−10.0 (14.0)	−18.4 (−1.1)	−30.1 (−22.2)	−32.8 (−27.0)
Average precipitation mm (inches)	36.8 (1.45)	28.6 (1.13)	26.2 (1.03)	27.5 (1.08)	50.4 (1.98)	63.7 (2.51)	61.3 (2.41)	76.9 (3.03)	41.9 (1.65)	53.8 (2.12)	46.5 (1.83)	42.9 (1.69)	556.5 (21.91)
Average extreme snow depth cm (inches)	20 (7.9)	23 (9.1)	15 (5.9)	3 (1.2)	0 (0)	0 (0)	0 (0)	0 (0)	0 (0)	0 (0)	6 (2.4)	12 (4.7)	28 (11)
Source 1: SMHI Open Data for Floda, precipitation
Source 2: SMHI Open Data for Floda, temperature

== Recent events ==
In 2007, the Social Democrats and the Left Party in Katrineholm Municipality decided to shut down the elementary school in Flodafors. News of closure pulled off a great public protest, led by people in Flodafors. The Floda independent school association formed and has been operating school activities since the fall of 2009, in the old school premises.

== Other sources ==
- Robert Bennett; P-O Karlsson (1988) Floda kyrka : Oppunda härad, Södermanland (Stockholm: Almqvist & Wiksell)
