= Djulö kvarn =

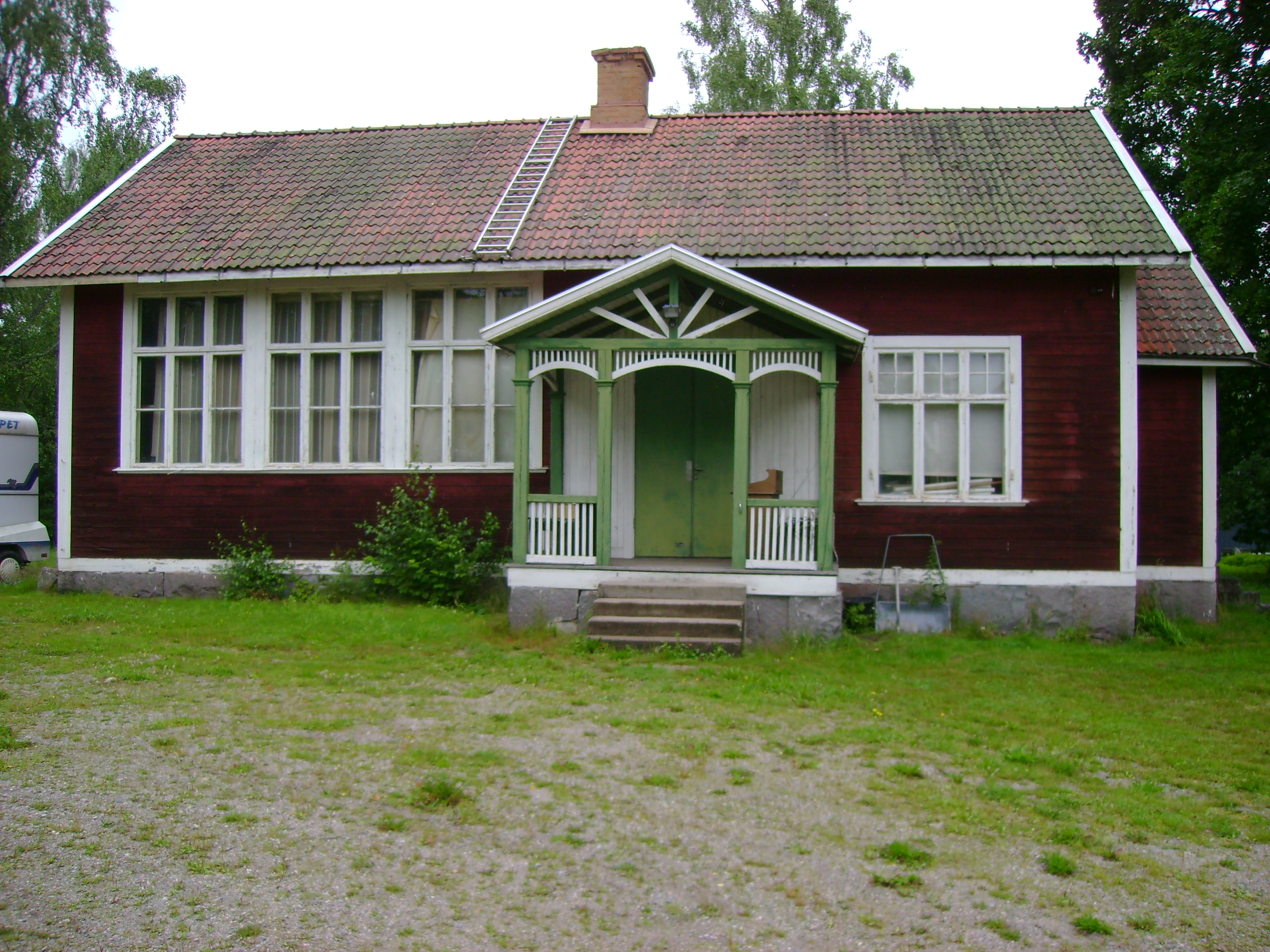
- Djulö skola in Djulö Kvarn

- Location within Södermanland Location within Sweden
- Coordinates: 58°58′N 16°12′E
- Country: Sweden
- Province: Södermanland
- County: Södermanland County
- Municipality: Katrineholm Municipality

Area
  - Total: 0.30 km^{2} (0.12 sq mi)

Population (31 December 2010)
  - Total: 209
  - Density: 706/km^{2} (1,830/sq mi)
- Time zone: UTC+1 (CET)
  - Summer (DST): UTC+2 (CEST)
- Climate: Dfb

Djulö kvarn is a locality situated in Katrineholm Municipality, Södermanland County, Sweden with 209 inhabitants in 2010.
