= Åke Kastlund =

Swedish bishop

The Right Reverend Åke Kastlund
- Bishop of Strängnäs
- Church: Church of Sweden
- Diocese: Strängnäs
- In office: 1972–1982
- Predecessor: Sam Stadener
- Successor: Dick Helander

Orders
- Consecration: 1972

Personal details
- Born: 22 February 1916 Avesta, Dalarna County, Sweden
- Died: 3 August 1999 (aged 77)
- Denomination: Lutheran

Åke Kastlund (22 February 1916 – 3 August 1999) was a Swedish prelate who served as Bishop of Strängnäs from 1972 till 1982.

== Biography ==
Kastlund graduated in 1943 from the University of Copenhagen. He served as an assistant priest in Västerås Cathedral between 1946 and 1952. He then served in the Lutheran World Federation in South America, Central America and Mexico between 1952 and 1956 and was director of the Confederation's Swedish section between 1956 and 1970. Between 1970 and 1972, Kastlund was pastor Primarius, a now defunct title used in the Diocese of Stockholm. He subsequently was the Dean of Stockholm Cathedral.

In 1972, after the retirement of Gösta Lundström as Bishop of Strängnäs, Kastlund was elected to succeed him. He retained the post till 1982.

In addition to his pastoral career, Kastlund had various assignments and was Swedish delegate in several world church conferences. He published the journal Lutherhjälpen between 1956 and 1970 and was a board member of the International Lutheran Aid from 1963 till 1970 and chairman from 1970 till 1977. He also worked for the Church Council's aid council from 1968 till 71. He earned an honorary doctorate from Muhlenberg College in 1973.
