= David of Munktorp =

Anglo-Saxon Cluniac monk and saint (d. 1082)

Saint David of Munktorp OSB
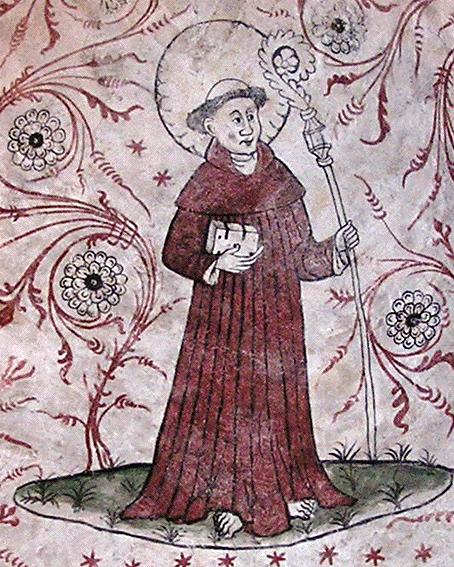
- Saint David in Överselö church

Abbot
- Born: England
- Died: 1082; Sweden
- Venerated in: Eastern Orthodox Church; Roman Catholic Church; Lutheranism
- Feast: June 25
- Attributes: Abbot's staff, book, biretta

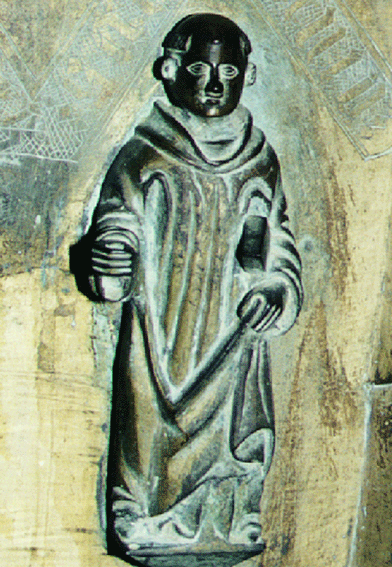
David of Munktorp statue on the baptismal font in Munktorp Church

Saint David of Munktorp (David av Munktorp) was an Anglo-Saxon Cluniac monk of the 11th century.

David was sent as a missionary to Sweden by Saint Sigfrid of Växjö along with Saint Botvid and Saint Eskil. The missionaries David, Eskil, and Botvid preached chiefly in Södermanland and Västmanland, in the area of Lake Mälaren.

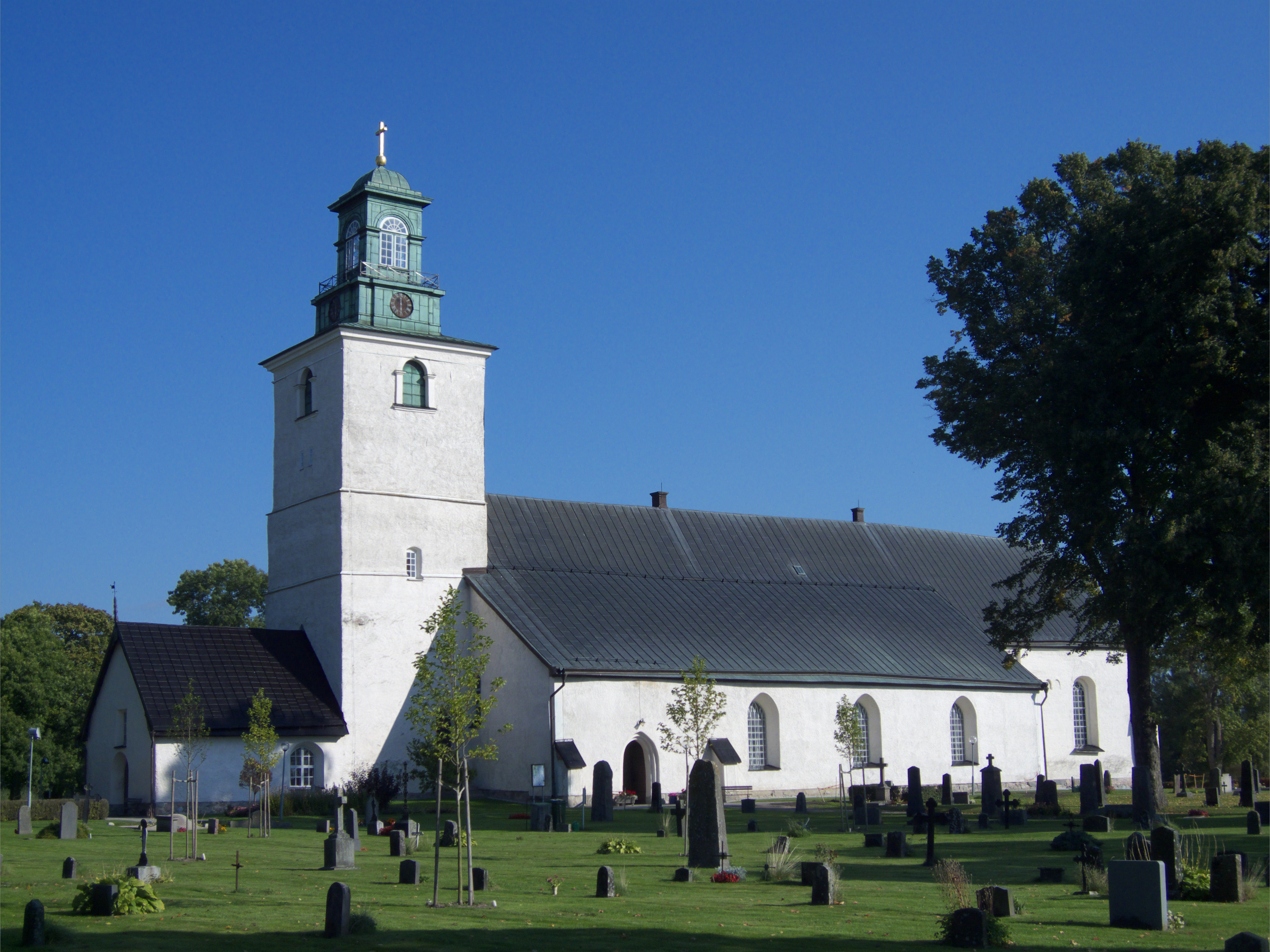
Munktorp Church Västmanland County Sweden

David is associated with Munktorp, a village situated in Köping Municipality, in Västmanland County. He reportedly originated Munktorp Church (Munktorps kyrka). The original church structures are known as David's Church (Davidskyrkan). There is an ancient carving of St. David. Munktorp Church is in Västerås diocese, northeast of Köping, Sweden.

David became known as the Västmanland apostle (Västmanlands apostel). An oral tradition about David of Munktorp, as retold by Grau in 1754 states that St David was so holy that he could hang his gloves on the sun rays. David died peacefully in 1082 of old age. After his death, his remains were buried in Munktorps kyrka.

According to the Västerås breviary, David came to evangelize in Sweden in order to become a martyr. It further says that David "wandered among villages and towns, preaching the word of God and baptizing the converted, kept nightly prayer vigils, committing to God with tears and sighs his plentiful offspring, which he had thus born in the Lord".
