= Vårfruberga Abbey =

Former Cistercian monastery in Södermanland, Sweden

Coordinates: 59°26′19″N 16°56′14″E

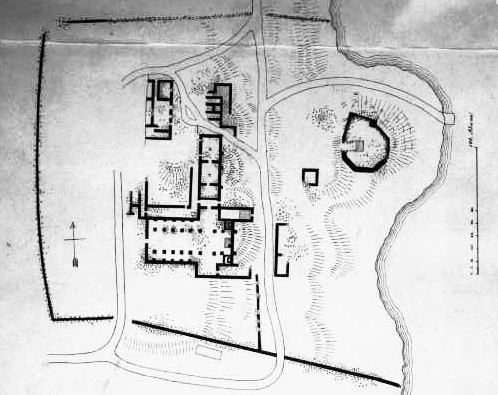
Reconstruction of the plan of Vårfruberga Abbey

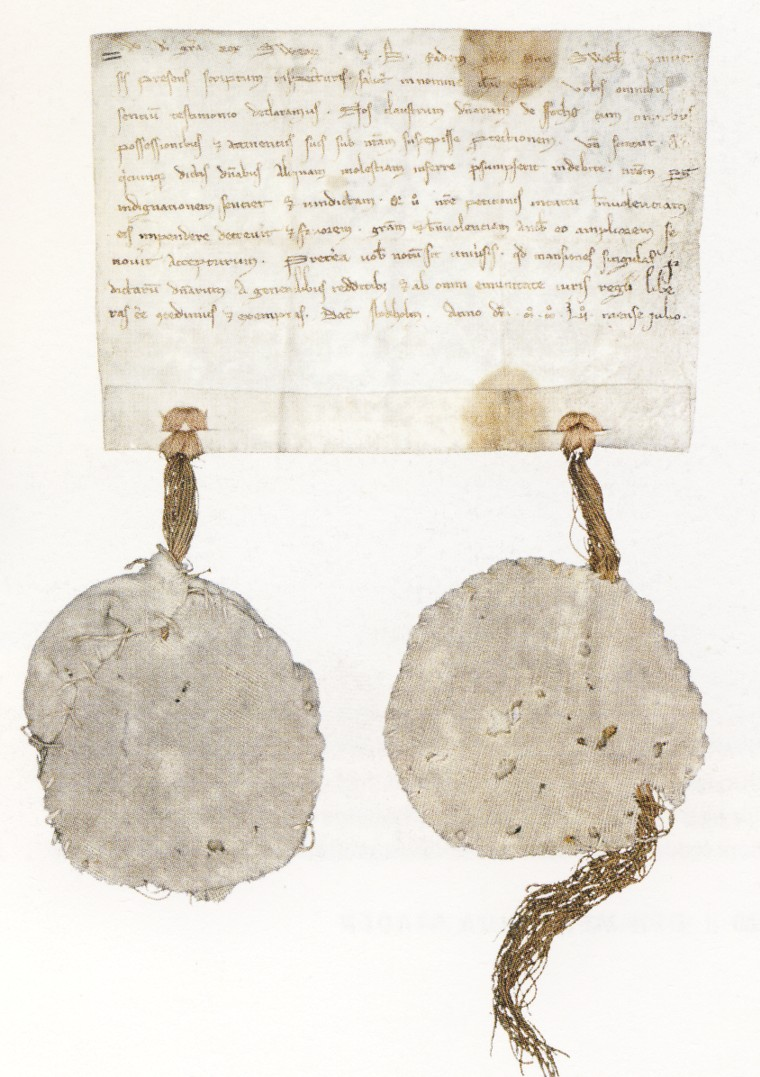
Letter of protection from Birger Jarl and Valdemar of Sweden to Fogdö Abbey 1252

Vårfruberga Abbey (Swedish: Vårfruberga kloster), previously Fogdö Abbey (Fogdö kloster) was a Cistercian monastery of nuns from the 12th century until 1527, situated 1 mile north-west of Strängnäs on the Fogdö peninsula in Lake Mälaren, formerly a parish, in Södermanland, Sweden.

== History ==
=== Fogdö Abbey ===
In the 12th century a house of Benedictine nuns was established here, but its exact location is obscure. Excavations in 1991–92 revealed that a medieval fortification had been built on an elevation near the water, and it is possible that the nuns were displaced from their original place of settlement on this strategic site to make room for the fort. This would explain why they moved to what is now Fogdö church, where the monastery was located from 1233. The church was used both as a parish church and as a monastic one, as is testified by an inset opening in the south wall – a so-called "nun's window" ("nunneporten"). The quire was also widened so as better to accommodate the nuns' choral liturgy. Judging from the surviving walls, the services of a builder trained in the Cistercian style were obtained for the project.

In 1252 a letter was sent to the abbey offering protection from, and sealed by, Birger Jarl and his son Valdemar, which is still preserved in the Riksarkivet.

=== Vårfruberga Abbey ===
After 50 years the nuns moved again to the present Kungsberg (3 km east of Fogdö), where they were able to have built a full monastic complex in accordance with the Cistercian principles of monastery construction and layout. The new buildings were put into operation in 1289. At the same time the name of the community was changed to Vårfruberga ("Mountain of Our Lady"), and was formally accepted into the Cistercian order, as a daughter house of Julita Abbey.

The church was built in the shape of a Latin cross, with three aisles and a short transept. The nave was divided by a wall to separate the nuns from the lay congregation. The church was roofed with tiles, and the external walls may also have been tile-clad.

During the Reduction of Gustav I of Sweden, king Gustav Vasa dissolved the abbey and appropriated its property and estates to the crown. He had the monastery buildings demolished to use as a source of stone for the construction of Gripsholm Castle. Parts of the walls survive.

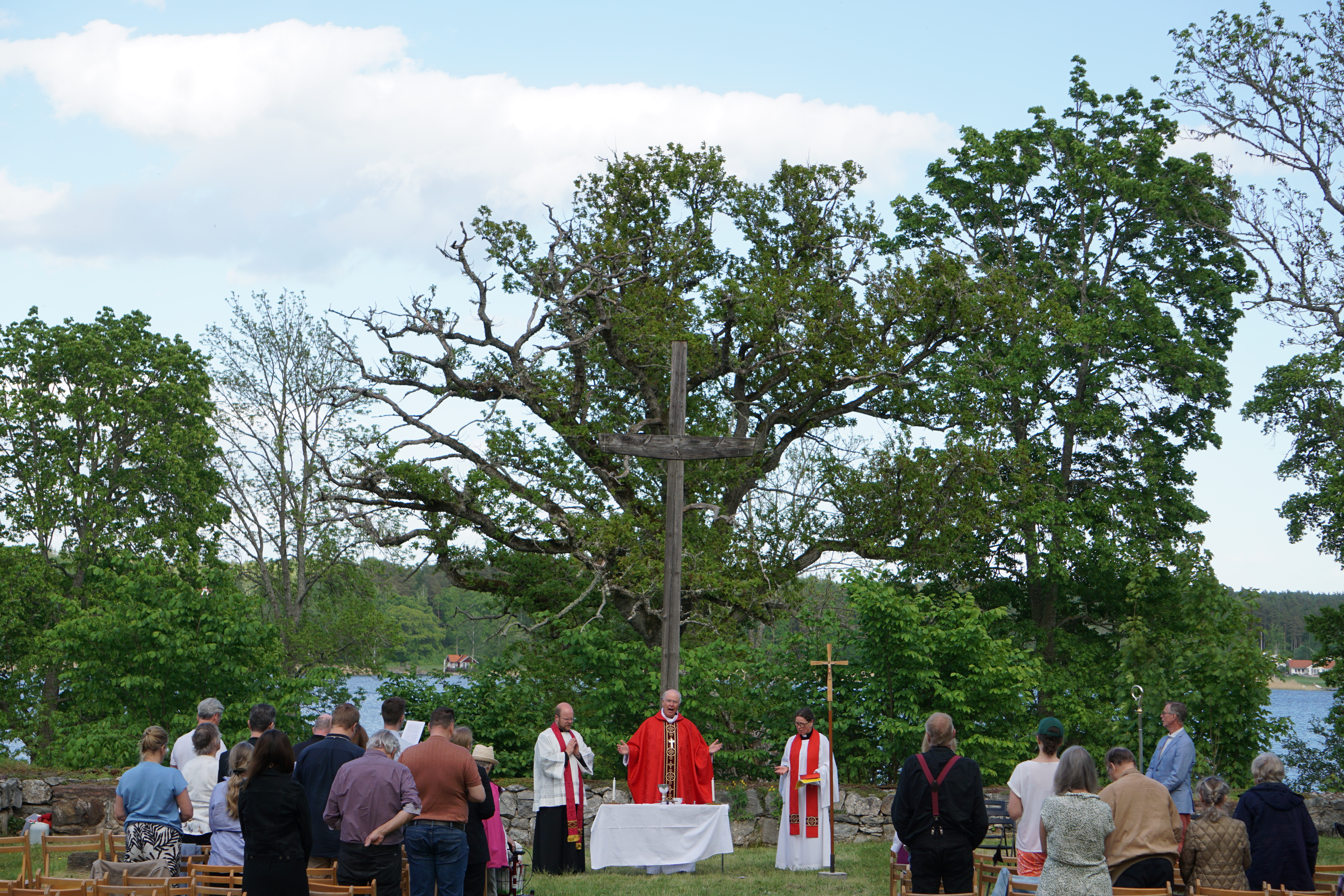
A pilgrimage Mass is celebrated by Evangelical-Lutheran bishop Johan Dalman in the abbey ruins on Pentecost; the offering of the Mass is held annually on Pentecost here under the auspices of the Diocese of Strängnäs

== Abbesses ==
The abbesses are only partially known.

- Margareta (1233–1254)
- In(grid?) (1278)
- Kunigunda (1299–1323)
- Ingrid Birgersdotter (1343–1351)
- Gertrud Jonsdotter (1355–1358)
- Regimod (Andersdotter?) (1348–1400)
- Martha (1405)
- Mechtild (1408–1415)
- Cecilia Jönsdotter (1421–1447)
- Margareta Beyentsdotter (1457)
- Cecilia Jönsdotter (1463)
- Lucia (1466–1474)
- Berette Eriksdotter (1494)
- Margareta Laurecnidotter (1508)
- Martha Henriksdotter (1520- )

== Sources and external links ==
- Uppgifter från Riksantikvarieämbetets byggnadsregister (in Swedish)
- Vårfruberga klosterruin (in Swedish)
- Kungsbergs kungsgård (in Swedish)
- Fogdö kyrka (in Swedish)
- Fogdö kyrka (in Swedish)
