= Saint Eskil =

Anglo-Saxon monk

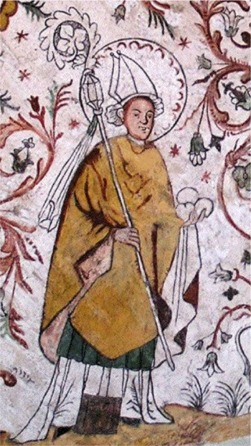
- Eskil, depicted as a bishop with his attribute, three stones. Painting in Överselö Church, Sweden.

Bishop and martyr
- Born: England
- Died: Strängnäs, Sweden
- Venerated in: Eastern Orthodox Church; Roman Catholic Church
- Feast: June 12 (June 11 in the Diocese of Strängnäs)
- Attributes: episcopal attire; three stones
- Patronage: Södermanland; the Diocese of Strängnäs

Saint Eskil (11th century) was an Anglo-Saxon monk particularly venerated during the end of the 11th century in the province of Södermanland, Sweden. He was the founder of the first diocese of the lands surrounding Lake Mälaren, today the Diocese of Strängnäs. He is the patron saint of Södermanland and the Diocese of Strängnäs.

== Life ==
Saint Eskil was sent as a missionary bishop to the Lake Mälaren area by Saint Sigfrid of Växjö along with Saint Botvid and Saint David. Botvid lies buried in Botkyrka, today a suburb of Stockholm in the east of Södermanland. All three saints are known to have perished trying to Christianize the people living around Lake Mälaren and both Eskil and Botvid have been made patron saints of Södermanland County. David has been made patron saint of Västerås and the province of Västmanland. They all are sources of several medieval legends.

Eskil probably lived during the reign of King Inge the Elder at the end of the 11th century. Alban Butler says that Eskil was a kinsman of Sigfrid. He was an itinerant missionary bishop who made the village of Tuna (present day Eskilstuna) his missionary diocese. Older accounts say he actually lived at Fors, across the river from Tuna.

Later, around 1080, he made a 30 km (19 mi) journey east of Tuna to Strängnäs, an Old Norse holy place. Saint Eskil was killed by being stoned and chopped up with an axe, according to tradition, because he disrupted a holy ritual. Saint Eskil's followers decided to take his corpse back to Tuna. The local tradition says that during that journey, his body was placed on the ground and that a miraculous spring gushed from that spot and started to flow out of the mountainside just outside Strängnäs. The spring is known as the Spring of Saint Eskil and is still there today.

Saint Eskil was buried in Tuna. Strängnäs was later converted to Christianity and the diocese that Eskil had created in Tuna was moved or reestablished in Strängnäs.

== Legend ==
According to the source closest in time, a legend of the Danish king Saint Canute, which was authored about 1122 by Ælnoth of Canterbury, an Anglo-Saxon priest who had settled in Denmark, an "Eskillinus", an English bishop of noble origins, was killed by the "wild barbarians" (specified as the Suethi et Gothi, i.e. Swedes and Geats) among whom he was preaching the gospel.

In its more developed form, the legend of Eskil is attested from the 13th century and known from a few different sources: according to this, he was successful in his mission during the reign of King Inge, but killed by Blot-Sweyn when trying to stop a pagan sacrifice on the hill where the Strängnäs Cathedral now stands. When the people would not listen to his remonstrances, he is said, by his prayers, to have raised a terrible storm that disrupted the ritual. King Blot-Sweyn then ordered him executed for sorcery. He was killed by stoning and with axes, and the stones later became his attribute.

Some Christians attempted to bring his body back to Fors, but got only so far as Tuna when a dense fog impeded their progress, which they took as a sign to bury the saint there. The legend shows stylistic influence from various sources, including the legend of Saint Olaf of Norway.

== Veneration ==
Strängnäs Cathedral was later built on the same site of the pagan ritual Eskil had observed. This is confirmed, since the hill where the cathedral now stands is known to have been the ritual site and that the first wooden church built there was dedicated to Saint Eskil. There was a chapel dedicated to Saint Eskil in the cathedral at least by 1400. Pilgrimage remained common to the site of his martyrdom although his relics were elsewhere.

The old church and burial site of Saint Eskil in Tuna later became one of the first monasteries in the region. When Tuna received its municipal status, "Eskil" was added into the name, creating Eskilstuna. Relics of Eskil existed in the church of Eskilstuna, which was traditionally seen as his burial place, as well as in other churches within the diocese, elsewhere in Sweden, and in Roskilde and Copenhagen in Denmark. The monastery of Saint Eskil was completely destroyed by Swedish king Gustav Vasa during the Protestant Reformation and was replaced with the royal castle of Eskilstuna House. A silver reliquary from the fifteenth century in the shape of a hand, to hold a piece of arm bone, is housed in the History Museum of Stockholm.

The veneration of Eskil spread in Sweden and to Denmark (Odense) and Norway (Trondheim). Eskil's feast (and purported day of death) was on 11 June, but it was later moved to June 12, except in the Diocese of Strängnäs, in order not to conflict with the Feast of Barnabas.

Eskil is the patron saint of the dioceses of Södermanland and Strägnäs in Sweden.

== Sources ==
- Toni Schmid, "Eskil", Svenskt biografiskt lexikon, vol. 14, p. 518-522.
- The Diocese of Strängnäs, Strängnäs domkyrkas historia, Pamphlet available from the Diocese
