= Sunesson =

Sunesson is a surname. Notable people with the surname include:

- Botvid Sunesson (died 1562), Swedish prelate
- Fanny Sunesson (born 1967), professional golf caddie
- Magnus Sunesson (born 1964), Swedish golfer
- Thomas Sunesson (1959–2015), Swedish footballer

== See also ==
- Suneson
