= Aspen, Katrineholm Municipality =

Lake in Katrineholm Municipality, Sweden

Aspen
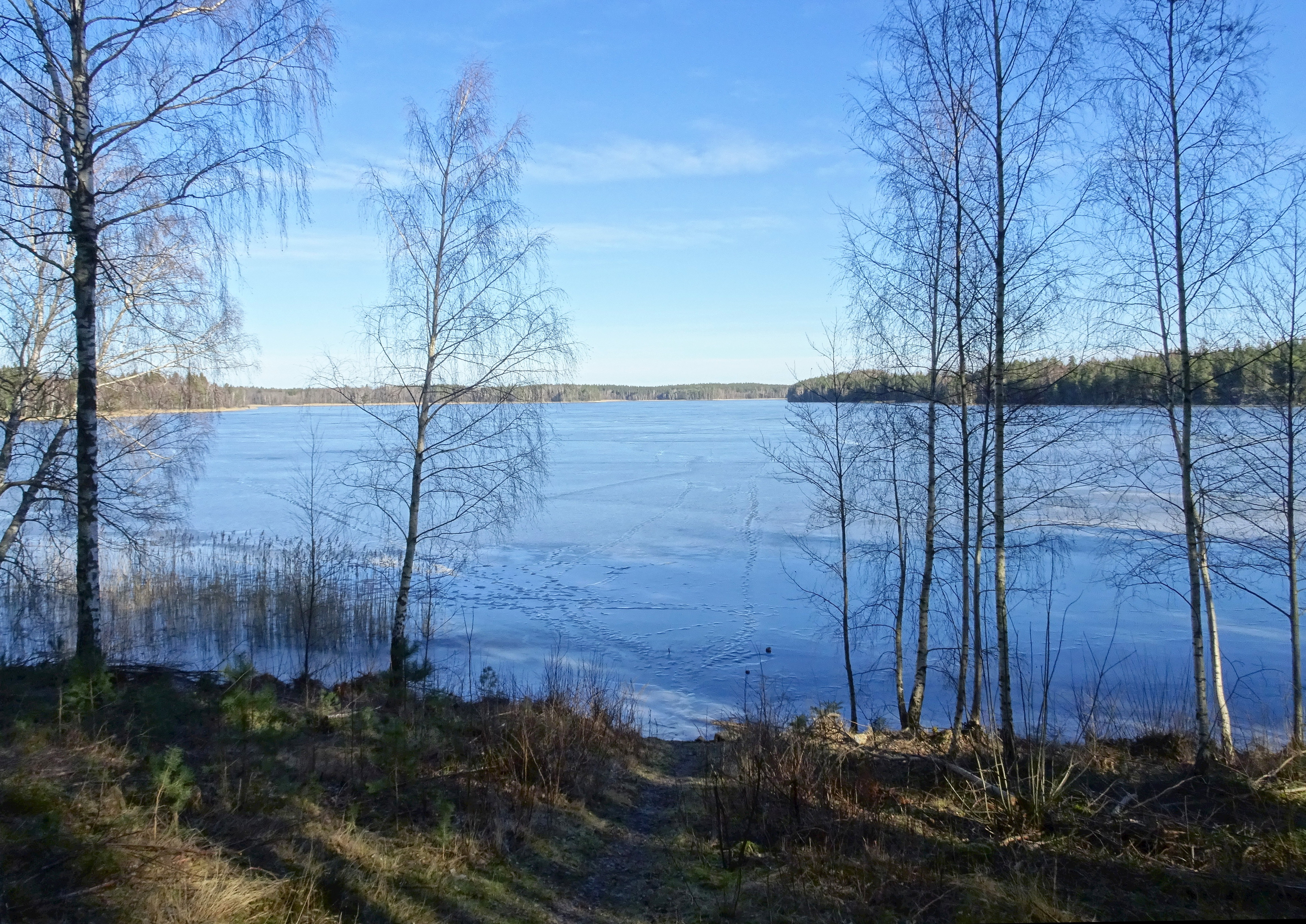
- Aspen covered with ice

- Location within Södermanland Location within Sweden
- Location: Katrineholm Municipality, Södermanland County
- Coordinates: 59°8.73′N 16°8.33′E
- Basin countries: Sweden
- Surface area: 1.32 km^{2} (0.51 sq mi)
- Max. depth: 11 m (36 ft)
- Surface elevation: 48.8 m (160 ft)

Aspen is a lake in Katrineholm Municipality, Södermanland, Sweden, and is part of Norrström's main catchment area. The lake is 11 meters deep, has an area of 1.32 square kilometers and is 48 metres above sea level. The lake is dewatered by the river Aspern which carries its water 4 km west to Öljaren.

== Description ==
Aspen is situated within a coniferous forest with flatlands to the east. The west of the lake is lined by an esker called Köpingsåsen, the western edge of which sinks below the clay soil of Julia socken.

The maximum depth of the lake is unknown, but water graves are believed to be found up to about 50 m deep. The total surface of the lake is 1.3 km^{2}, and it is limnologically classified as mesotrophic or slightly eutrophic. On the western end of the lake is a swimming area.

Aspen is believed to have gotten its name from Aspån (lit. "asp stream"), where asp, a fish related to carp, used to be caught close to Gimmersta manor.

On the eastern side of the national road 56, a rest stop is situated next to the lake. The rest stop was named the best rest stop in Södermansland by the Riksförbundet M Sverige in 2007.
