= Forssjö =

- Location within Södermanland Location within Sweden
- Coordinates: 58°57′N 16°17′E
- Country: Sweden
- Province: Södermanland
- County: Södermanland County
- Municipality: Katrineholm Municipality

Area
  - Total: 0.63 km^{2} (0.24 sq mi)

Population (31 December 2020)
  - Total: 605
  - Density: 960/km^{2} (2,500/sq mi)
- Time zone: UTC+1 (CET)
  - Summer (DST): UTC+2 (CEST)
- Climate: Dfb

Forssjö is a locality situated in Katrineholm Municipality, Södermanland County, Sweden with 537 inhabitants in 2010.
