= Selaön =

Island in Sweden

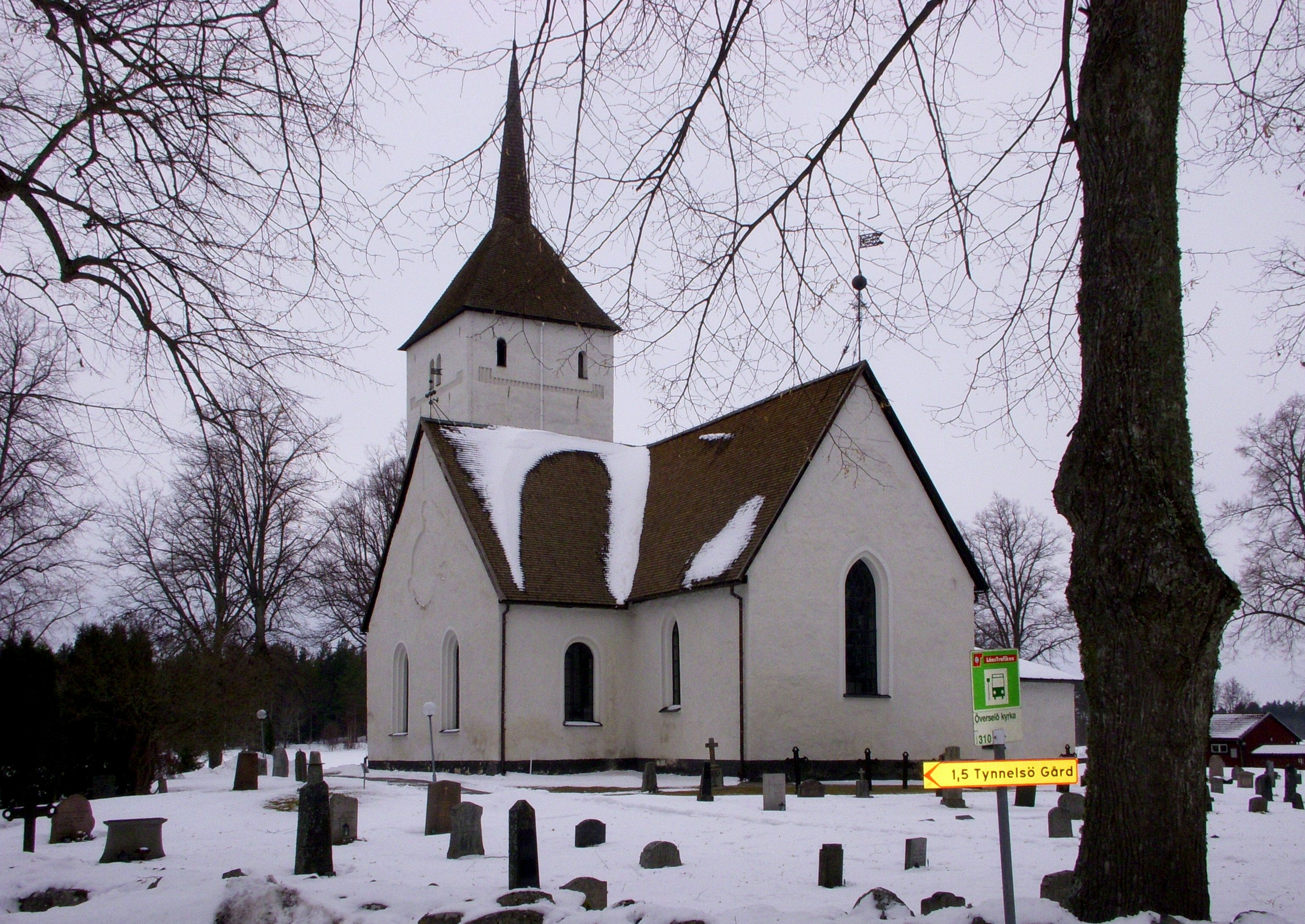
- Överselö Church on Selaön in 2011

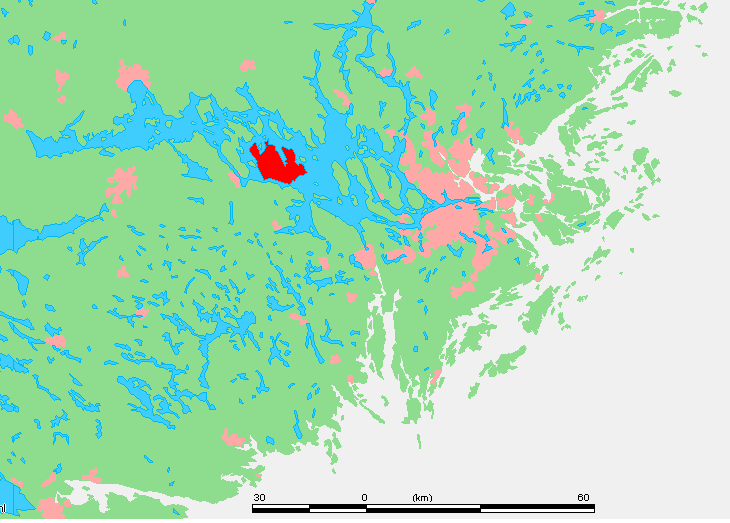

Geography
- Location: Mälaren
- Coordinates: 59°24′N 17°12′E
- Area: 94.72 km^{2} (36.57 sq mi)

Administration
- Sweden
- County: Södermanland
- Municipality: Strängnäs

Selaön is the largest island in Mälaren, Sweden, and covers 94.72 km². It is located at Stallarholmen, east of Strängnäs, and it has about 1,800 permanent residents. It is connected by a bridge to the mainland. It is the largest island in any lake in Sweden.

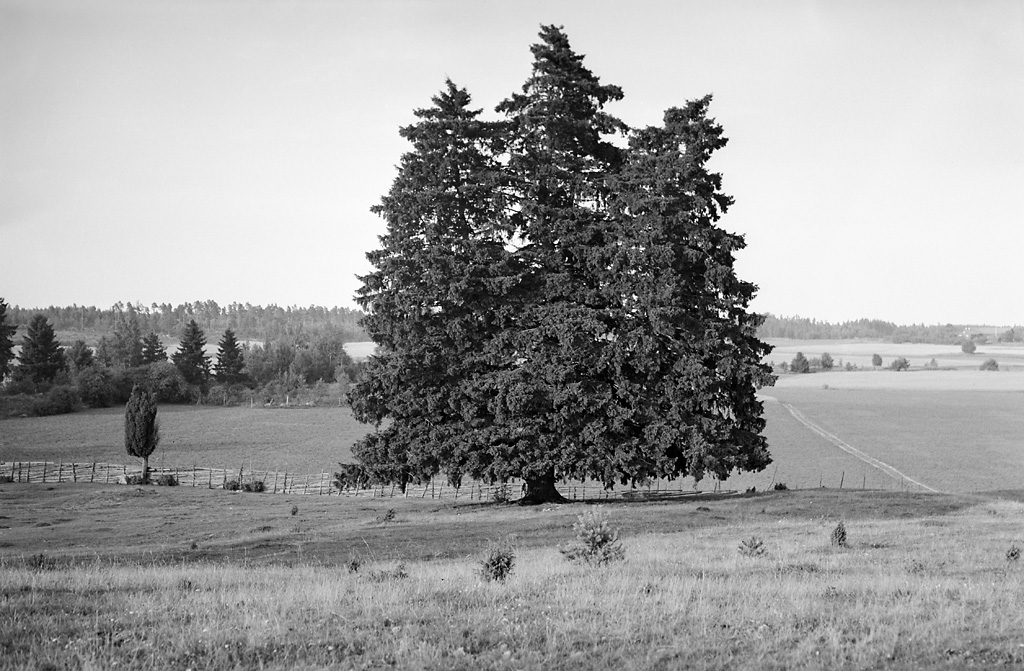
Spruce fir with three trunks at Åsa prehistoric burial ground at Selaön island

In the Heimskringla, Granmar, the king of Södermanland, was murdered on this island by Ingjald Illruler.
