= Munktorp =

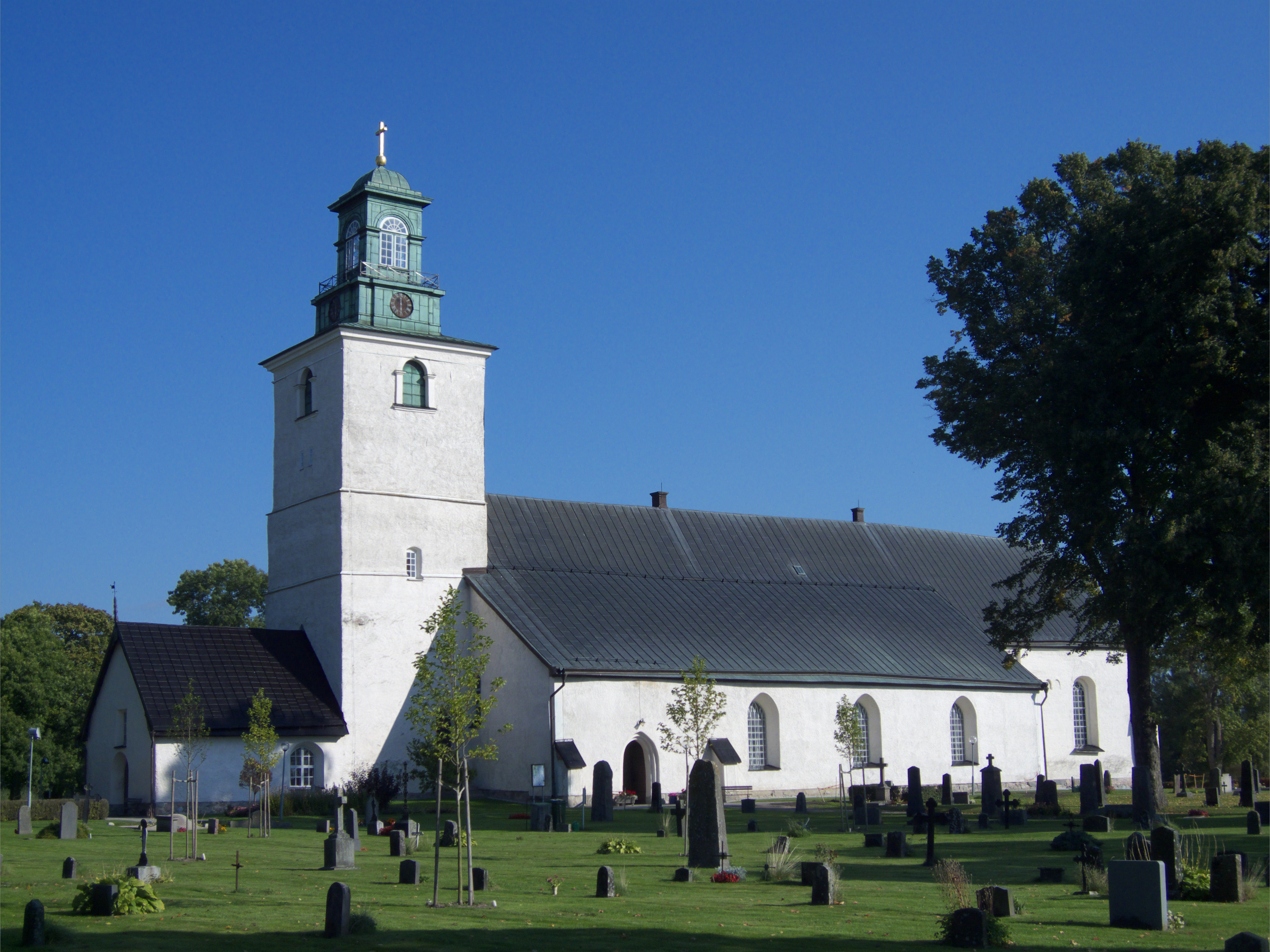
- Munktorp church

- Location within Västmanland Location within Sweden
- Coordinates: 59°32′N 16°08′E
- Country: Sweden
- Province: Västmanland
- County: Västmanland County
- Municipality: Köping Municipality

Area
  - Total: 0.83 km^{2} (0.32 sq mi)

Population (31 December 2010)
  - Total: 455
  - Density: 545/km^{2} (1,410/sq mi)
- Time zone: UTC+1 (CET)
  - Summer (DST): UTC+2 (CEST)

Munktorp is a locality situated in Köping Municipality, Västmanland County, Sweden with 455 inhabitants in 2010.

Munktorp is the site of the historic Munktorp Church (Munktorps kyrka). The church is associated with St. David of Munktorp (David av Munktorp), an Anglo-Saxon monk of the 11th century. The oldest parts of the church date back to his lifetime. Munktorp Church is seventy metres long, with a triple nave and high tower. The church contains a medieval font beaten from bronze and an ancient southern door made of oak. The ambo, a pulpit that also serves as a lectern, is incorporated into a pillar. There is also an ancient carving of St. David of Munktorp.
