= Anna Woynarowska =

Anna Woynarowska (died after 1742), was a Ukrainian noble. She was one of the greatest and most powerful of the private creditors of Charles XII of Sweden during the Great Northern War, and her claim on the Swedish state dragged on for years after the end of the war. In Sweden, she became known simply as "The Polish Countess".

== Life ==
Anna Woynarowska was the daughter of the Cossack colonel Ivan Mirovich (d. 1706) and a member of the Mirowicz family of the Ukraine. She married Andrei Stanislaus Woynarowski (1680-1740), a nephew of Ivan Mazepa and a colonel of the Ukrainian Cossacks, with whom she had the daughter Carolina Eleonora and the son Stanislaus. The Cossacks of Mazepa was allied to Charles XII of Sweden against Russia, and Mazepa had, further more, given Charles XII a considerable loan, likely from the Cossack war fund. When Ivan Mazepa died in 1709, the debt note of a half a million riksdaler which Charles XII owed to Mazepa was inherited by his nephew, Andrei Stanislaus Woynarowski.

When Andrei Stanislaus Woynarowski was taken prisoner by the Russians in 1716 and sent to Siberia, where he eventually died in captivity, he authorized Anna Woynarowska (then residing in Breslau with their children) to act as his proxy and demand payment of the debt from the Swedish king. Charles XII acknowledged the debt note as legitimate but did not pay it, and after his death in 1718, Anna Woynarowska traveled to the Swedish capital of Stockholm to demand payment from the Riksdag of the Estates. Woynarowska was but one of a very large crowd of the creditors of Charles XII demanding payment for financing the Great Northern War - it is mentioned that numerous of them arrived as late as 1731 and that their demands put a great pressure on state finances for years after the end of the war. The debt to Anna Woynarowska was however one of the largest and she became one of the most well known of these creditors. A debt of half a million was impossible for the Swedish crown to pay in the financial state after the war, and Anna Woynarowska was provided with a state allowance until the debt could be paid in full. In Sweden, Anna Woynarowska became known as "The Polish Countess" and the proceedings and negotiations between her and the Swedish state around the debt dragged on for years because of the poor state finances. Additionally, her state allowance was irregularly paid because of the near empty state treasury.

In 1725, Anna Woynarowska was given a payment of four barrows of gold as well as the Tynnelsö Castle. She sold Tynnelsö in 1742 and left Sweden.
