= Suneson =

Suneson is a surname. Notable people with the surname include:

- Carl Suneson (born 1967), Spanish golfer
- Karl Suneson (born 1975), Swedish sailor

== See also ==
- Sunesson
