= Överselö Church =

Coordinates: 59°25′08″N 17°07′52″E

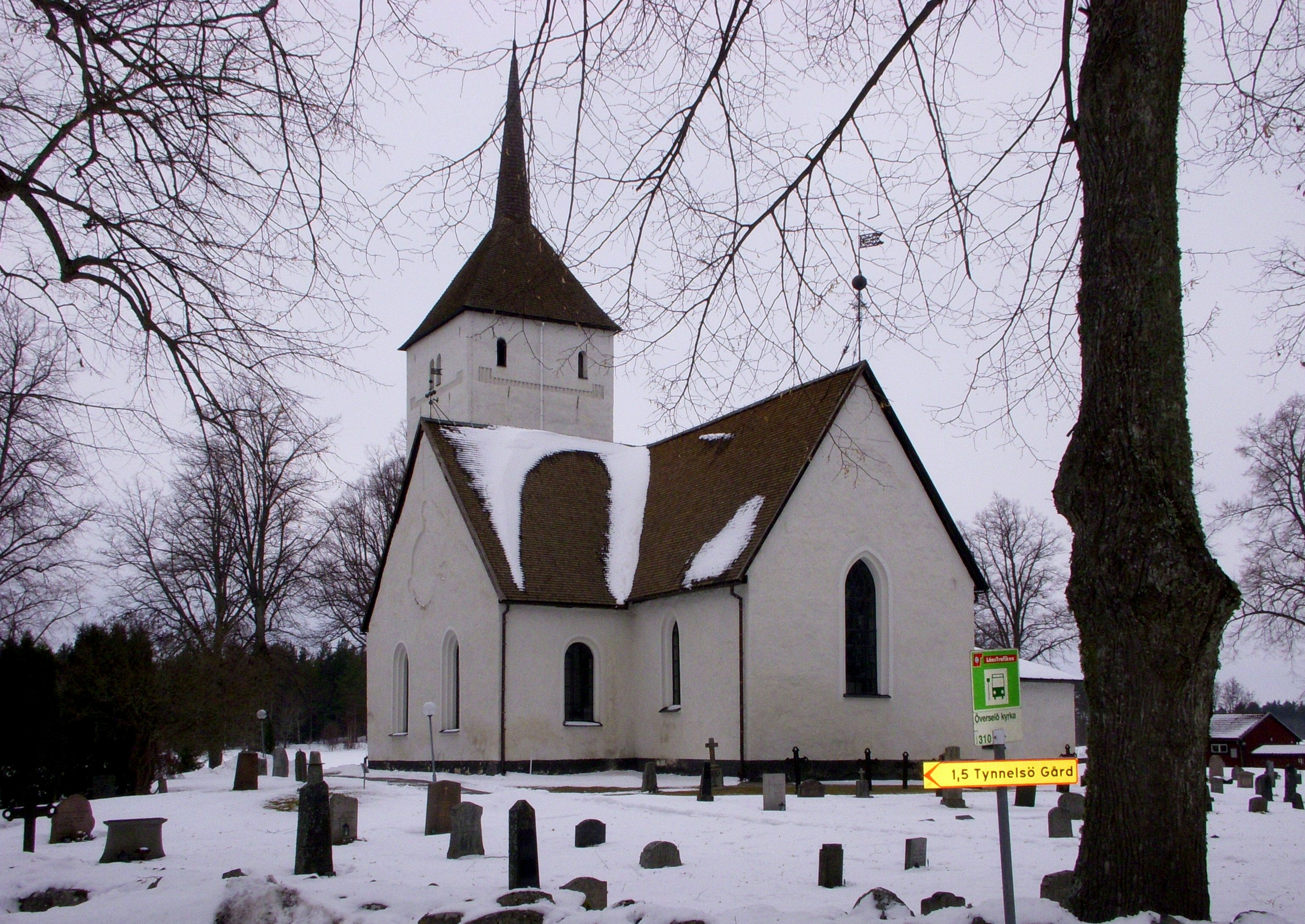
Överselö Church

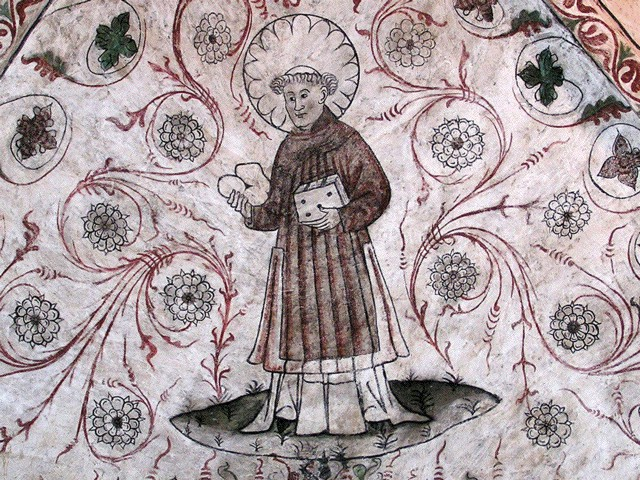
Fresco of St Stephen, Överselö Church

Överselö Church (Swedish: Överselö kyrka) is a medieval Lutheran church located on Selaön near Strängnäs in Södermanland County, Sweden. The church is noted for its Medieval artefacts and frescos. Its restoration over a two-year period was completed in 2013. It belongs to the Diocese of Strängnäs.

== History and architecture ==
Built in the Romanesque style in the 13th century, the church stands on the site of an older stave church. The many runestones on the island testify to the presence of an early community there. The church has a solid tower with limestone decorations from c. 1250.

== Interior ==
Among the church's treasures are a sculpted stone font, a wrought-iron chandelier, and the cherished Överselö Madonna carved in oak by a craftsman from Gotland. The pulpit is from the 1670s. The Gren & Stråhle organ (1754) is one of the oldest still in use.

== Frescos ==
The church is decorated by a considerable number of 15th-century frescos depicting Biblical figures and stories. The unusually well crafted paintings by artists from Mälardalen include a picture in the nave vaulting of the Trinity in which God the Father holds his Son. Other paintings depict the Apostles, Nordic saints and the symbols of the four Evangelists. The frescos in the tower room and in the south chapel are from the 17th century.

== See also ==
- Church frescos in Sweden
