= Strångsjö =

- Location within Södermanland Location within Sweden
- Coordinates: 58°54′N 16°12′E
- Country: Sweden
- Province: Södermanland
- County: Södermanland County
- Municipality: Katrineholm Municipality

Area
  - Total: 0.59 km^{2} (0.23 sq mi)

Population (31 December 2020)
  - Total: 354
  - Density: 600/km^{2} (1,600/sq mi)
- Time zone: UTC+1 (CET)
  - Summer (DST): UTC+2 (CEST)
- Climate: Dfb

Strångsjö is a locality situated in Katrineholm Municipality, Södermanland County, Sweden. As of 2010, there are 365 inhabitants.
