= Äsköping =

- Location within Södermanland Location within Sweden
- Coordinates: 59°09′N 16°04′E
- Country: Sweden
- Province: Södermanland
- County: Södermanland County
- Municipality: Katrineholm Municipality

Area
  - Total: 0.46 km^{2} (0.18 sq mi)

Population (31 December 2020)
  - Total: 332
  - Density: 720/km^{2} (1,900/sq mi)
- Time zone: UTC+1 (CET)
  - Summer (DST): UTC+2 (CEST)
- Climate: Dfb

Äsköping is a locality situated in Katrineholm Municipality, Södermanland County, Sweden with 342 inhabitants in 2010. It is the main settlement of the Julita district of the municipality and also located close to the namesake manor.

== Riksdag elections ==
Year	%	Votes	V	S	MP	C	L	KD	M	SD	NyD	Left	Right
1973	90.8	983	1.0	36.7		38.3	7.9	2.8	12.9			37.7	59.1
1976	94.1	1,014	1.0	35.7		39.9	7.4	2.6	13.4			36.7	60.7
1979	92.7	1,042	2.0	37.5		34.4	7.7	2.2	15.7			39.5	57.8
1982	92.2	1,064	2.6	38.8	2.2	29.4	5.5	2.7	18.4			41.4	53.4
1985	90.5	1,072	3.6	39.0	1.5	25.4	13.5		16.4			42.6	55.3
1988	83.7	970	3.6	37.3	5.6	23.7	10.2	5.1	14.0			46.5	47.9
1991	85.7	1,022	3.2	35.5	3.5	17.1	6.3	8.6	17.6		7.9	38.7	49.6
1994	86.9	1,081	3.7	40.1	7.6	14.7	5.4	4.7	22.1		0.8	51.3	46.9
1998	83.3	1,009	10.5	32.5	6.1	11.4	3.1	13.4	21.0			49.2	48.9
2002	80.7	977	6.2	36.3	7.9	12.6	9.5	11.4	13.6	1.3		50.5	47.1
2006	81.9	975	5.6	33.2	6.4	15.7	4.5	7.7	22.4	2.1		45.2	50.3
2010	84.6	949	5.5	28.5	6.0	14.9	4.4	6.3	27.7	6.0		39.9	53.3
2014	86.7	925	4.9	31.7	4.4	13.7	2.9	5.1	20.3	14.9		41.0	42.1
2018	86.4	935	7.3	29.3	2.2	13.8	1.7	7.7	16.9	19.3		52.6	45.6
