= Sköldinge =

- Location within Södermanland Location within Sweden
- Coordinates: 59°02′N 16°26′E
- Country: Sweden
- Province: Södermanland
- County: Södermanland County
- Municipality: Katrineholm Municipality

Area
  - Total: 1.01 km^{2} (0.39 sq mi)

Population (31 December 2020)
  - Total: 657
  - Density: 650/km^{2} (1,680/sq mi)
- Time zone: UTC+1 (CET)
  - Summer (DST): UTC+2 (CEST)
- Climate: Dfb

Sköldinge is a locality situated in Katrineholm Municipality, Södermanland County, Sweden with 604 inhabitants in 2010. From 1866 to 1967, Sköldinge was home to the active Kantorp iron mine.

== Riksdag elections ==
Year	%	Votes	V	S	MP	C	L	KD	M	SD	NyD	Left	Right
1973	93.9	1,291	2.8	45.6		33.2	6.5	1.1	10.7			48.4	50.4
1976	94.6	1,330	3.1	42.3		35.3	5.8	1.0	12.3			45.3	53.4
1979	92.7	1,334	4.1	44.2		26.5	8.2	1.5	15.3			48.4	50.0
1982	93.7	1,332	3.5	46.7	2.6	23.9	3.8	2.0	17.4			50.2	45.1
1985	92.5	1,326	3.9	46.0	2.5	21.3	9.3		16.3			49.9	46.8
1988	90.2	1,271	3.9	42.6	8.3	20.9	7.2	2.1	14.4			54.8	42.6
1991	90.4	1,331	3.9	38.7	4.9	17.7	5.8	5.8	16.2		6.5	42.6	45.4
1994	89.7	1,331	5.3	44.8	8.0	16.2	4.7	2.3	17.7		0.7	58.2	40.9
1998	85.9	1,265	8.6	38.0	9.5	10.8	2.8	9.6	18.9			56.0	42.1
2002	83.9	1,209	5.9	38.0	9.3	12.9	9.7	8.3	13.5	0.5		53.3	44.3
2006	83.6	1,223	3.9	36.2	7.4	13.2	6.8	4.6	22.0	3.8		47.5	46.5
2010	84.3	916	5.0	33.7	8.4	9.8	4.0	4.8	26.4	7.2		47.2	45.1
2014	86.3	942	5.5	31.2	5.7	11.3	2.4	3.6	17.4	19.7		42.5	34.7
2018	87.6	921	7.3	26.2	4.7	11.3	3.3	5.4	16.0	25.1		49.4	49.7
