= Köping Municipality =

Köping Municipality Köpings kommun
- Municipality
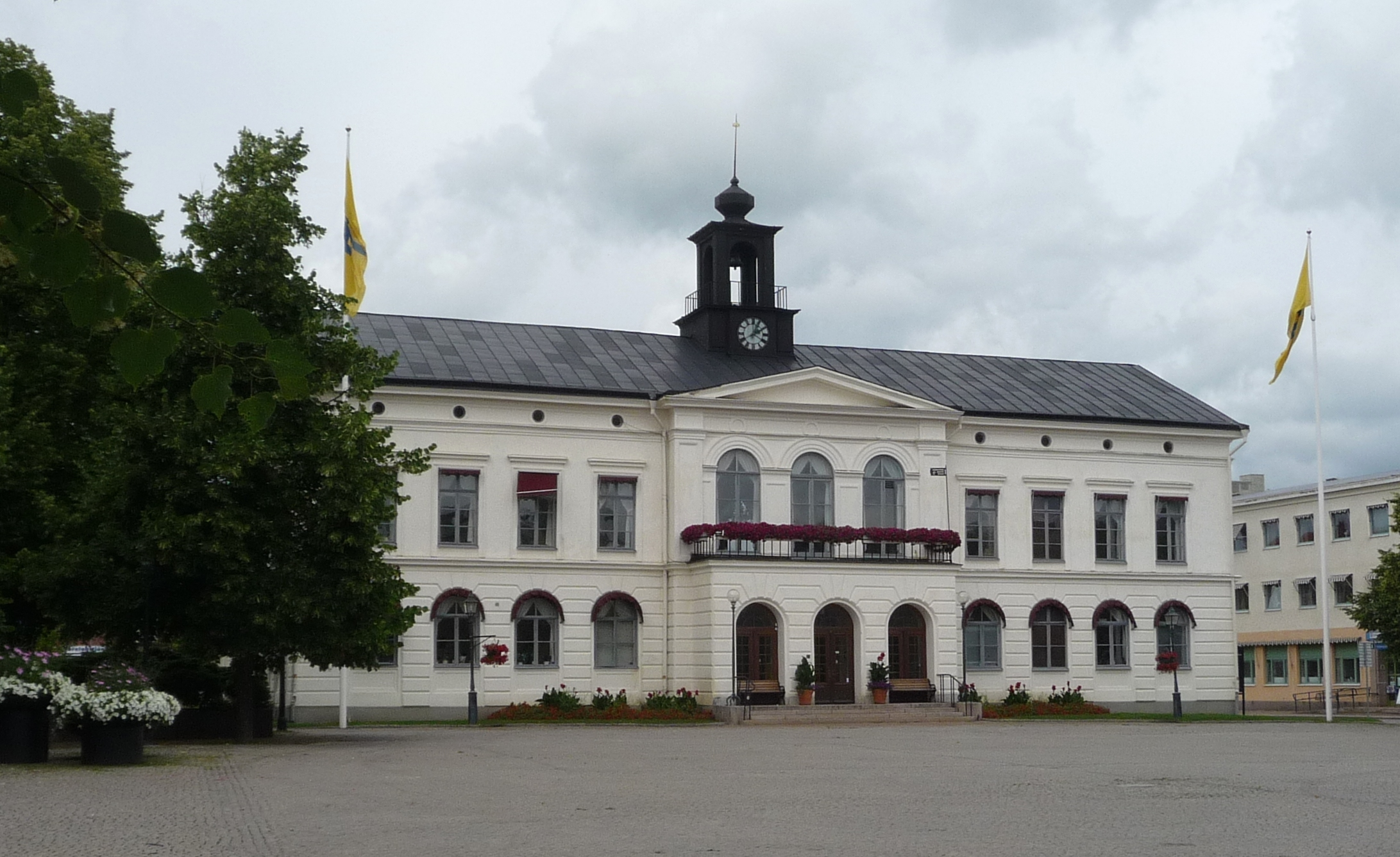
- Köping Town Hall

- Flag Coat of arms

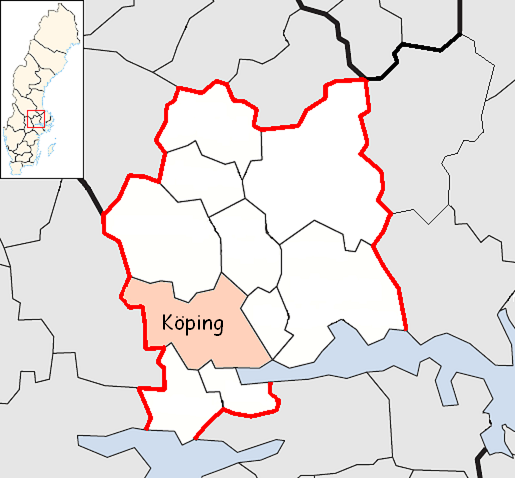
- Coordinates: 59°31′N 15°59′E
- Country: Sweden
- County: Västmanland County
- Seat: Köping

Area
  - Total: 644.79 km^{2} (248.95 sq mi)
  - Land: 604.55 km^{2} (233.42 sq mi)
  - Water: 40.24 km^{2} (15.54 sq mi)
- Area as of 1 January 2014.

Population (30 June 2025)
  - Total: 25,662
  - Density: 42.448/km^{2} (109.94/sq mi)
- Time zone: UTC+1 (CET)
  - Summer (DST): UTC+2 (CEST)
- ISO 3166 code: SE
- Province: Västmanland
- Municipal code: 1983
- Website: www.koping.se

Köping Municipality (Swedish: Köpings kommun) is a municipality in Västmanland County in central Sweden. Its seat is located in the city of Köping.

The municipality was created in 1971, when the former City of Köping was merged with the municipalities of Kolsva, Medåker and Munktorp forming a new municipality of unitary type.

== Localities ==
- Kolsva
- Munktorp
- Köping (seat)

== Demographics ==
This is a demographic table based on Köping Municipality's electoral districts in the 2022 Swedish general election sourced from SVT's election platform, in turn taken from SCB official statistics.

In total there were 26,115 residents, including 19,584 Swedish citizens of voting age. 46.0% voted for the left coalition and 53.0% for the right coalition. Indicators are in percentage points except population totals and income.

Location	Residents	Citizen adults	Left vote	Right vote	Employed	Swedish parents	Foreign heritage	Income SEK	Degree
Location			%	%					
Byjorden-Odensvi	2,240	1,712	43.3	54.6	73	71	29	22,353	25
Elund-Ållesta	2,134	1,603	40.2	59.6	89	85	15	30,421	39
Hästhagen	2,008	1,560	40.7	58.0	89	83	17	29,045	39
Karlberg	1,852	1,417	41.4	57.5	74	74	26	25,384	29
Karlsdal	1,859	1,460	49.8	49.0	73	63	37	22,020	27
Kolsva V	1,933	1,521	42.8	55.8	78	82	18	23,332	30
Kolsva Ö	1,601	1,177	39.6	59.7	79	78	22	24,366	24
Munktorp	1,821	1,431	42.4	56.9	88	91	9	28,198	35
Nyckelberget	1,955	1,431	47.9	51.2	75	64	36	23,605	36
Nygård-Skogsbrynet	1,851	1,004	73.8	24.7	56	27	73	15,334	14
Skogsborg	1,682	1,247	49.5	49.4	75	59	41	22,569	29
Tunadal	1,826	1,426	53.1	45.8	67	65	35	18,458	25
Ullvi	1,450	1,139	45.2	54.4	87	68	32	28,750	33
Östanås	1,903	1,456	47.0	52.2	81	74	26	24,463	30
Source: SVT

== Riksdag elections ==
Year	%	Votes	V	S	MP	C	L	KD	M	SD	NyD	Left	Right
1973	90.5	16,091	5.3	54.1		23.6	6.7	2.2	7.3			59.5	37.5
1976	91.7	16,913	4.0	53.5		23.1	8.2	1.8	8.8			57.5	40.2
1979	90.3	16,811	5.6	54.3		17.5	8.3	1.6	12.0			59.8	37.8
1982	91.6	17,217	5.8	56.5	1.2	15.1	4.7	1.9	14.5			62.4	34.3
1985	88.7	16,986	6.0	55.1	1.2	12.3	10.5		13.0			61.1	35.8
1988	84.4	16,156	6.9	52.5	4.8	10.7	9.9	2.6	10.8			64.2	31.4
1991	84.9	16,164	5.5	48.5	2.7	8.1	7.5	6.7	14.7		5.9	54.1	37.0
1994	86.0	16,328	8.5	54.1	5.4	8.9	6.0	2.8	15.4		0.9	66.5	31.1
1998	79.3	14,575	16.2	44.1	3.5	5.6	3.2	9.6	16.0			63.8	34.4
2002	77.3	14,046	9.9	48.8	3.3	7.0	10.3	6.8	11.0	0.9		62.0	35.1
2006	78.9	14,556	6.6	45.1	3.3	8.6	5.6	5.0	19.9	3.4		55.1	39.1
2010	82.6	15,546	6.8	41.0	5.1	6.4	5.4	3.9	23.5	7.0		52.8	39.1
2014	83.9	15,938	5.6	40.7	4.0	6.0	3.7	3.1	17.4	17.4		50.2	30.3
2018	85.9	16,390	6.4	34.6	2.3	6.7	3.3	5.9	15.6	23.9		50.0	48.8

== See also ==
- Köping (concept)
