= Bie, Sweden =

Bie
- Location within Södermanland Location within Sweden
- Coordinates: 59°05′N 16°12′E
- Country: Sweden
- Province: Södermanland
- County: Södermanland County
- Municipality: Katrineholm Municipality

Area
  - Total: 0.62 km^{2} (0.24 sq mi)

Population (31 December 2010)
  - Total: 528
  - Density: 858/km^{2} (2,220/sq mi)
- Time zone: UTC+1 (CET)
  - Summer (DST): UTC+2 (CEST)
- Climate: Dfb

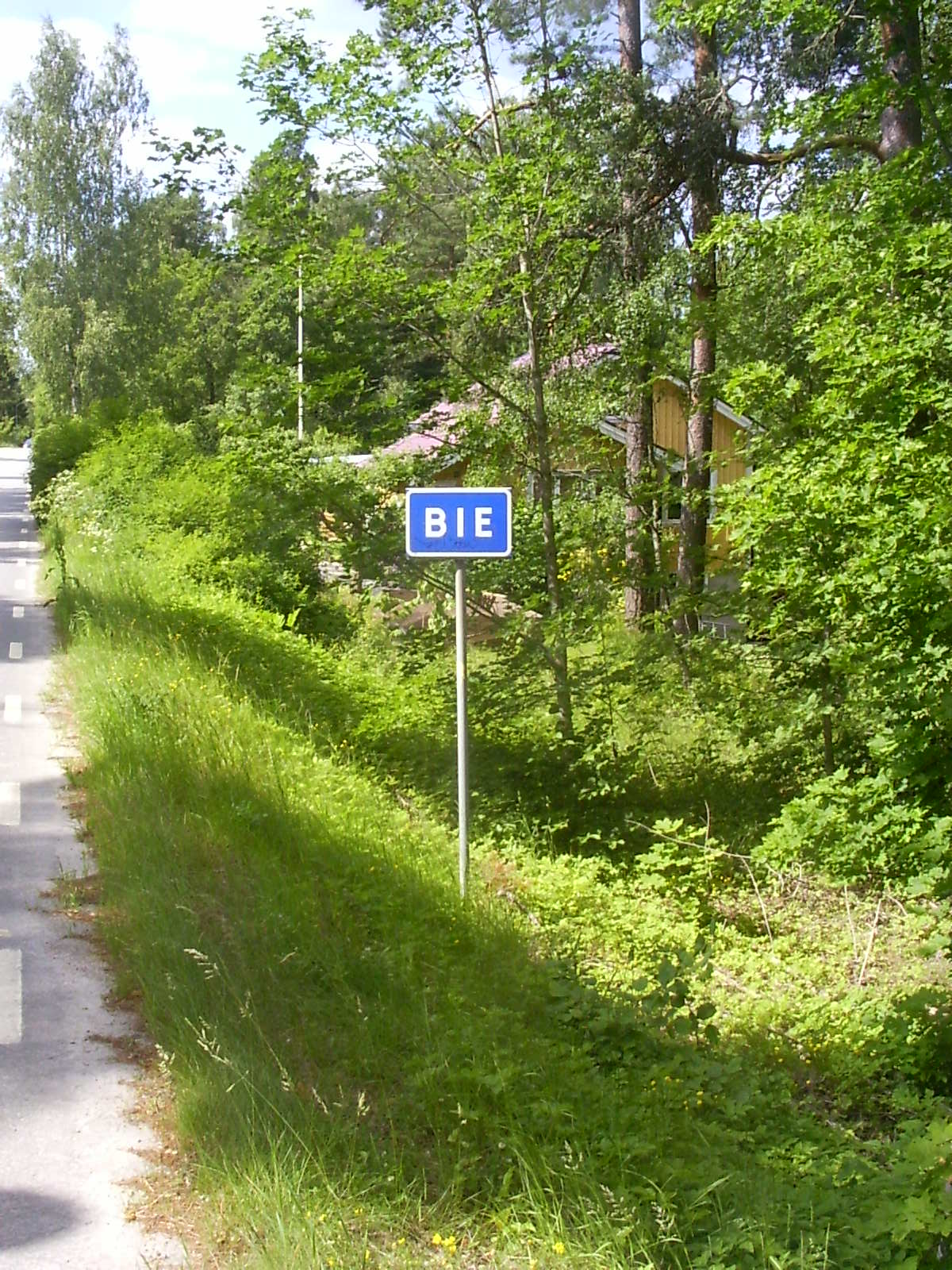
Entrance to Bie village in Katrineholm Municipality.

Bie is a locality situated in Katrineholm Municipality, Södermanland County, Sweden with 528 inhabitants in 2010.
