= Julita Abbey =

Medieval Cisterian monastery in Södermanland, Sweden

Coordinates: 59°08′58.06″N 16°02′28.61″E

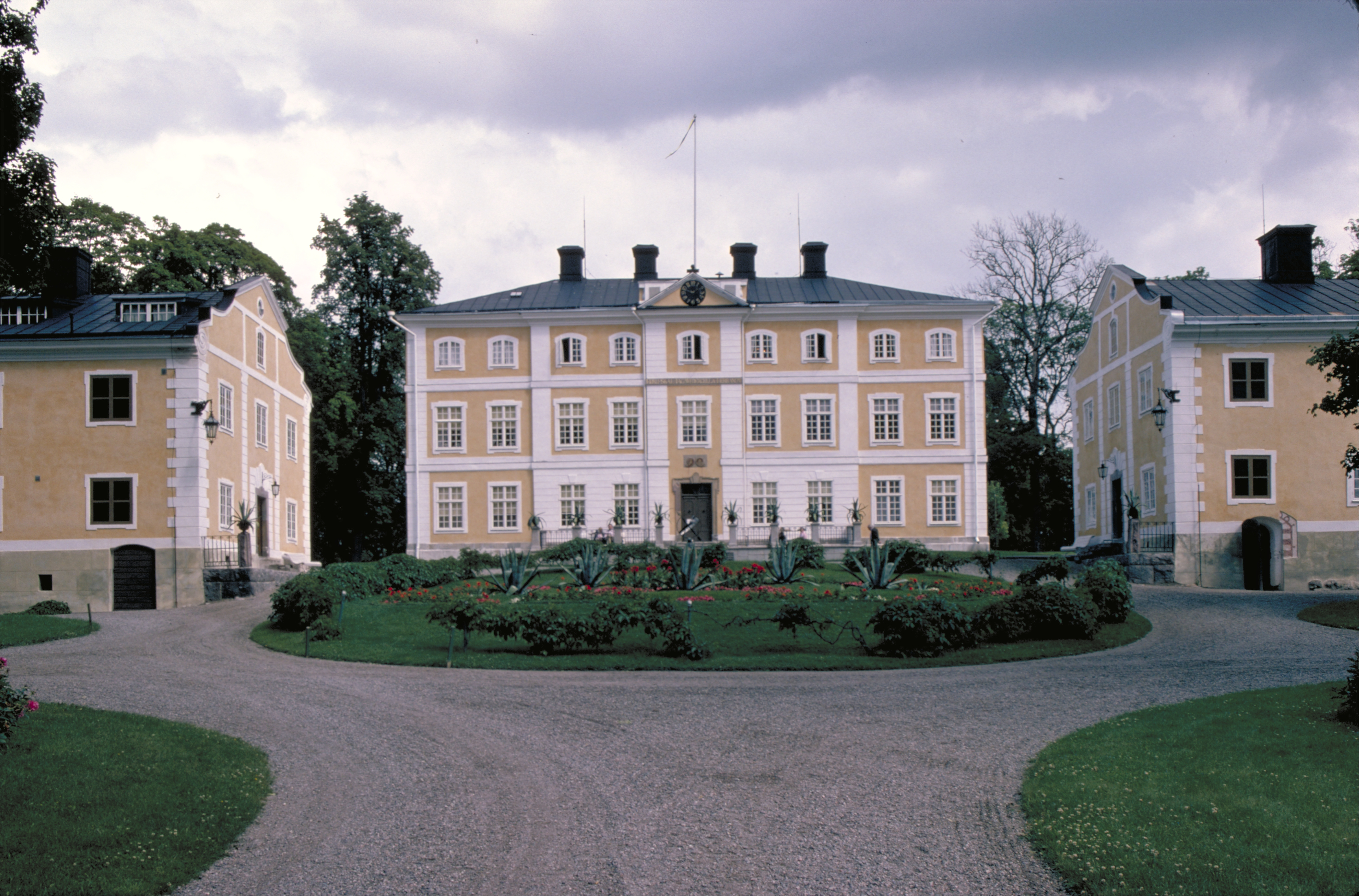
One of the few visible remains of the abbey are now incorporated in the basement of the right wing of Julita Manor

Julita Abbey (Julita kloster) was a monastery of the Cistercian monks in the parish of Julita in Oppunda Hundred, Södermanland, Sweden.

== History ==
The monastery was founded in 1160 at Viby, close to Sigtuna, but under the patronage of King Knut Eriksson (ca 1150 – died 1195) who donated land and a right to parts of the fishing at Älvkarleby. It was relocated in 1180 to Säby by the lake Öljaren in Julita. The monastery was therefore also known as Säby, or Saba in Latin. It continued to receive rich donations from King Erik Knutsson (1210–1216), and later from other members of the aristocracy and royal circles. It was finally the owner of some 80 farms, mostly in Södermanland.

At the time of the Protestant Reformation, King Gustavus Vasa appropriated the abbey in accordance with the Reduction of Gustav I of Sweden and gave it in fief to Olof Arvidsson, a bailiff in Nyköping, in 1527. The secular estate thus created later had various possessors, including diplomat Matthias Palbitzki and members of the Lewenhaupt family.

In 1944, the Nordic Museum assumed the ownership of the estate in accordance with the will of the last private owner, Arthur Bäckström (1861–1941). The manor is now a large open-air museum, incorporating a small part of the abbey in the basement of one of its wings, which is open to the public. Together with another small building originally located outside the cloisters, this is all that can be seen of the abbey today, though archaeological excavations have revealed the full extent of the main abbey buildings.

== Other sources ==
- Ralph Edenheim and Hans A. Lidén (1978) Julita kloster. Royal Swedish Academy of Letters, History and Antiquities (Stockholm : Almqvist & Wiksell International) ISBN 91-7402-062-5
