= Valla, Sweden =

Valla
- Location within Södermanland Location within Sweden
- Coordinates: 59°01′N 16°23′E
- Country: Sweden
- Province: Södermanland
- County: Södermanland County
- Municipality: Katrineholm Municipality

Area
  - Total: 1.33 km^{2} (0.51 sq mi)

Population (31 December 2010)
  - Total: 1,517
  - Density: 1,137/km^{2} (2,940/sq mi)
- Time zone: UTC+1 (CET)
  - Summer (DST): UTC+2 (CEST)
- Climate: Dfb

Valla is a locality in Katrineholm Municipality, Södermanland County, Sweden with a population of 1,517 inhabitants as of 2010.
