= Katrineholm Municipality =

Katrineholm Municipality Katrineholms kommun
- Municipality
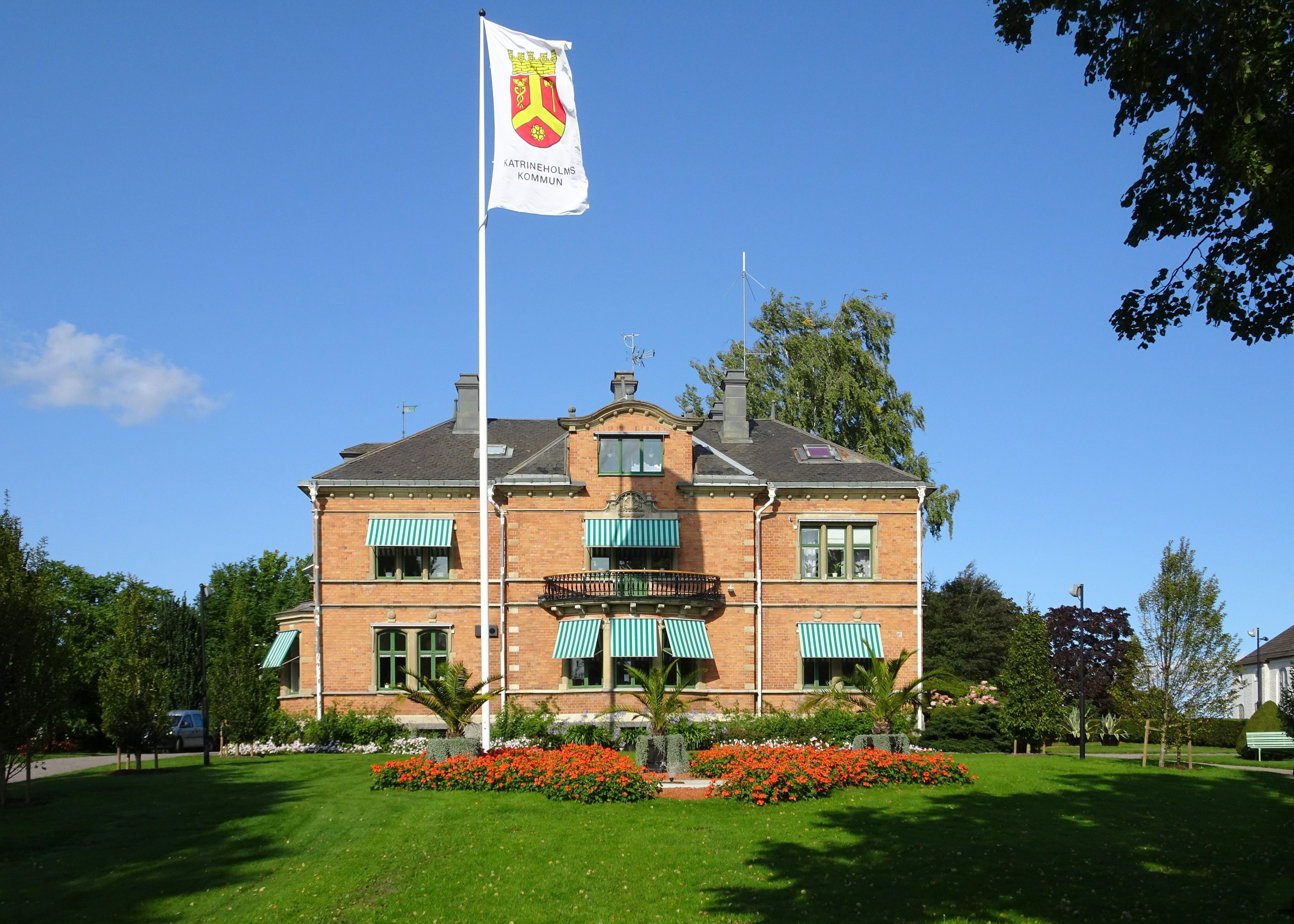
- Katrineholm town hall

- Coat of arms

- Coordinates: 59°00′N 16°12′E
- Country: Sweden
- County: Södermanland County
- Seat: Katrineholm

Area
  - Total: 1,189.54 km^{2} (459.28 sq mi)
  - Land: 1,020.19 km^{2} (393.90 sq mi)
  - Water: 169.35 km^{2} (65.39 sq mi)
- Area as of 1 January 2014.

Population (30 June 2025)
  - Total: 34,173
  - Density: 33.497/km^{2} (86.756/sq mi)
- Time zone: UTC+1 (CET)
  - Summer (DST): UTC+2 (CEST)
- ISO 3166 code: SE
- Province: Södermanland
- Municipal code: 0483
- Website: www.katrineholm.se

Katrineholm Municipality (Swedish: Katrineholms kommun) is a municipality in Södermanland County in southeast Sweden. Its seat is located in the city of Katrineholm.

The present municipality was created in 1971, when the City of Katrineholm (instituted in 1917) was amalgamated with surrounding rural municipalities.

The thirty-first Swedish Prime Minister Göran Persson, while originally from the neighboring municipality of Vingåker, was once the municipal chairman (mayor) of Katrineholm.

== Geography ==
- Aspen (Julita) lake

== Localities ==
- Bie
- Björkvik
- Flodafors
- Forssjö
- Katrineholm (seat)
- Sköldinge
- Strångsjö
- Valla
- Äsköping

== Elections ==
=== Riksdag ===
These are the results of the Riksdag elections in Katrineholm Municipality since the 1972 municipal reform. The results of the Sweden Democrats were not published at a municipal level from between 1988 and 1998 by SCB because of the party's small size nationwide at the time.

Year	Turnout	Votes	V	S	MP	C	L	KD	M	SD	ND
1973	92.5	21,323	2.3	52.2	0.0	23.6	8.9	2.4	10.3	0.0	0.0
1976	93.0	22,037	2.0	51.1	0.0	24.2	9.2	1.8	11.4	0.0	0.0
1979	92.3	21,866	3.1	52.2	0.0	17.5	10.5	1.7	14.5	0.0	0.0
1982	92.8	22,002	3.4	54.7	1.7	15.2	5.6	2.3	16.9	0.0	0.0
1985	91.2	21,821	3.7	53.3	1.3	12.7	12.1	0.0	15.4	0.0	0.0
1988	87.8	20,798	4.2	52.8	5.0	11.4	11.3	2.3	12.7	0.0	0.0
1991	88.3	21,255	3.5	47.8	3.1	9.4	8.3	6.7	15.5	0.0	4.9
1994	88.1	21,455	4.7	54.2	5.9	7.6	6.4	3.3	16.5	0.0	0.5
1998	83.5	20,002	9.8	47.4	5.4	5.5	4.0	9.6	16.4	0.0	0.0
2002	81.2	19,543	5.5	52.6	5.0	5.9	9.8	7.7	10.9	1.2	0.0
2006	82.3	20,023	4.3	48.0	5.2	6.7	7.2	5.7	19.1	2.4	0.0
2010	84.7	20,708	4.6	38.4	7.6	6.3	6.8	4.3	25.0	6.3	0.0
2014	86.0	21,351	4.7	39.5	6.0	6.5	4.2	3.5	19.0	14.3	0.0

Blocs

This lists the relative strength of the socialist and centre-right blocs since 1973, but parties not elected to the Riksdag are inserted as "other", including the Sweden Democrats results from 1988 to 2006, but also the Christian Democrats pre-1991 and the Greens in 1982, 1985 and 1991. The sources are identical to the table above. The coalition or government mandate marked in bold formed the government after the election. New Democracy got elected in 1991 but are still listed as "other" due to the short lifespan of the party. "Elected" is the total number of percentage points from the municipality that went to parties who were elected to the Riksdag.

Year	Turnout	Votes	Left	Right	SD	Other	Elected
1973	92.5	21,323	**54.5**	42.8	0.0	2.7	97.3
1976	93.0	22,037	53.1	**44.8**	0.0	2.1	97.9
1979	92.3	21,866	55.3	**42.5**	0.0	2.2	97.8
1982	92.8	22,002	**58.1**	37.7	0.0	4.2	95.8
1985	91.2	21,821	**57.0**	40.2	0.0	2.8	97.2
1988	87.8	20,798	**62.0**	35.4	0.0	2.6	97.4
1991	88.3	21,255	51.3	**39.9**	0.0	8.8	96.1
1994	88.1	21,455	**64.8**	33.8	0.0	1.4	98.6
1998	83.5	20,002	**62.6**	35.5	0.0	1.9	98.1
2002	81.2	19,543	**63.1**	34.3	0.0	2.6	97.4
2006	82.3	20,023	57.5	**38.7**	0.0	3.8	96.2
2010	84.7	20,708	50.6	**42.4**	6.3	0.7	99.3
2014	86.0	21,351	**50.2**	33.2	14.3	2.3	97.7

== Demographics ==
This is a demographic table based on Katrineholm Municipality's electoral districts in the 2022 Swedish general election sourced from SVT's election platform, in turn taken from SCB official statistics.

In total there were 34,714 residents, of whom 25,962 were Swedish citizens of voting age. 52.3% voted for the left coalition and 46.4% for the right coalition. Indicators are in percentage points except population totals and income.

Location	Residents	Citizen adults	Left vote	Right vote	Employed	Swedish parents	Foreign heritage	Income SEK	Degree
Location			%	%					
Bie	1,618	1,268	44.6	54.5	84	91	9	25,798	33
Björkvik	1,469	1,188	43.8	55.5	84	92	8	24,379	33
Centrum	2,250	1,680	53.1	46.0	77	73	27	21,495	26
Duveholm	1,471	1,144	49.9	48.8	90	89	11	29,337	47
Forssjö	1,658	1,257	42.3	56.8	87	91	9	27,638	33
Gamla Vattentornet	1,586	1,139	55.1	43.5	69	58	42	20,018	25
Julita	1,304	1,085	49.2	49.6	85	90	10	23,784	31
Järven	2,318	1,770	58.9	39.9	66	64	36	18,332	29
Laggarhult	2,337	1,817	50.6	48.5	90	88	12	28,865	42
Linnéan	1,752	1,246	56.1	42.5	70	64	36	19,915	26
Lövåsen	1,671	1,149	58.4	40.2	74	64	36	24,457	32
Norr City	1,736	1,241	56.9	41.7	71	55	45	20,696	25
Nyhem	1,916	1,131	64.0	34.3	59	46	54	18,612	21
Nävertorp	1,670	1,016	64.7	34.2	61	40	60	18,003	21
Oppunda	1,809	1,467	54.1	45.0	86	85	15	26,930	38
Skogsborg	1,740	1,355	53.3	45.1	81	77	23	25,859	34
Sköldinge-Floda	1,314	1,069	47.9	50.5	79	87	13	24,414	32
Strandvägsområdet	1,554	1,161	56.9	41.9	66	58	42	20,212	30
Valla	1,966	1,504	46.5	52.5	79	84	16	25,255	26
Värmbol	1,575	1,275	49.1	50.3	85	89	11	30,075	42
Source: SVT
