= Thomas Simonsson =

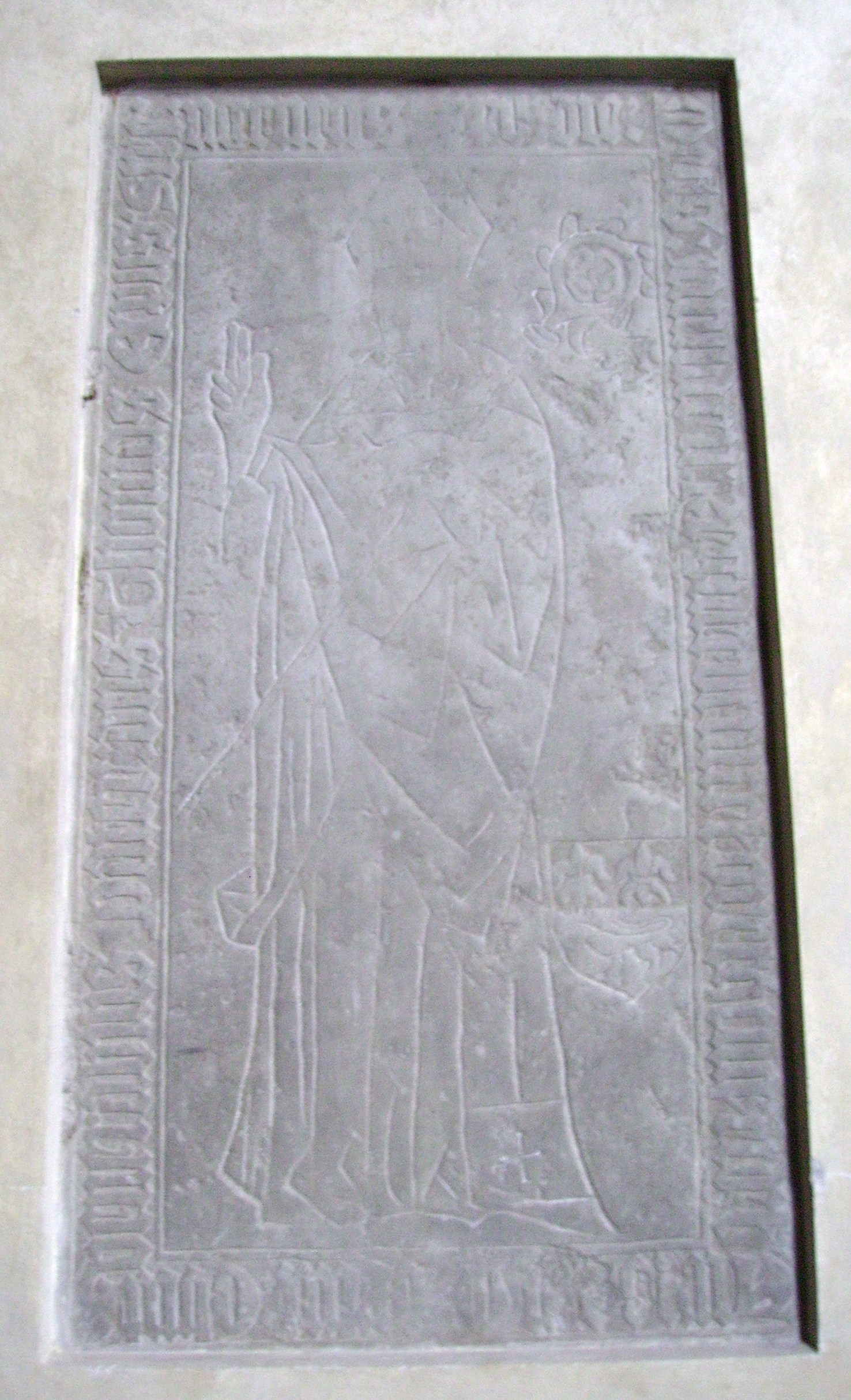
Tomb of Bishop Thomas in Strängnäs Cathedral

Thomas Simonsson (c. 1380 – January 28, 1443) was a Swedish theologian and poet who served as the Bishop of the Diocese of Strängnäs 1429 – 1443. He was the author of the poem Engelbrektsvisan (1439) which included the stanzas known as Biskop Thomas Frihetsvisan. The poem is part of a chronicle play about Engelbrekt Engelbrektsson.

He became canon in the diocese of Strängnäs in 1405 and studied liberal arts and canon law at the universities in Paris and Leipzig. He was one of the executors of the will of Queen Philippa who died during 1430. In 1432 he was nominated Archbishop of Uppsala by King Eric of Pomerania, following the death of archbishop Johan Håkansson died. However the chapter elected Olaus Laurentii to be the new archbishop against the King's volition. Thomas Simonsson died in 1443 and was interred in Strängnäs Cathedral.
