= Botvid Sunesson =

Swedish bishop (died 1562)

The Right Reverend Botvid Sunesson
- Bishop of Strängnäs
- Church: Church of Sweden
- Diocese: Strängnäs
- In office: 1536–1555; 1561–1562
- Predecessor: Magnus Sommar (1st); Ericus Nicolai Swart (2nd)
- Successor: Ericus Nicolai Swart (1st); Nicolaus Olaui (2nd)

Orders
- Consecration: 2 October 1536 by Laurentius Petri Nericius

Personal details
- Died: 1562
- Denomination: Lutheran
- Spouse: Elin
- Children: 1

Botvid Sunesson (died 1562) was a Swedish prelate who served as the Bishop of Strängnäs from 1536 till 1555 and again from 1561 till 1562.

== Biography ==
He was appointed Bishop of Strängnäs in 1536 after studying in for a master's degree in Wittenberg, possibly with Olaus Petri. He was a canon in Linköping Cathedral. Upon his appointment as bishop, he was the first Bishop of Strängnäs aligned with the Lutheranism. Botvid Sunesson opposed King Gustav's marriage to Catherine Stenbock and was consequently deposed from his bishopric and kept prisoner at Gripsholm Castle. In 1561 Botvid Sunesson was reinstated as bishop but he died a year later.
