= Öljaren =

Lake in Vingåker Municipality, Sweden

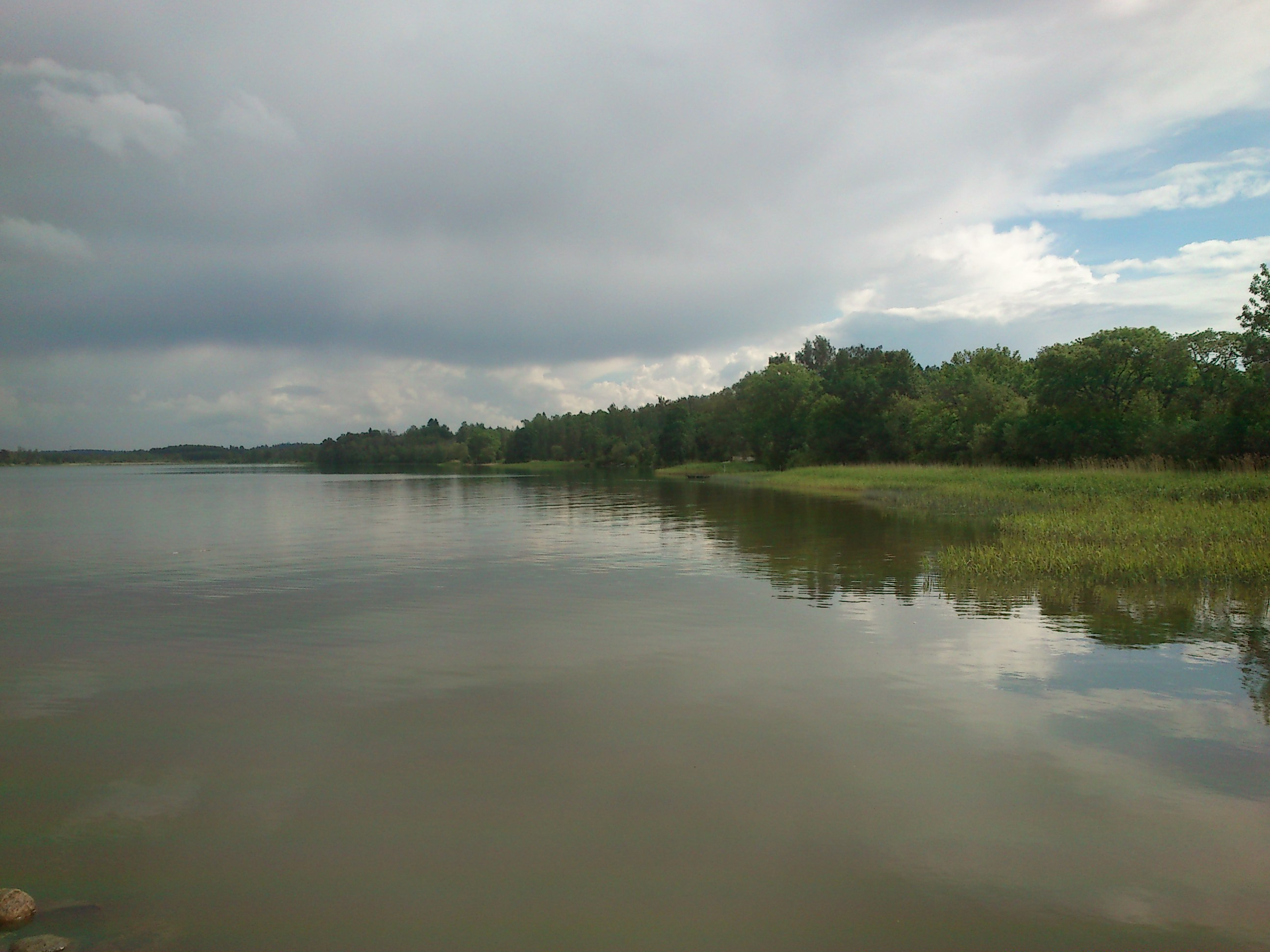
- The lake from the south

- Location within Södermanland Location within Sweden
- Coordinates: 59°08′N 16°02′E
- Basin countries: Sweden

Öljaren (Swedish pronunciation: [ˈœ̂lːjarɛn, ˈœ̂lːjaɳ]) is a lake in Södermanland, Sweden.
