= Saint Botvid =

12th century Christian missionary and saint

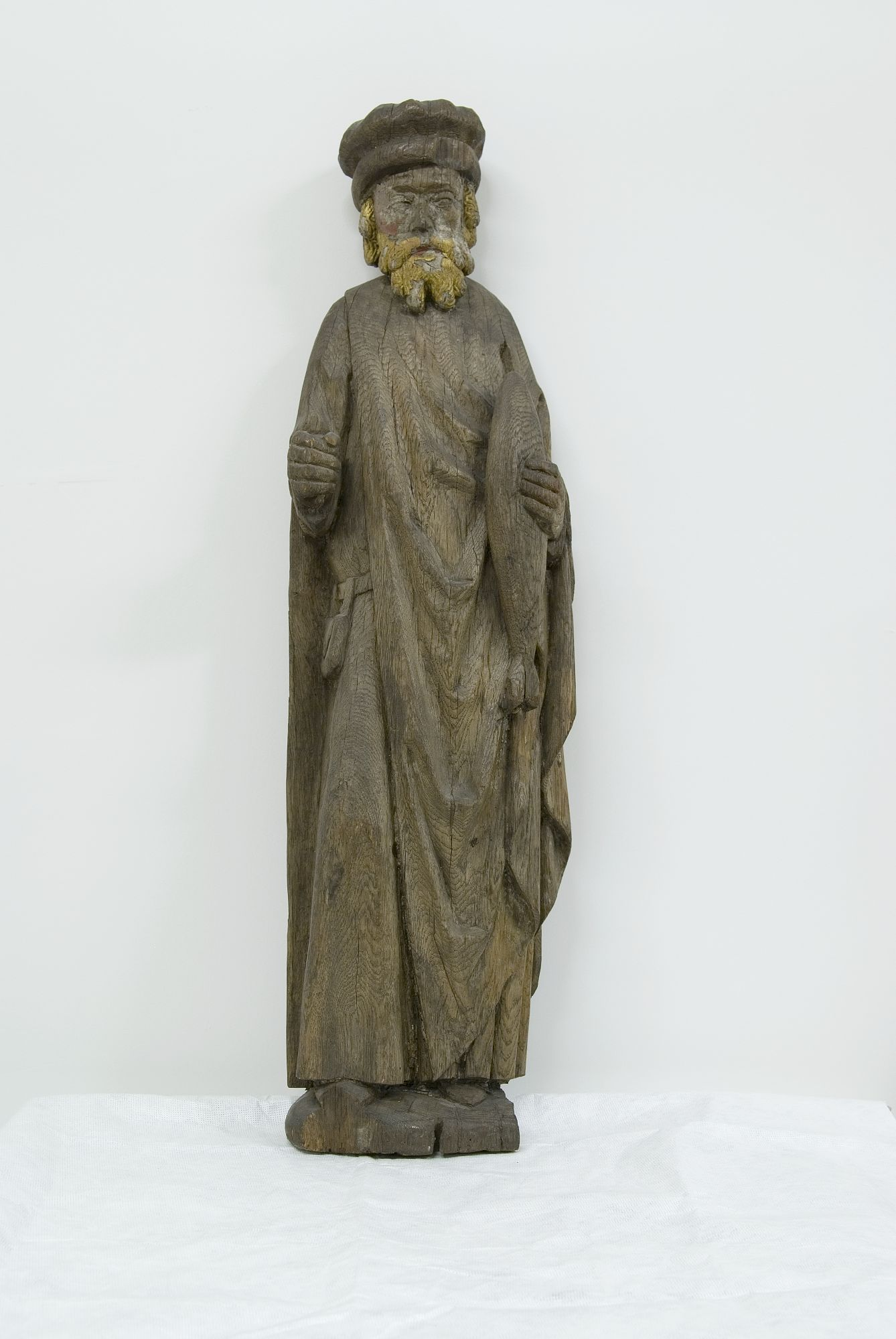
- Saint Botvid

Martyr
- Born: Södermanland, Sweden
- Died: c. 1100; Södermanland, Sweden
- Major shrine: Salem, Sweden
- Feast: 28 July

Saint Botvid was a Christian missionary in Sweden during the 11th century.

== Biography ==
Botvid, who was born in Södermanland, Sweden, went on a trade trip to England where he came into contact with Christianity and was converted to the Catholic faith. Botvid was sent back as a missionary to Sweden by Saint Sigfrid of Växjö along with Saint David and Saint Eskil. The missionaries preached chiefly in Södermanland and Västmanland, in the area of Lake Mälaren. According to legend, Botvid was killed with an axe while boating near Rågö in the archipelago of Södermanland. Botvid was buried in Salem Church (Salems kyrka) around the year 1100 which led to the church becoming a pilgrimage church.

== Legacy ==
Saint Botvid is shown on the seal and coat of arms of Botkyrka Municipality, where he carries an axe and a fish. Botkyrka is Swedish and short for "Botvid's Church". Saint Botvid is one of the guardian saints of Södermanland along with Saint Eskil who had his base in the city of Eskilstuna in eastern Södermanland.

== Saint Botvid's Spring ==
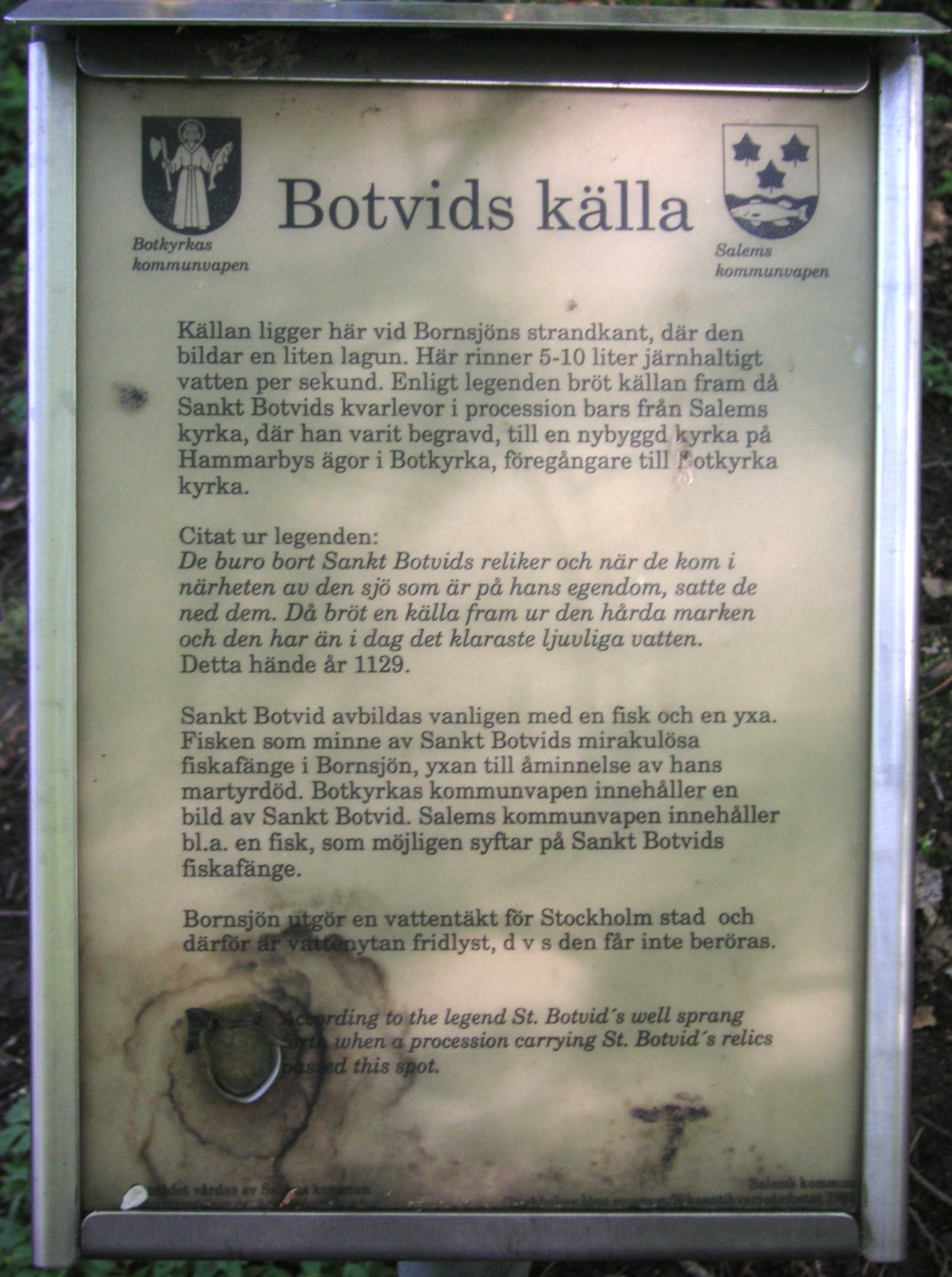
Notice at Saint Botvid's Spring near Lake Bornsjön

Saint Botvid is associated with Saint Botvid's Spring (Sankt Botvids källa), an artesian spring where the water flows out under its own pressure. The spring is located at the southeastern tip of Lake Bornsjöns in Salem Municipality (Salems kommun) in Stockholm County.

In a medieval tradition, a spring would always be found in connection to the death of a saint. According to legend, when the remains of Saint Botvid were transported to the church in today's Botkyrka, the casket was temporarily put down near the shore of Lake Bornsjön, where a spring welled up. It continues to provide clear water to this day.
