= Diocese of Strängnäs =

Diocese of the Church of Sweden

Diocese of Strängnäs Diocesis Stregnensis Strängnäs stift
- Arms of the diocese of Strängnäs

- Flag

Location
- Country: Sweden
- Deaneries: 9 kontrakt
- Coordinates: 59°22′32″N 17°02′04″E

Statistics
- Parishes: 62
- Congregations: 73

Information
- Denomination: Church of Sweden
- Established: around 1100
- Cathedral: Strängnäs Cathedral

Current leadership
- Bishop: Johan Dalman

Map

Website
- svenskakyrkan.se/strangnasstift

The Diocese of Strängnäs (Swedish: Strängnäs stift) is a part of the Lutheran Church of Sweden and has its seat in Strängnäs Cathedral in Strängnäs, south of Lake Mälaren. The diocese is made up of the two provinces Närke and Södermanland (except for eastern Södermanland, which belongs to Stockholm County and the Diocese of Stockholm).

The diocese was first a Latin Catholic suffragan of the then Danish Diocese of Lund, which in 1104 was elevated to an archdiocese and became the Metropolitan see of all of Scandinavia. From 1164 on Strängnäs was suffragan to the Swedish archbishop of Uppsala. It was established during the 12th century by the English missionary Saint Eskil.

== Catholic Diocese ==
=== Missionary Antecedents ===
In 829 Ansgar and his companion, Witmar, having reached Björkö (Birka), an island in Lake Mälaren and a great centre of trade, were well received and made many converts. Returning to Germany in 831, Ansgar was made first Archbishop of Hamburg by Gregory IV and given a share in the superintendence of the Northern Mission hitherto exercised by Ebbo, Archbishop of Reims. Ebbo's relative Gautbert (Simon) became archbishop of Sweden and built a church at Birka. This success incurred the enmity of the heathen Swedes, who drove him from the country in 837, and slew his relative Nithard. Ansgar sent Ardgeir to Sweden in 844, but he did not stay long. Ansgar revisited Björkö in 853, when a law tolerating Christianity was passed, and until 865 Rimbert, Ansgar's biographer and successor, and other missionaries worked there. In 936 Hamburg-Bremen's Archbishop Unni visited Björkö and died there. In 1066 the city was utterly destroyed.

=== Pre-Reformation bishops ===
Late legend has it that Saint Eskil, an English bishop, disturbed a heathen sacrifice held at Strängnäs by king Blot-Sweyn and was killed. Saint Botvid, a native layman converted in England, continued the preaching of Christianity until his murder on 28 July 1120 by a Slavonic captive whom he had redeemed. About this time Ragnhild, wife of King Inge II, died and was buried at Södertälje, of which town she became the patron saint. In 1152 the limits of the diocese of Strängnäs were determined at an assembly at Linköping. The first bishop was Gerder (1129–59), who founded a school at the Cluniac monastery of Strängnäs.

He was succeeded by Bishop William (1160–1208). In 1160 the Cistercian abbey of Juleta was founded. In 1165 Närke (Nerike) was added to the diocese. About this time the building of Strängnäs Cathedral was begun. In 1176 or 1179 the new stone church at Botkyrka was consecrated by Bishop William and Stefan, Archbishop of Uppsala; the relics of Botvid were translated to it. A hospital of St. John of Jerusalem was built over the grave of Saint Eskil, and was restored in 1255. Bishop Olaf or Ulf Bonde (1208–24), called Basatömer, a nephew of King Saint Eric, was transferred to Upsala.

The see lay vacant for nine years, but in 1233 Bishop Trogil was elected. About this time the Cistercian nunnery of Vårfruberga (Latin: Mons Mariae) on the island of Fogdö and in 1234 the Franciscan priory at Nykoping were founded. About 1250 Frogil was succeeded by Kol, who resigned in 1257 and was succeeded by Bishop Finved (1257–75). About 1268 the Dominican priory at Strängnäs was founded. In 1291 Bishop Annund (1275–91) consecrated the cathedral, which was burnt down on the same day, and rebuilt by Isarus, the next bishop (1291–1303). In 1305 it was decided that the city of Stockholm belonged to Uppsala, but Södermalm belonged to Strängnäs.

The poet Thomas Simonsson (1380–1443) was bishop 1429 – 1443. The most famous of the later bishops was Kort Rogge (1479–1501), a doctor of Perugia in northern Italy and a learned humanist. He built the present cathedral choir about 1481, and founded a charterhouse at Svartsjo about 1493 and a hospital for aged and infirm priests at Strängnäs in 1496. In 1495 he had the Breviary of Strengnäs printed at Stockholm in a revised edition.

His successor, Matthias Gregerson Lilje, was the protector of "the Swedish Luther", Olaus Petri (b. at Örebro, 1493), who, having studied as a disciple of Martin Luther and Melancthon at Wittenberg in Saxony (1516–18), returned to Strängnäs in 1519. The bishop made him chancellor of the diocese and master of the cathedral school, and in 1520 he was ordained deacon and became a canon of Strengnäs. There he taught Lutheranism, a form of belief with which Bishop Gregerson was entirely unacquainted. The bishop was beheaded on 8 November 1520 during the massacre at Stockholm.

=== Cathedral and institutions ===
Local religious landmarks include:

- the cathedral of Strängnäs, one of whose numerous chapels now contains a museum of ecclesiastical art
- the bishop's palace, built around 1490 and later repurposed as the cathedral school
- the Church of St. Nicholas in Örebro
- numerous ancient village churches

Three provincial synods were held at Telge in the Diocese of Strängnäs in 1279, 1341 and 1380. The first two issued statutes on matters concerning the discipline of the clergy, while the synod of 1380 threatened with various penalties those who molested the tenants of church lands.

The Södermannalagen, a code of laws published early in the fourteenth century for the people of Södermanland, contains a number of ecclesiastical laws.

Among other institutions, there was in the diocese the chapter of the cathedral, funded about 1288, which counted thirteen members at the end of the fifteenth century, besides which there were a least eighteen chaplains, who served the eighteen altars. The diocese contained in addition Mariefred Charterhouse (1491–1526), and Örebro Priory, founded by the Carmelites in 1418.

== Lutheran Reformation ==
King Christian II of Sweden gave the bishopric to Jens Andersen Beldenak, Bishop of Odense, who however returned to Denmark in April 1521. During the vacancy the diocese was governed by Laurentius Andreae who had become archdeacon of Strängnäs in 1520. He greatly favoured Olaus Petri, and as chancellor of king Gustavus Vasa (1523) he promoted the interests of Protestantism.

The last Catholic bishop of Strängnäs, if he can be called so, was Magnus Sommar (1528–36), dean of Strängnäs in 1518, nominated bishop by Gustavus Vasa in 1522, and consecrated without papal confirmation by Petrus Magni, bishop of Västerås, 6 January 1528. Messenius states that the bishops elect signed a document in which they promised to go to Rome to seek papal confirmation, and thus persuaded Petrus Magni to proceed to the consecration. Magnus Sommar was very submissive towards the king, but his concessions did not save him. He was deposed and imprisoned, and released in order that he might retire to the monastery of Krokek.

== See also ==
- List of bishops of Strängnäs

== Sources and external links ==
- Official website
