= Galten (basin) =

- Location within Södermanland
- Location: Södermanland County, Västmanland County
- Coordinates: 59°27′N 16°10′E
- Type: Fjard
- Part of: Mälaren
- Primary inflows: Arbogaån, Kolbäcksån, Hedströmmen, Köpingsån
- Primary outflows: Blacken
- Catchment area: 12,209 km^{2} (4,714 sq mi) (Note: This includes the catchment area of lake Hjälmaren, whose main discharge is through Eskilstunaån but also drains to Galten through Hjälmare kanal and Arbogaån.)
- Basin countries: Sweden
- Surface area: 54 km^{2} (21 sq mi)

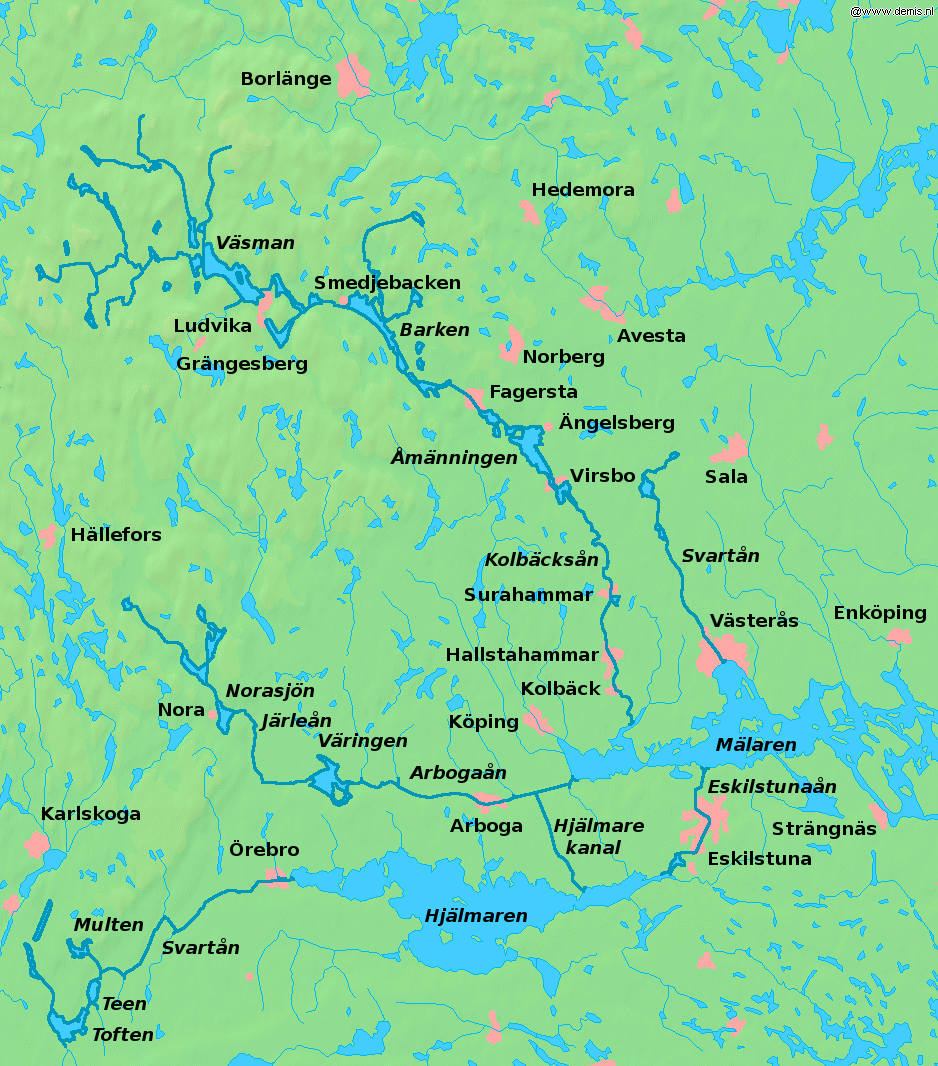
Map of lakes and rivers in south central Sweden, the Bergslagen region

Galten is a fjard of Lake Mälaren, the third-largest lake in Sweden. It is the westernmost part of the lake, and is connected to the fjard of Blacken in the east through the strait of Kvicksund.
