= Rekarne =

Historical name for north-western Södermanland

Coordinates: 59°25′39″N 16°20′28″E

Rekarne (Swedish pronunciation: [ˈrêːkaɳɛ]) is the historical name for the north-western part of the province Södermanland in Sweden. It constitutes the lands on both sides of river Eskilstunaån between Lake Mälaren and Lake Hjälmaren and approximately corresponds to the present day Eskilstuna Municipality.

Historically, Rekarne was from the mid-14th century for administrative purposes divided into:

- West Rekarne hundred
- East Rekarne hundred

and the chartered towns of Torshälla (est. 1317) and Eskilstuna (1659).

Since the large administrative reforms of the mid-20th century, leading to the establishment of Eskilstuna Municipality within its current borders in 1971, the name Rekarne no longer carries any administrative significance, but survives in some local place names, the name of the local Sparbanken Rekarne bank and the Rekarnegymnasiet upper secondary school. The railway station Rekarne in Tumbo only exists as a siding today.

Some localities in the area, like Husby-Rekarne, carry the Rekarne name to distinguish them from other similarly named localities in Sweden. The locality named Rekarne next to the Rekarne railway station was redefined under the name Tumbo by Statistics Sweden in 1990.
