= Torshälla Church =

Coordinates: 59°25′19.13″N 16°28′6.02″E

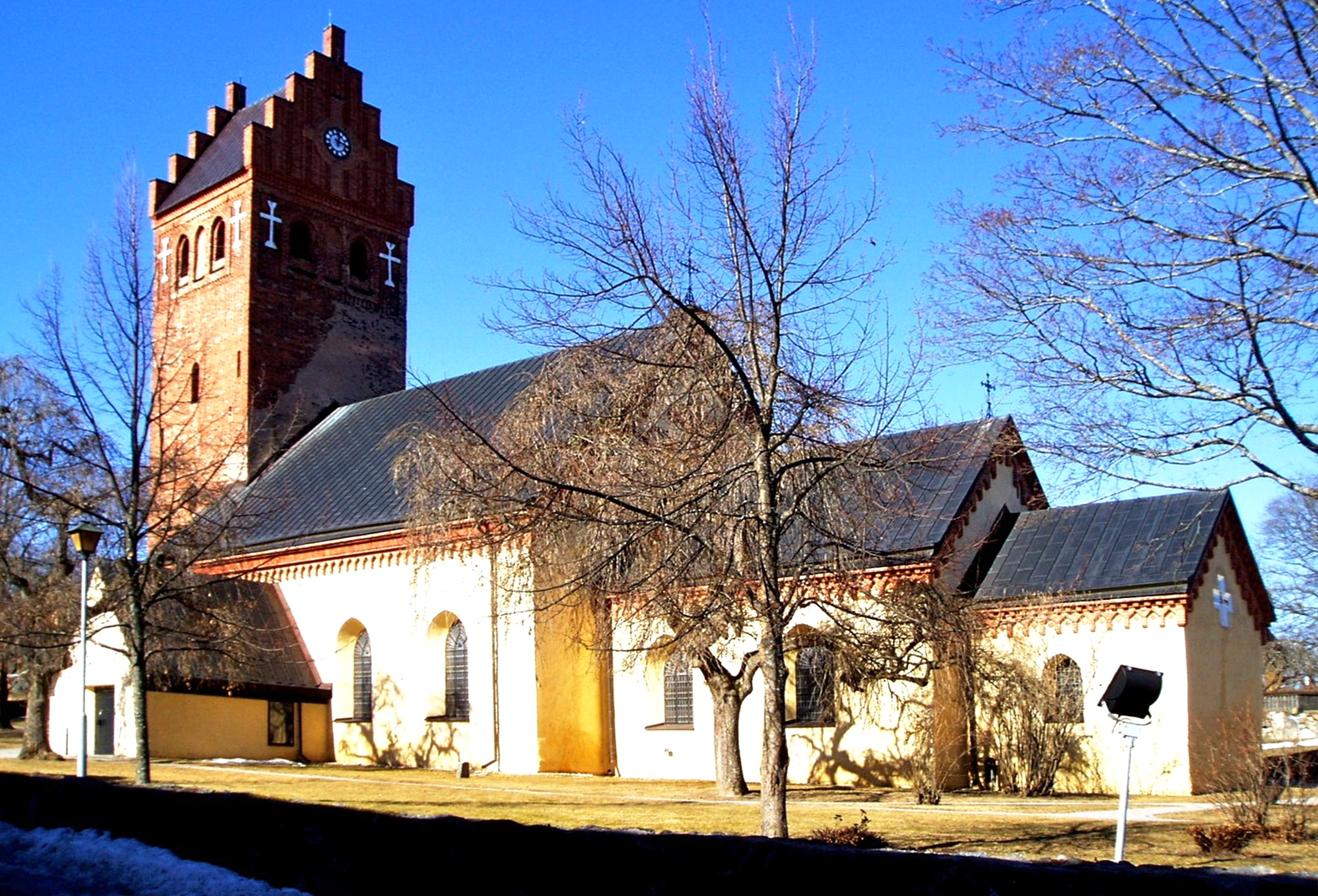
- Torshälla Church in March 2011
- Torshälla Church
- Location: Torshälla
- Country: Sweden
- Denomination: Church of Sweden

History
- Consecrated: 12th century

Administration
- Diocese: Strängnäs
- Parish: Torshälla

Torshälla Church is a medieval church building in Torshälla, Sweden, in the Church of Sweden Diocese of Strängnäs. It serves as the Lutheran town parish church of Torshälla parish and is located at the Rådhustorget market square.

The present church building was originally erected in Romanesque style during the 12th century at the old heathen sacrificial place of Torsharg. Torshälla was granted city rights in 1317, making the old church insufficient for the growing population of the town. A new nave was added to the west, transforming the old nave into a choir.

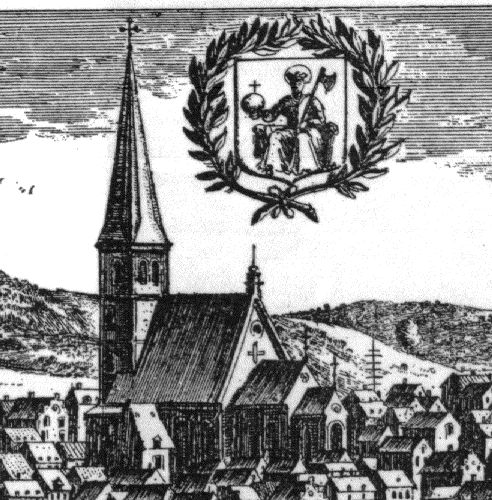
Torshälla Church in a 17th-century engraving by Erik Dahlberg, with the original spire. (Buildings not to scale.)

During the 15th century, the church tower, church porch and vaulted ceiling were added. The tower spire was rebuilt in 1614 to reach a height of 92 meters (302 ft.), making Torshälla Church a landmark used for navigation on nearby Lake Mälaren and one of Sweden's tallest buildings at the time. After the tower spire and the roof were destroyed in 1873, in a fire caused by a lightning strike, they were replaced with the present, lower brick gabled roof.

Wooden sculptures depicting St. Bridget of Sweden, St. Catherine of Vadstena, Saint Gertrude and Saint George are displayed in the church. The preserved 15th century ceiling paintings are attributed to the master painter Albertus Pictor and include the oldest known depiction of eyeglasses in Sweden, showing Abraham as a reading man wearing glasses.

Along the south wall a burial vault was built during the 17th century for the family of the early industrialist and founder of Eskilstuna's iron-working industry Reinhold Rademacher (1609-1668). Notable burials in the graveyard include industrialist and founder of Nyby bruk Adolf Zethelius (1781–1864).

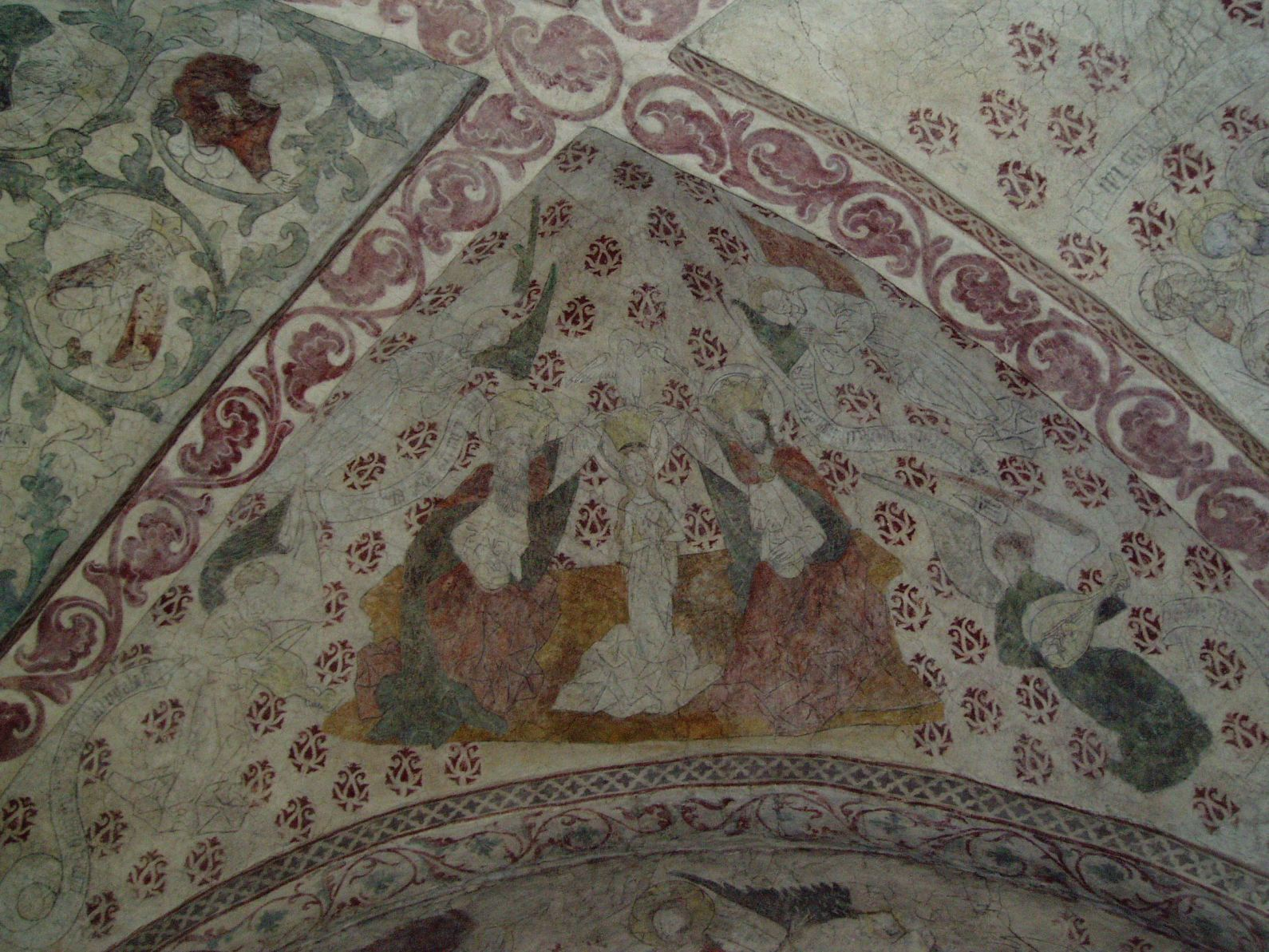
Painted ceiling detail

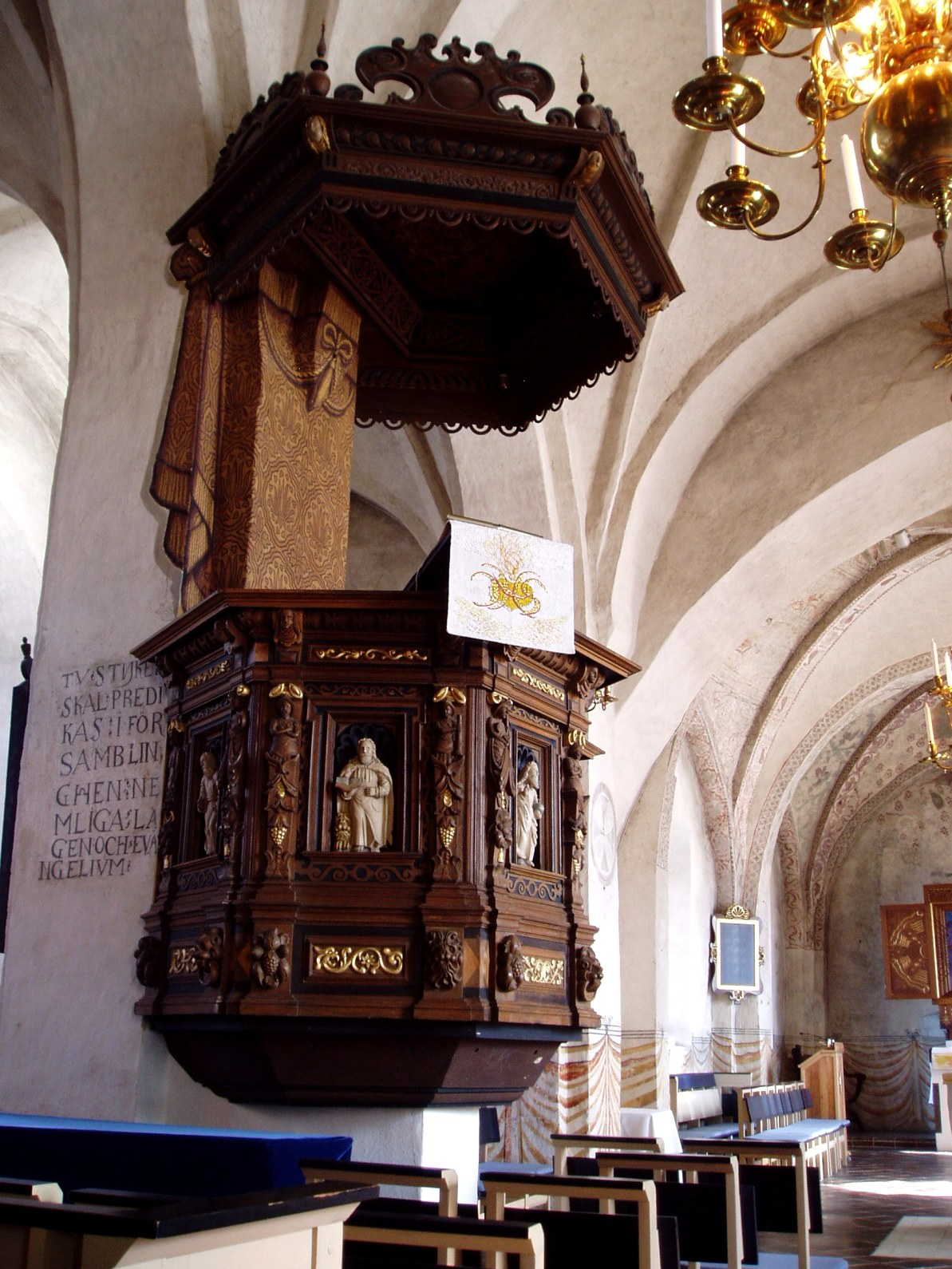
Pulpit

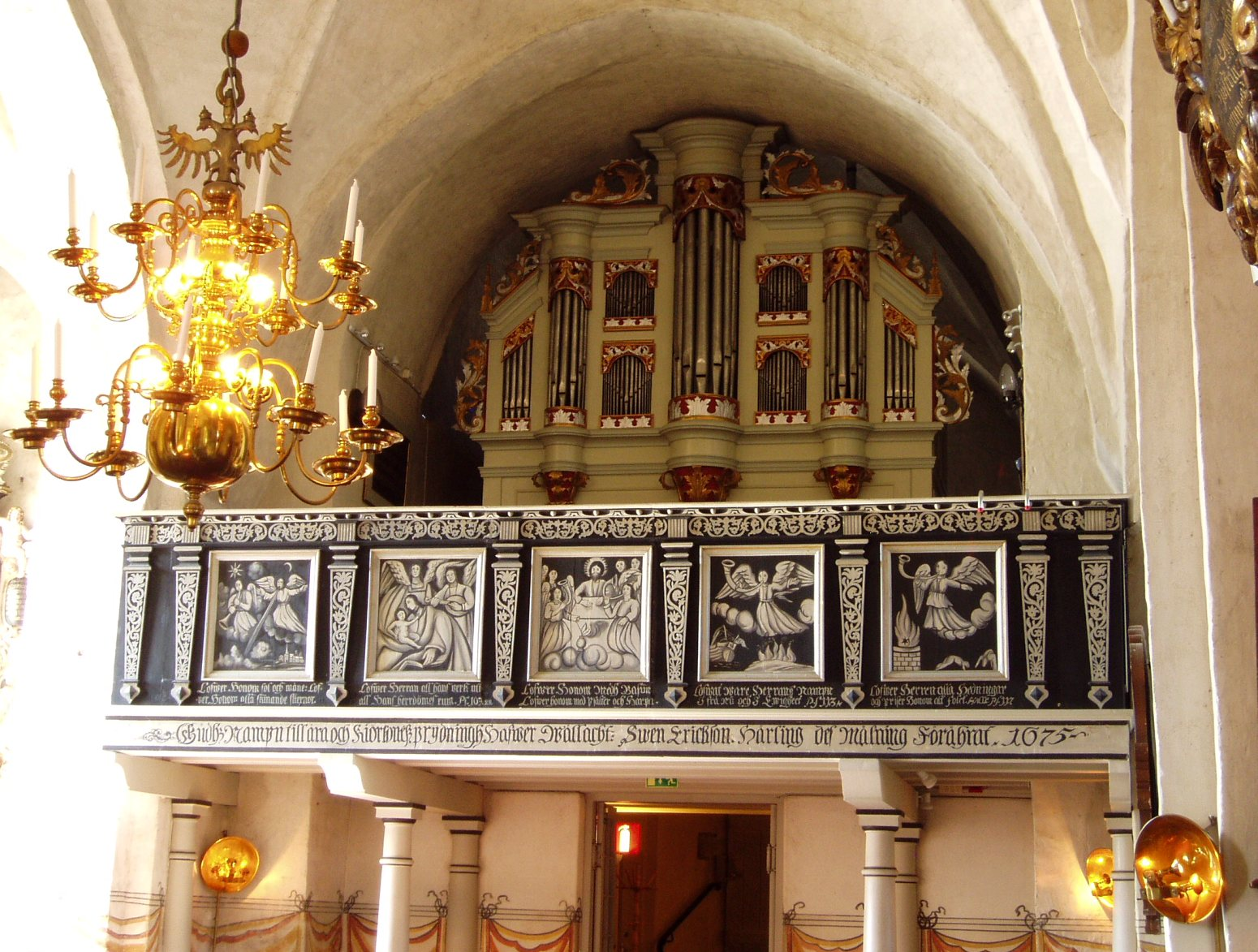
Organ
