= Köping River =

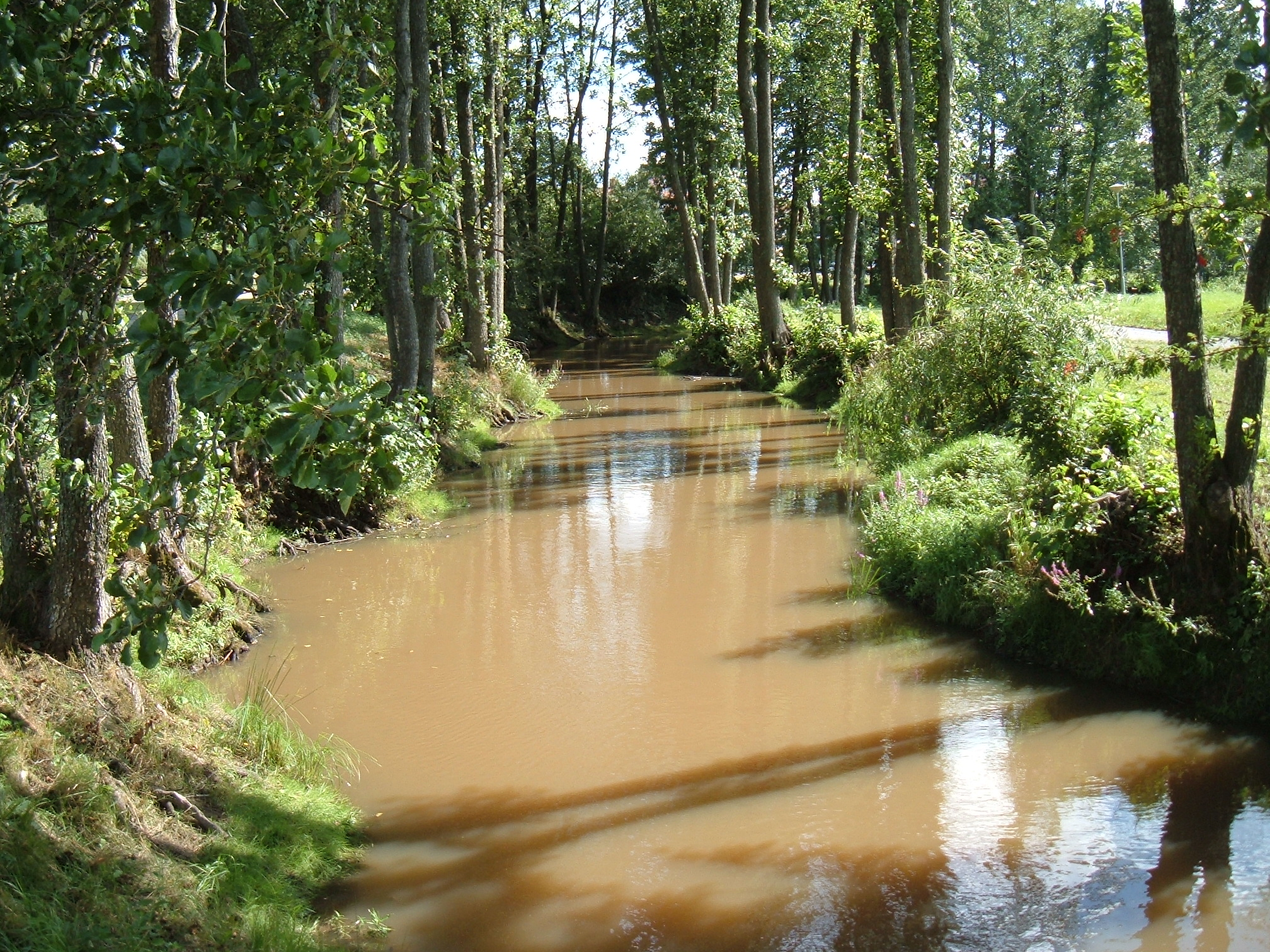
- Köping River in Köping.
- Native name: Köpingsån (Swedish)

Location
- Country: Sweden
- County: Västmanland
- City: Köping

Physical characteristics
- Mouth: Galten in Mälaren
  - coordinates: 59°28′50″N 16°04′10″E
- Length: 38 km (24 mi)
- Basin size: 287 km^{2} (111 sq mi)

Köping River (Swedish: Köpingsån) is a river in Sweden.
