= Outokumpu =

Finnish group of companies

Outokumpu Oyj

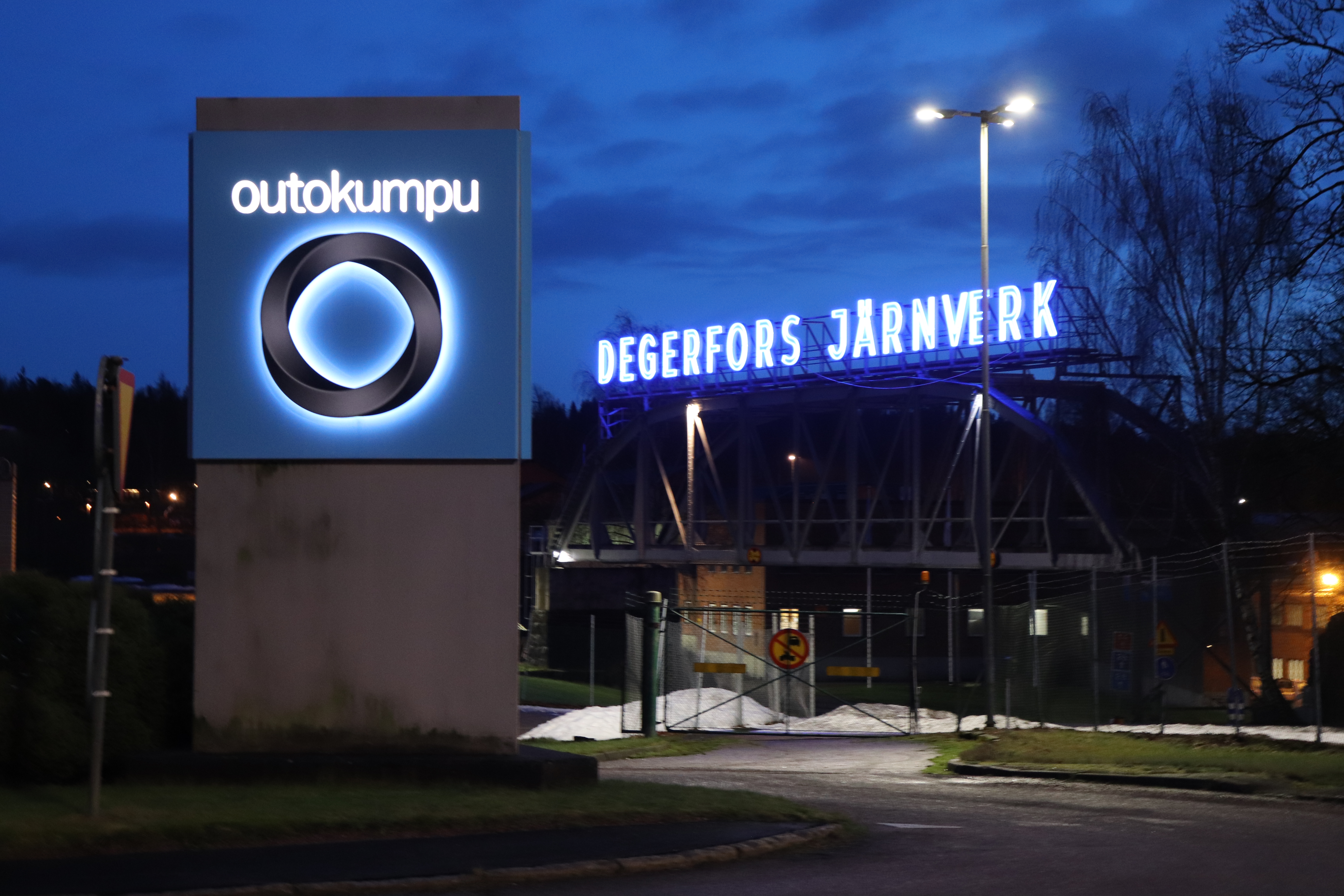
- Type: Public company
- Traded as: Nasdaq Helsinki: OUT1V
- Industry: Stainless steel
- Founded: 1914
- Headquarters: Helsinki, Finland
- Key people: Kari Jordan (chairman), Kati ter Horst (President and CEO)
- Products: Stainless steel
- Revenue: ▲€7.7 billion (2021)
- Operating income: ▲€705 million (2021)
- Net income: ▲€553 million (2021)
- Number of employees: ▼9,395 (2021)
- Website: www.outokumpu.com

Outokumpu Oyj is a group of international companies headquartered in Helsinki, Finland, with 10,600 employees in more than 30 countries. Outokumpu is the largest producer of stainless steel in Europe and the second largest producer in the Americas. Outokumpu also has a long history as a mining company, and still mines chromium ore in Keminmaa for use as ferrochrome in stainless steel. The largest shareholder of Outokumpu is the government of Finland, with 26.6% ownership, including the shares controlled by Solidium, The Social Insurance Institution of Finland, Finnish State Pension Fund and Municipality Pension Agency.

== Company history ==
A large deposit of copper ore was discovered in Outokumpu, Northern Karelia in 1908. Outokumpu was established to develop the now-exhausted mine. Outokumpu developed the flash smelting process in the 1940s for smelting copper.

The company participated in a stainless steel cartel from 1986 to 1988, and was caught in 1990, but not fined. Again, the company along with Swedish company Boliden participated in a cartel for copper tubing in the European market from 1988 to 2001. The European Commission fined the company €36.14 million in December 2003 and September 2004 for this second cartel.

The company developed an alloy called nordic gold under the direction of Mariann Sundberg in 1991, commissioned by the Swedish mint. The material has since been used by other mints for coins, notably three denominations of the Euro.

The company merged with Avesta Sheffield in 2001, the latter formed from a 1991 merger of British Steel Stainless and Swedish firm Avesta. This became the third-largest stainless steel producing company in the world at the time. The new company named AvestaPolarit, headquartered in Stockholm, was jointly owned by Outokumpu and the Corus Group of Swedish institutional investors. The company bought the German company, Lurgi Metallurgie in September 2001.

The company bought the shares owned by Corus in 2004, so AvestaPolarit became a wholly owned subsidiary of the Outokumpu Group, delisted from the Helsinki and Stockholm stock exchanges, and only Outokumpu remained, headquartered in Espoo. The company sold its copper branch in 2005 except for the copper tube and brass division, which as of 2011, is a subsidiary of Mitsubishi Materials, known as Luvata International, and the zinc branch merged with the Boliden. Outokumpu sold all of its Boliden shares. Outokumpu Technology was spun off as a separate company in 2006, renamed Outotec in 2007.

The cold rolling mill in Sheffield was closed in March 2008 during a company-wide 10% fixed cost reduction plan. The melt shop in Sheffield continues producing material for long steel products. They exited the copper business in April 2008 by selling the remaining copper tube and brass division to Cupori Group Oy.

On 31 January 2012, Outokumpu announced it would buy Inoxum, the stainless steel division of German ThyssenKrupp, for 2.7 billion euros. At the time, Finnish state capital controlled 40% of Outokumpu.

In November 2012, the European Commission found this acquisition would have created an EU market dominance for cold-rolled stainless steel flat products with Outokumpu market share above 50%. The EC cleared the merger on the condition that the Italian Inoxum subsidiary Acciai Speciali Terni (AST) was excluded from the deal, and OTK acquired Inoxum in December 2012. Through Inoxum, Outokumpu acquired stainless steel mills in China, Mexico, Bochum, Germany, Werdohl, Germany, and in Calvert, Alabama, USA.

On 30 November 2013, Outokumpu announced it would sell AST, certain service centers and the VDM Metals business to Thyssen Krupp, and in turn, ThyssenKrupp would sell its 29.9% shares in Outokumpu, and sever all other "relevant links" between the two companies. At the same time, on 30 November 2013, Thyssen Krupp announced the same: that it would reacquire AST and other so-called 'remedy assets' as well as VDM (high-performance alloys) from Outokumpu, that it would sell its 29.9% shares in Outokumpu, and sever all other "relevant links" between the two companies.

In February 2014, the EC cleared the AST and VDM acquisition by ThyssenKrupp.

In July 2014, Outokumpu agreed to settle with Boliden and engineering group IMI, who had sued Outokumpu in 2012 to cover Boliden's losses from the lawsuit over price-fixing of copper tubing.

In October 2015, Outokumpu announced the divestment of 55% shares in its Shanghai-based joint venture between Outokumpu (60%) and Baosteel (40%), Shanghai Krupp Stainless (SKS), to Chinese real-estate investment fund Lujiazui International Trust Co. Ltd. In a second step, Outokumpu divested the remaining 5% of its holdings in February 2016 to the same investor. In total Outokumpu recorded a non-recurring capital gain of EUR 389 million (net of taxes and debt repayment) for the sale of the entire 60% share in SKS. At the same time, the Board of Directors of SKS decided to stop the operations of SKS and release the workforce.

In March 2017, employing 100 people, the company opened its global service center in Vilnius, Lithuania.

In April 2020, Outokumpu named former Posti CEO Heikki Malinen as the next chief executive of the company.

In July 2024, Outokumpu appointed Kati ter Horst as the next president and chief executive of the company. Kati assumed office in October 2024.

== Production sites ==
=== Finland ===
Outokumpu's largest production facilities are the integrated steel mills of the Tornio Works, in the small Finnish town Tornio on the coast of Gulf of Bothnia. Tornio Works produces hot rolled and cold rolled coils and sheets cut from coil, with an annual output of two million tonnes. The site consists of ferrochrome smelting, two steel-melting shops, a hot rolling mill and two cold rolling mills. The steel works were built in 1975–1976. The first stainless cast was made in May 1976, week 19, thus it has got the heat number 61901.The main marketing area is the EU. Up to 85% of the products are exported all around the world.

Kemi mine in Keminmaa near Tornio provides chromite, the raw material for chrome, needed to make stainless steel. In 2012, the quantity of chromite was estimated to a depth of one kilometer, totalling some 105 million tonnes.

=== Sweden ===
Avesta Sheffield was acquired 2001 and consists of a stainless steel mill with melting shop, hot rolling for heavy plates, hot rolling for 2000 mm width coils by Steckel mill and cold rolling mills. Avesta developed special stainless steel grades, high-alloy austenitic and duplex grades, optimized for good formability, weldability and high corrosion resistance. Avesta has a long history in steelmaking, as does Sheffield in the UK where stainless steel was invented.

Thin Strip Nyby (see also Nyby bruk) produces cold rolled stainless steel, concentrating on special grades, part of the Special Coil business line. Nyby Ironworks in Torshälla was founded in 1829 by Adolf Zethelius, but ironworking on the site is first documented in the 15th century when the Bishop of nearby Strängnäs founded hammer forges by the waterfall near Nyby.

The Degerfors Long Products steelworks was owned in 2021 by the Outokumpu conglomerate.

=== United Kingdom ===
After the Avesta Sheffield acquisition, Outokumpu owned the Sheffield facility in the UK includes a melt shop, continuous casting, a bar finishing facility and rod mill which are part of Outokumpu's Long Products business, also a stocking, processing and distribution center. Production includes stainless steel in coil, plate, sheet, coiled rod, bar and rebar forms; semi-finished products including slab, bloom, billet and ingot are also manufactured.

Outokumpu's UK acquisitions derived from the works created in 1950 as a joint venture between Firth Vickers (see Firth and Vickers) and Samuel Fox and Company for cold rolling stainless steel, established at Shepcote Lane, Sheffield, originally manufactured under the Staybrite brand. In 1967 the industry was nationalized into the British Steel Corporation. Outokumpu's original three sites in the UK were in Sheffield, Stocksbridge, and Blackburn.

In 2005 the cold rolling and finishing units, Coil Products Sheffield on Shepcote Lane were closed, with the loss of over 600 jobs. Production ceased in the first half of 2006. The company continued the melting shop, special strip cold rolling and finishing, bar rolling, and UK distribution. At the end of March 2008 the Stocksbridge site production ceased after 80 years, with work transferring to its Meadowhall site.

In 2023, Outokumpu divested its Long Products business, including the melting, rod and bar operations in Sheffield, UK, to Marcegaglia. Outokumpu retains service center and sales company in Sheffield.

=== Germany ===
As of 2018 there are production sites in Krefeld, Dillenburg and Dahlerbrück.

The Krefeld mill with 100 years of experience in stainless steel production, closed its melt shop in December 2012 and re-focused on cold rolling and R&D. The nearby Benrath cold rolling mill in Düsseldorf was relocated and joined with Krefeld operations, to make a range of grades, dimensions and surface finishes. The Dahlerbrück cold rolling mill is located in Sauerland producing precision strip and looks back on a 300-year tradition of iron and steelmaking. The cold rolling mill in Dillenburg specializes on surface finishes for example in architecture, building and construction. The Bochum melt shop was closed in 2014.

=== U.S. and Mexico ===
Outokumpu has a melt shop and cold-rolling mill in Calvert, Alabama (purchased from ThyssenKrupp) and a cold rolling mill in San Luis Potosí (Mexico) which manufactures coil, strip, sheet, circles and plate.

== Organization ==
The company is led by a board of directors and a leadership team.

As of June 2022, the members of the Outokumpu Leadership Team held the following positions:

- President and chief executive officer, Heikki Malinen, b. 1962, Finnish citizen
- Chief Financial Officer, Pia Aaltonen-Forsell, b. 1974, Finnish citizen
- Chief Human Resources Officer, Johann Steiner, b. 1966, German citizen
- President – business line, Advanced Materials, Thomas Anstots, b. 1962, German citizen
- Chief Technology Officer, Stefan Erdmann, b. 1972, German citizen
- President – business area Ferrochrome, Martti Sassi, b. 1964, Finnish citizen
- President – business line, Stainless Europe, Niklas Wass, b. 1977, Swedish citizen
- President – business area Americas, Tamara Weinert, b. 1965, German citizen
