= Hedströmmen =

Location
- Country: Sweden
- County: Dalarna, Västmanland, Örebro
- Municipalities: Smedjebacken, Lindesberg, Skinnskatteberg, Köping

Physical characteristics
- Source
  - location: Dalarna County
- Mouth: Mälaren
  - location: Köping Municipality, Västmanland County
  - coordinates: 59°28′11″N 16°03′57″E
- Length: 128 km (80 mi)
- Basin size: 1,060 km^{2} (410 sq mi)
- Discharge
  - average: 10 m^{3}/s (350 cu ft/s)
  - maximum: 90 m^{3}/s (3,200 cu ft/s)

Hedströmmen is a river located in Bergslagen in Sweden.
