= Arboga River =

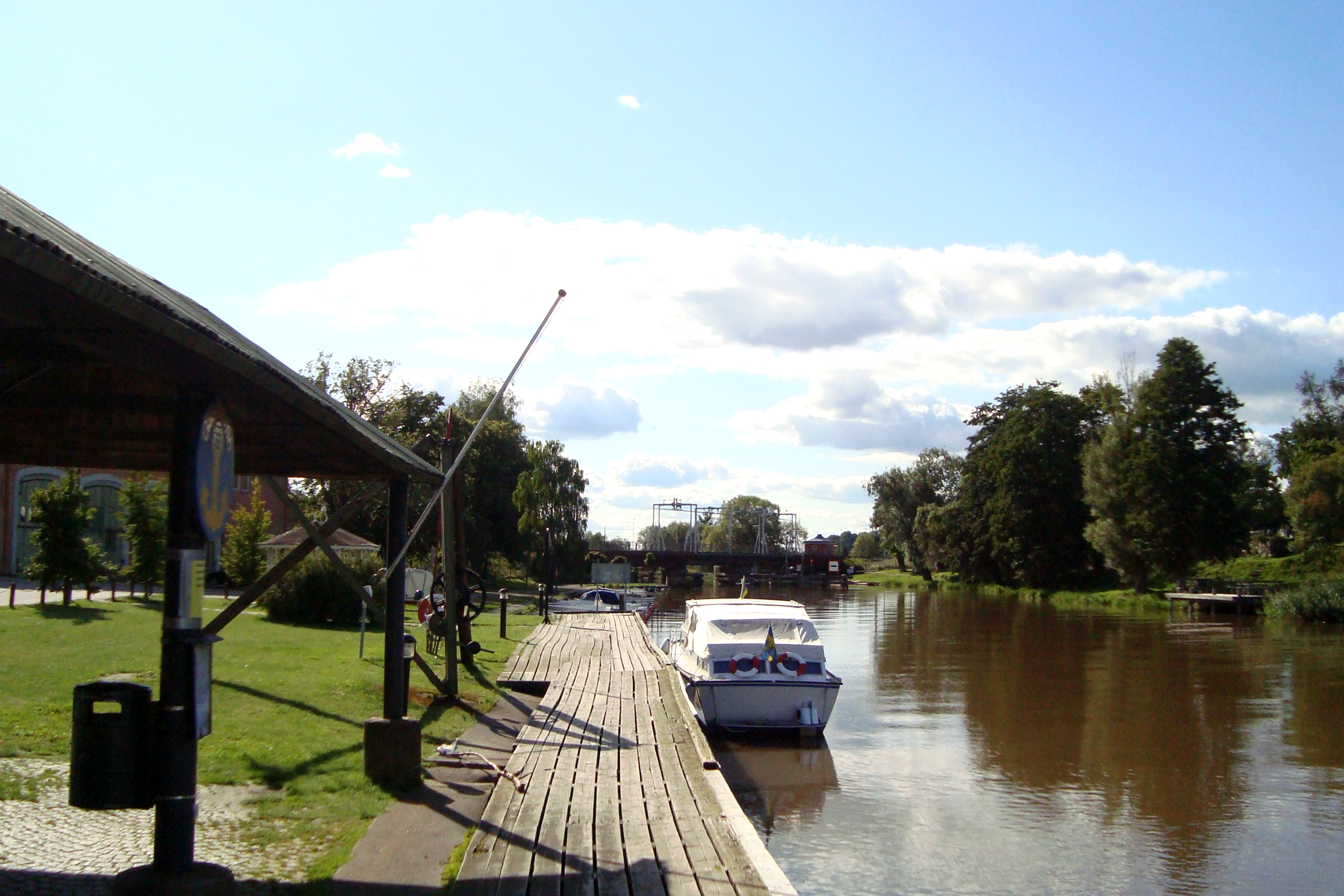
- The harbour of Kungsör, Arboga River

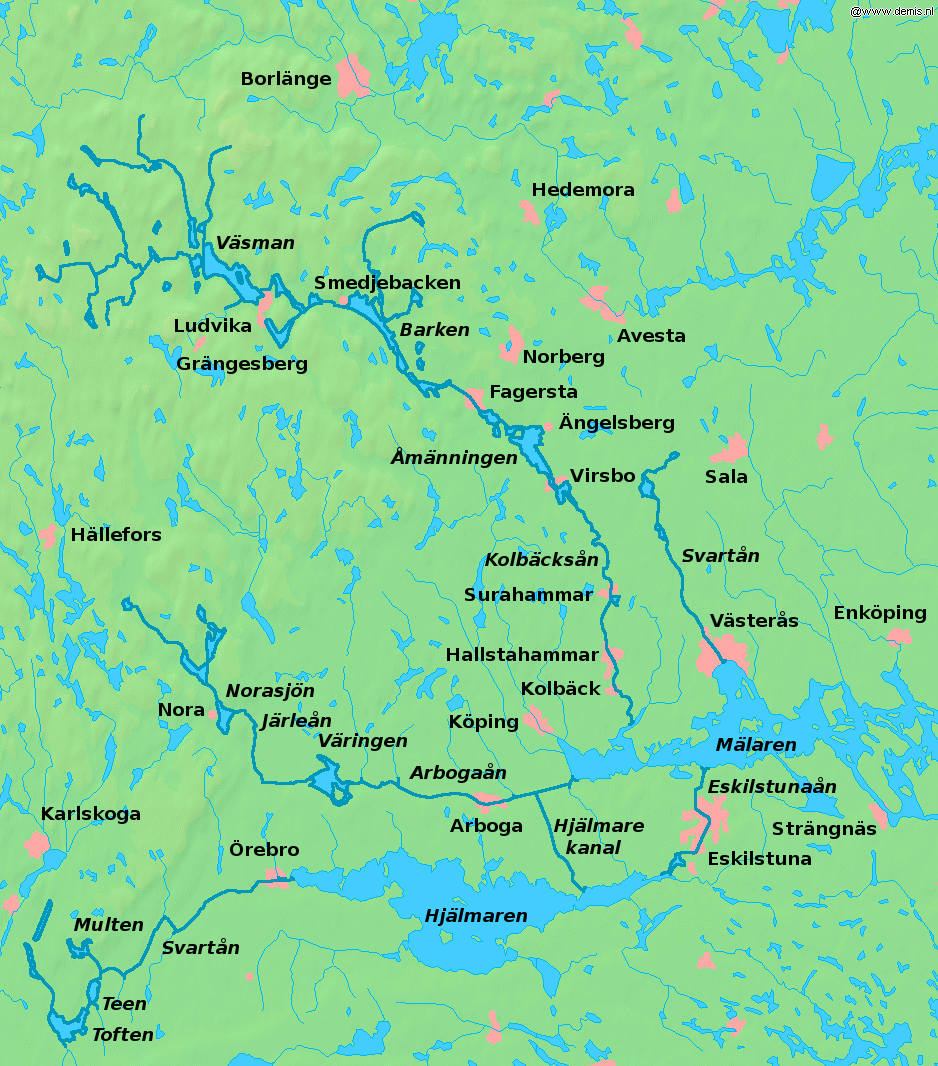
- Native name: Arbogaån (Swedish)

Location
- Country: Sweden
- County: Örebro, Västmanland

Physical characteristics
- Source: Väringen
  - coordinates: 59°25′30″N 15°26′05″E
  - elevation: 32 m (105 ft)
- Mouth: Mälaren
  - location: Kungsör
  - coordinates: 59°25′50″N 16°06′15″E
  - elevation: 0.7 m (2 ft 4 in)
- Length: 145 km (90 mi)
- Basin size: 3,808 km^{2} (1,470 sq mi)
- Discharge
  - average: 38 m^{3}/s (1,300 cu ft/s)

The Arboga River (Swedish: Arbogaån) is a river in Sweden. It flows from the lake Väringen, through Arboga and eventually into the lake Mälaren at Kungsör.
