= Hjälmare kanal =

Canal in Arboga Municipality, Sweden

Coordinates: 59.34439°N 15.96039°E

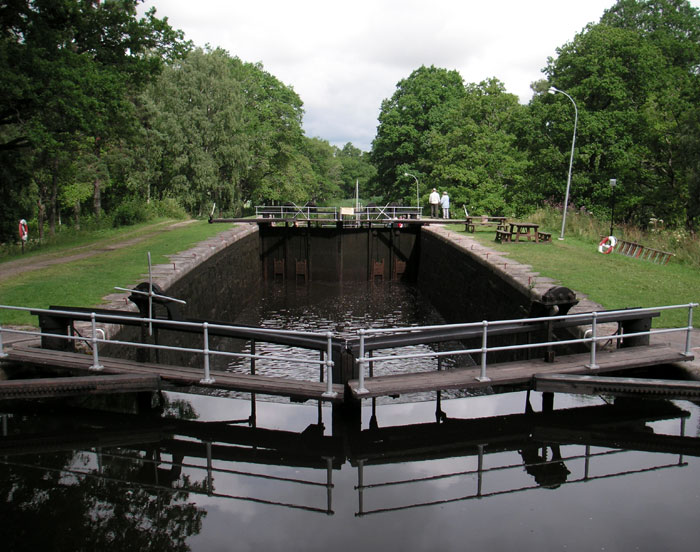
The locks at Hällby. July 2005

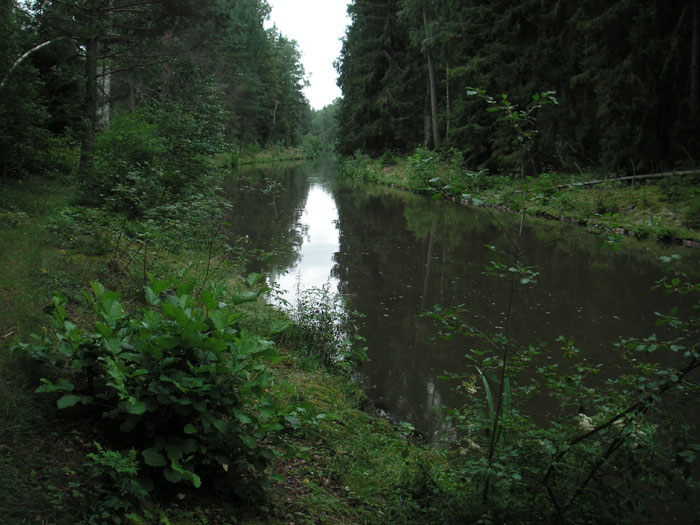
The canal southwards through the forest. July 2005

Hjälmare Canal (Swedish: Hjälmare kanal [ˈjɛ̂lːmarɛ kaˈnɑːl]) is a 13.7 kilometre long canal in Sweden that connects Lake Hjälmaren with Lake Mälaren. It was built in 1639, making it the oldest artificial waterway in the country.

The canal was taken into use in 1639, aimed to transport iron from the Central Swedish Mining District to Stockholm and further abroad. Plans to extend the canal west of Örebro to Lake Vänern and further to Göta älv were never realized (hilly area). Instead Göta Canal, located further south and taken into use in 1832, fulfilled the aimed function of connecting the Baltic with the North Sea.

Traffic on the Hjälmaren Canal was frequently discontinued due to a considerable maintenance need, which is why the canal was relocated in 1830. The relocation led to radically decreased maintenance costs and increased reliability. But the canal's importance diminished in the late 19th century due to competition from rail transport. At the same time Sweden's metallurgic and timber industry came to focus on provinces far further north in Sweden.

Since the reconstruction of 1830, 9 canal locks lower the boats 22 metres down to Lake Mälaren. Boats may not exceed the dimensions 30x7 metres and a maximum draught of 1.9 metres.
