= Kemi mine =

Chromium mine in Finland

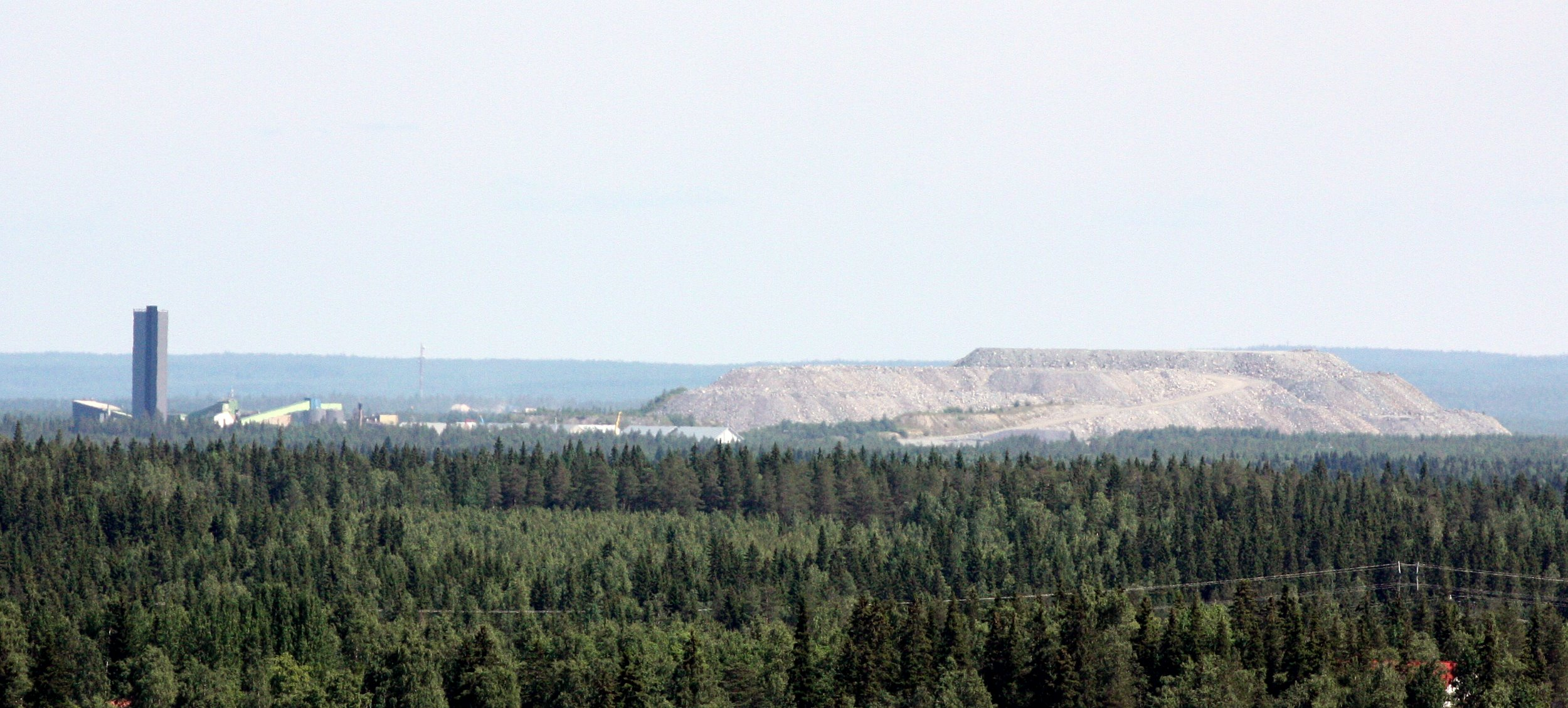

- Location in Finland
- Location: Kemi, Lapland, Finland; 65°47′N 24°43′E
- Products: Chromium
- Company: Outokumpu

The Kemi Mine is owned by Outokumpu Chrome Oy, a subsidiary of Outokumpu Oyj. It is located in Elijärvi, in the municipality of Keminmaa, to the north of Kemi. The Kemi Mine is the largest underground mine in Finland, with an annual production capacity of 2.7 million tonnes of ore. It is also part of the integrated ferrochrome and stainless steel manufacturing chain owned by Outokumpu in the Kemi-Tornio region. The Kemi Mine has approximately 400 employees every day, both employees of Outokumpu and contractors.

The purpose of the Kemi Mine in the long production chain from chromite ore to stainless steel is to produce concentrates from ore as raw material for the manufacture of ferrochrome at the ferrochrome plant located in Tornio. The chrome contained in the ferrochrome generated as a product at the ferrochrome plant – used as an alloying material in the steel manufacturing process – is what makes the steel manufactured at the Tornio steel plant stainless.

Operational safety, cost-effectiveness and eco-friendliness are characteristics of the Kemi Mine. Low accident figures, together with clean and properly organized working environments, both 500 meters underground and on the surface, make an excellent setting for effective production, modern technological applications and the use of advanced working methods. Operations cause only a minor environmental impact because of the insolubility of the oxidic chromite ore, the chemical-free concentration method based on gravity, and the sealed process water circulation covering the entire mine and concentration process.

== History ==
Signs of the existence of a chromite ore body were first discovered by amateur diver Martti Matilainen. Of the samples he sent to the Geological Survey of Finland, one was discovered to be high in chrome content on 30 June 1959. The sample was taken from the current mine area, and the ore deposit was discovered by the next spring. Geologist Aarno Kahma led the exploration. After its baseline study, the Geological Survey of Finland handed over the deposit to Outokumpu Oy, which continued the survey until 1962. At the time, the size of the ore body was estimated to be 30 million tonnes. In autumn 1964, Outokumpu decided to start utilizing the chrome deposit in Kemi and started to build a road from Perta-aapa to Elijärvi in autumn 1965. At the same time, earth-moving work began in the future mine area. The first mine buildings were completed late in 1966.

The Kemi Mine opened in 1968. Initially, it operated as an open-pit mine. In the same year, the Tornio ferrochrome plant also started operating, with the first liquid metal pouring from the ferrochrome furnace (VKU1) taking place in August.

The excavation and construction of the underground mine started in 1999. Open-pit mining ended at the Kemi Mine in December 2005 with the final open-pit blasting.

From 2017 to 2023, Outokumpu invested 280 million euro into deepening the underground mine from 500 meters to 1,000 meters.

== Ore body ==
The Kemi Mine is the only chromium mine in the European Union. Currently, the mine extracts 2.4 million tonnes of chrome ore per year. The verified size of the ore body is approximately 50 million tonnes. In addition, the volume of mineral reserves is approximately 98 million tonnes, having been evaluated to a depth of one kilometre. The deposit, with an average thickness of 40 meters, is nearly vertical and approximately one kilometer in length. The depth of the ore deposit remains unclear. The ore contains 26% chromium oxide with a chrome to iron ratio of 1.6. According to the survey report by the Geological Survey of Finland, the chrome ore deposit extends to a depth of two to three kilometres, possible even to four kilometres. Previously, it was estimated that the ore and mineral reserves in Kemi would be sufficient for 70–80 years, but on the basis of more recent information, it is possible that there will be extractable ore for hundreds of years, even after the planned doubling of production.

In terms of excavated volume, the mine, which opened in 1968, is among the largest in Finland, with an annual excavated volume of 2.4 million tonnes of ore. By the end of 2005, a total of 31.4 million tonnes of chromite ore had been extracted from various open-pit mines. Opened in 2003, the underground mine had produced 10.6 million tonnes of chromite ore by the end of 2013.

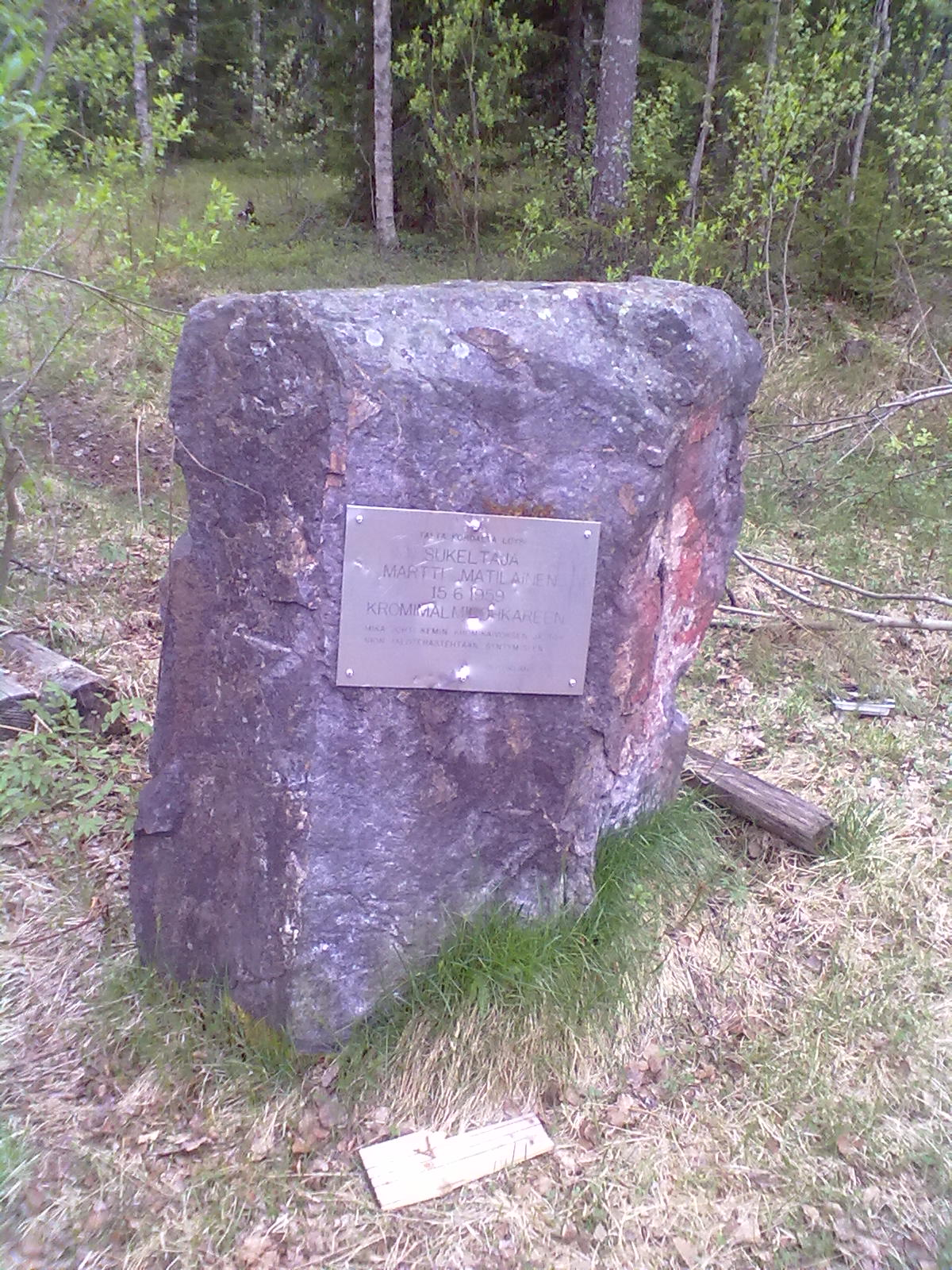
A memorystone was erected in the exact location where the first sample of chromite ore was found on 15 June 1959. The Mine was open six years later. Text in English: "From this location found diver Martti Matilainen 15 June 1959 a chromite malm stone, that lead to opening of Kemi Mine and Tornio Steel factory."

== Ore production ==
Chromite ore was extracted from open-pit mines reaching depths of approximately 200 meters until 2005. In 2003, underground mining began.

The underground mine is accessible either via an incline ramp or a mine shaft. Ore extraction started at level 500, from which the process proceeds upwards towards the bottom of the open-pit. Fully excavated primary stopes are filled with waste rock. From each stope, the ore is carried to an underground crushing station. The crushed ore is transferred via a conveyor belt to crushed ore silos located close to the mine shaft and further to a skip via a measuring pocket. The ore is hoisted through the shaft to an unloading silo located in a 70-meter-tall lifting tower, from where it is forwarded to the concentration process.

Maintenance of the underground movable machinery takes place underground, where the facilities and equipment required for water extraction, ventilation, electrification, communication and other infrastructure are also located.

In addition to the currently active Elijärvi and Viia ore bodies, underground mining is beginning in the Surmaoja ore body alongside the other two ore bodies from level 500 upwards. Because of the mining method used, the ore extraction process in each ore body always proceeds upwards towards the bottom of the open-pit mine, while filling fully extracted areas with waste rock.

== Concentrate production ==
Ore is concentrated at two concentration plants located at the Kemi Mine into lump and fine concentrate. In the first phase, the ore is crushed for further processing. At the lump concentration plant, lump concentrate is separated from the crushed ore using the sink-and-float method. The grain size is 12–100 mm. After grinding, feed material from the fine concentration plant is concentrated into fine concentrate using spiral separators. At the fine concentration plant, the ore is concentrated into fine concentrate using gravitational and highly magnetic concentration methods.

The annual production capacity of lump concentrate is approximately 400,000 tonnes and that of fine concentrate is approximately 850,000 tonnes. The content of chromium oxide in the concentrates is 36% and 45%, respectively. The concentrate is carried to the Tornio ferrochrome plant by road transportation.

The Kemi Mine is accessible by rail from the Oulu–Tornio track via a connection known as the “Elijärvi mine track”: Rail transportation of ore ended on 31 December 2005 when a local road transportation entrepreneur made a better offer for the transportation of ore between the Kemi Mine and the Tornio plant.
