= Torshälla =

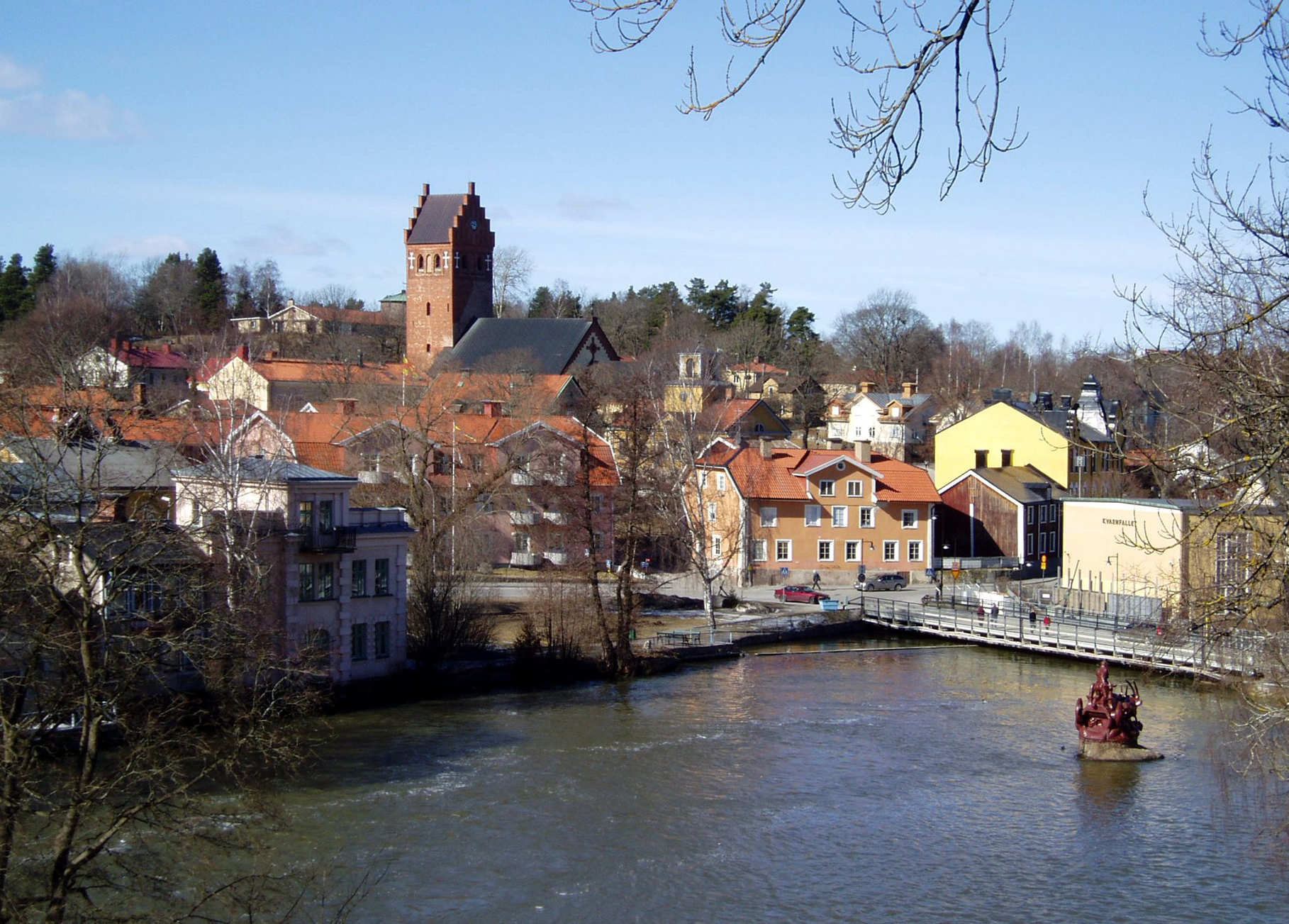

- Coat of arms

- Location within Södermanland Location within Sweden
- Coordinates: 59°25′N 16°28′E
- Country: Sweden
- Province: Södermanland
- County: Södermanland County
- Municipality: Eskilstuna Municipality

Area
  - Total: 5.64 km^{2} (2.18 sq mi)

Population (31 December 2020)
  - Total: 9,444
  - Density: 1,670/km^{2} (4,340/sq mi)
- Time zone: UTC+1 (CET)
  - Summer (DST): UTC+2 (CEST)

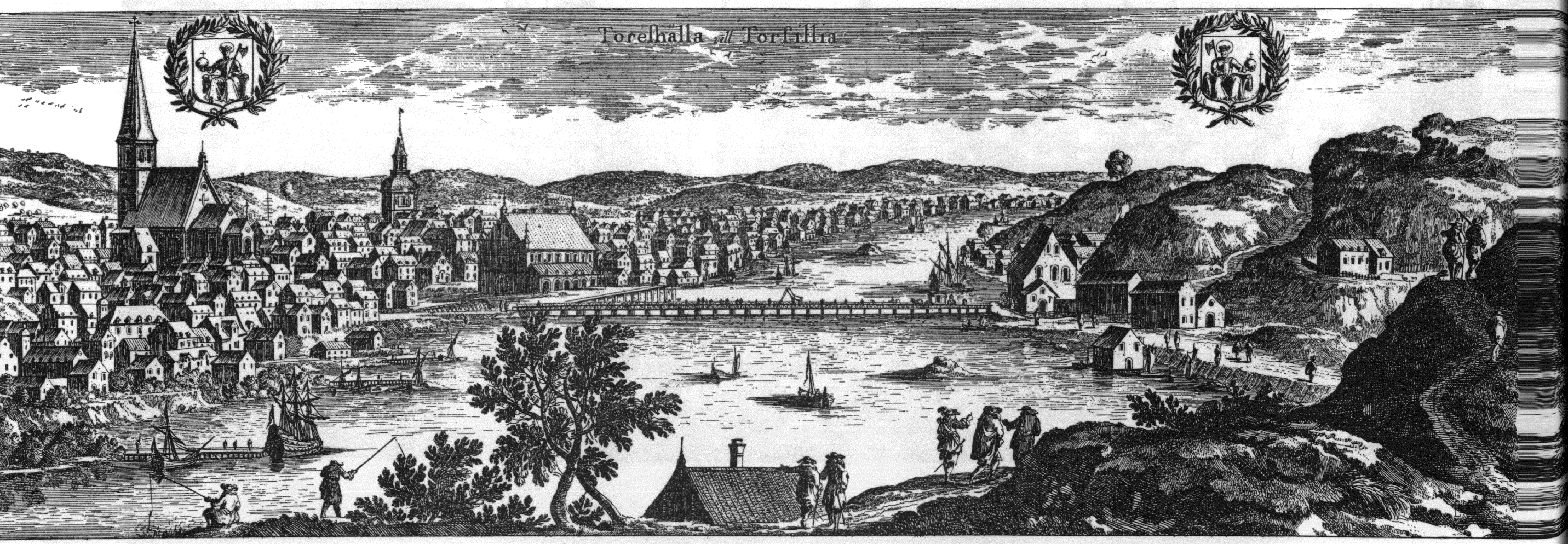
A false scale propaganda engraving of 17th century Torshälla from Erik Dahlberg's Suecia Antiqua et Hodierna

Torshälla (Swedish pronunciation: [ˈtɔ̂ʂːˌhɛlːa]) is a locality situated in Eskilstuna Municipality, Södermanland County, Sweden with 7,612 inhabitants in 2010. It is mainly known for steel manufacturing, centered on the Nyby Bruk steel mill, and also for its historic old town centre.

Because of its historic town status, from 1317 to 1971, Torshälla is customarily referred to as a stad (town or city) even though it does not have a population of 10,000, which is the threshold presently used by Statistics Sweden to classify localities as stads.

Before the local government reform of 1971 Torshälla was an independent municipality. A new proposal to detach Torshälla from Eskilstuna Municipality was turned down in a referendum in 2006.

== History ==
=== Foundation and early history ===
Torshälla is one of the oldest towns in Sweden and received city rights as early as 1317 from King Birger. The oldest part of the town church is from the 12th century; however, the church was likely built on top of, or close to, the site of an earlier Old Norse holy place, where the god Thor was worshipped during the Viking Age.

The name Torshälla stems from Þors harg, which means "place for sacrificing to Thor". The town is located at Eskilstunaån's very first rapids upstream of Lake Mälaren, creating a natural trading and reloading site. Several archeological digs have uncovered remains of two (possibly three) "strong houses", that is, small fortresses or castles, the one on Husberget next to the rapids dating from around 1300 AD. The fortification on Husberget was burned to the ground during the late 14th century.

In 1436, during the aftermath of the Engelbrekt Rebellion, Torshälla was plundered by the forces of Lord High Constable of Sweden (later King) Karl Knutsson Bonde, due to siding with the local nobleman Erik Puke's uprising.

Torshälla was during the Middle Ages the dominant trading town in Rekarne, the northwestern part of Södermanland County, which roughly corresponds to present day Eskilstuna Municipality. After neighbouring Eskilstuna was granted town rights in 1659, Torshälla lost in relative importance due to the rapid growth of industry and trade in Eskilstuna, the building of a canal bypassing the rapids in Torshälla, and the great fire which devastated Torshälla in 1798.

=== Industrial era ===
The development of Torshälla during the 19th and 20th centuries was greatly influenced by the foundation of an ironworks on the lands of Nyby manor house on the western outskirts of Torshälla. The Nyby Bruk ironworks was founded in 1829 by the silversmith and industrialist Adolf Zethelius. The mill village of Nyby Bruk grew up around the ironworks, forming a symbiotic relationship with the neighbouring town.

Several small tool making and mechanical industries were established in Torshälla during the mid- to late 19th century, using the available water power around the river; Johan Termaenius' mechanical works (1846), F O Nyström's tin vessel factory (1854), Ali Andersson's Torshälla saw blade factory (1881) and Holmens' foundry & mechanical works (1888).

In 1895 the Northern Södermanland Railway was connected to Nyby Bruk, bypassing Torshälla town centre. Passenger traffic on the line was discontinued in 1933 after which the tracks were exclusively used for freight to Nyby.

During the years between 1900 and 1940, Torshälla experienced dwindling population numbers with recession hitting the local manufacturing industry hard.

=== 1940 – present day ===
During the decades of economic growth leading up to the 1970s the Nyby Bruk steel mill attracted large numbers of workers from other parts of Sweden and from abroad. A significant part of the immigrant workforce was Finnish, which accounts for the high proportion of Sweden Finnish Torshälla inhabitants today.

As part of the local government reform of 1971 Torshälla became part of neighbouring Eskilstuna Municipality with Eskilstuna as the municipal centre. Due to the close proximity of and loss of business to the larger neighbour Eskilstuna, Torshälla has in recent years gradually acquired the character of a picturesque commuter town, while still retaining a significant stainless steel industry.

In a referendum concurrent with the elections of 2006, the inhabitants of Eskilstuna Municipality turned down a proposed split of the municipality into two parts, which would have made Torshälla an independent municipality. The result was a 67.5% majority for the status quo. However, Torshälla remains an own administrative division within the municipality, with certain local government duties delegated to the town administration.

== Economy ==
The main industry and private employer in Torshälla is Outokumpu, producing cold rolled stainless steel products at Nyby Bruk.

== Sports ==
- Torshälla Nyby Idrottsällskap (TNIS) is the local soccer team, founded on February 12, 1914, when the existing local teams Torshälla Guif, Nyby Bruk IF and IF Östermalms merged and formed Torshälla-Nyby Idrottsällskap; TNIS. Soon thereafter Torshälla AIK choose to join the club and March 7 of that year four cooperating sports clubs became TNIS. Initially the club had Guif's red shirts and black pants. Nowadays the team plays in green / black-striped shirts with white pants and green socks.

== Sights ==
- Bergströmska gården (Bergström House) is a well preserved 18th century merchant loghouse which houses the local history museum. The surrounding blocks form the oldest surviving parts of the historic small town.
- Ebelingmuseet (Ebeling Museum) is an art museum with a permanent collection of the works of Swedish-American artist and sculptor Allan Ebeling. Many of his works are exhibited in prominent public places in Torshälla, including Tors bockar in Torshällaån and Vattenbärerskan in Östra Torget.
- The 19th century mill village of Nyby bruk with Nyby Manor House and workers' houses.
- Torshälla Church has a well preserved 15th century painted ceiling made by the painter Albertus Pictor, featuring the earliest known depiction of eyeglasses in Sweden.
- Torshälla Town Hall at Rådhustorget, built in 1833. The tower clock was originally made for Strängnäs Cathedral and dates from the 16th century.
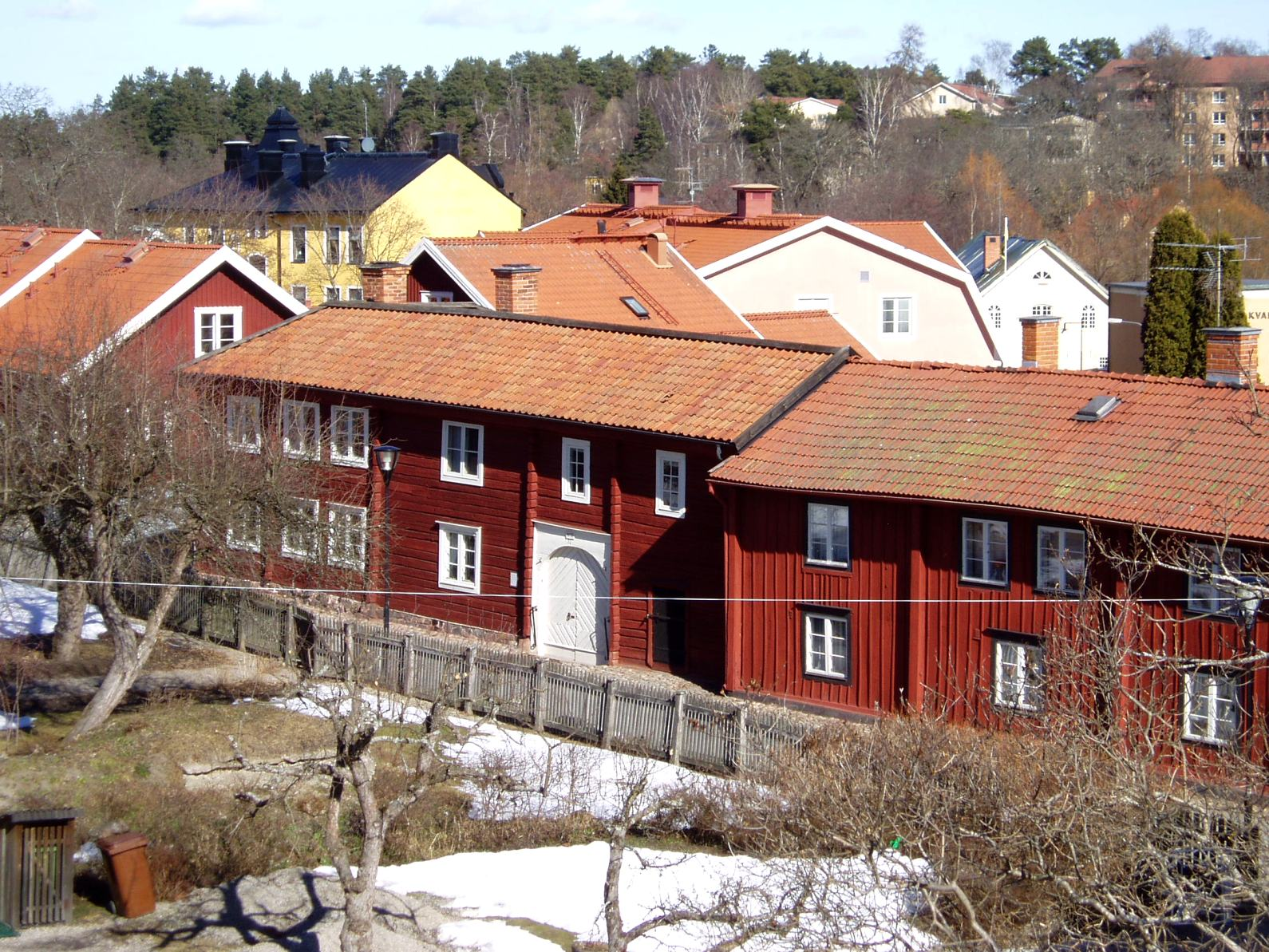
Bergströmska gården (Bergström House)

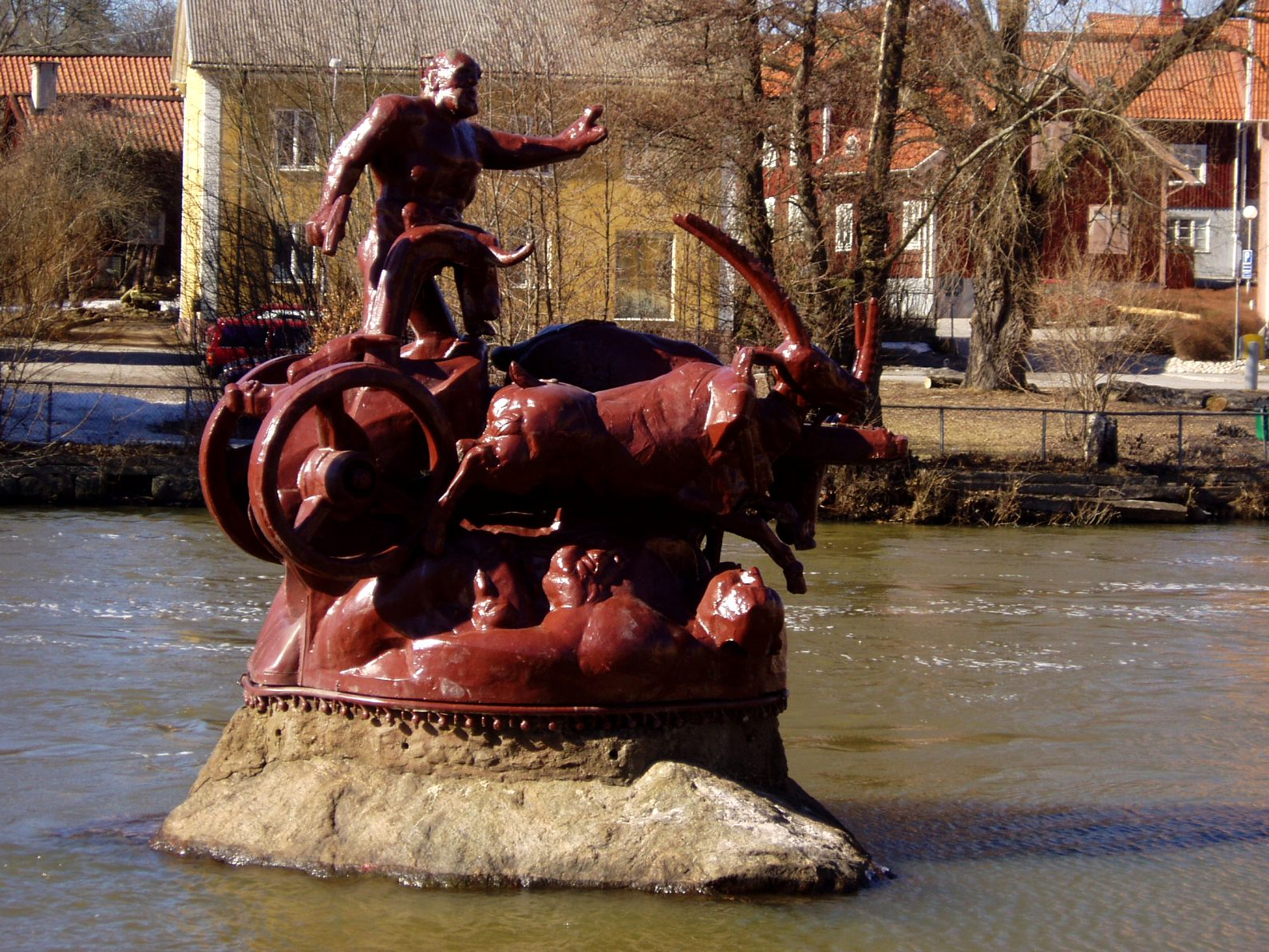
Tors bockar (Thor's Bucks) by Allan Ebeling

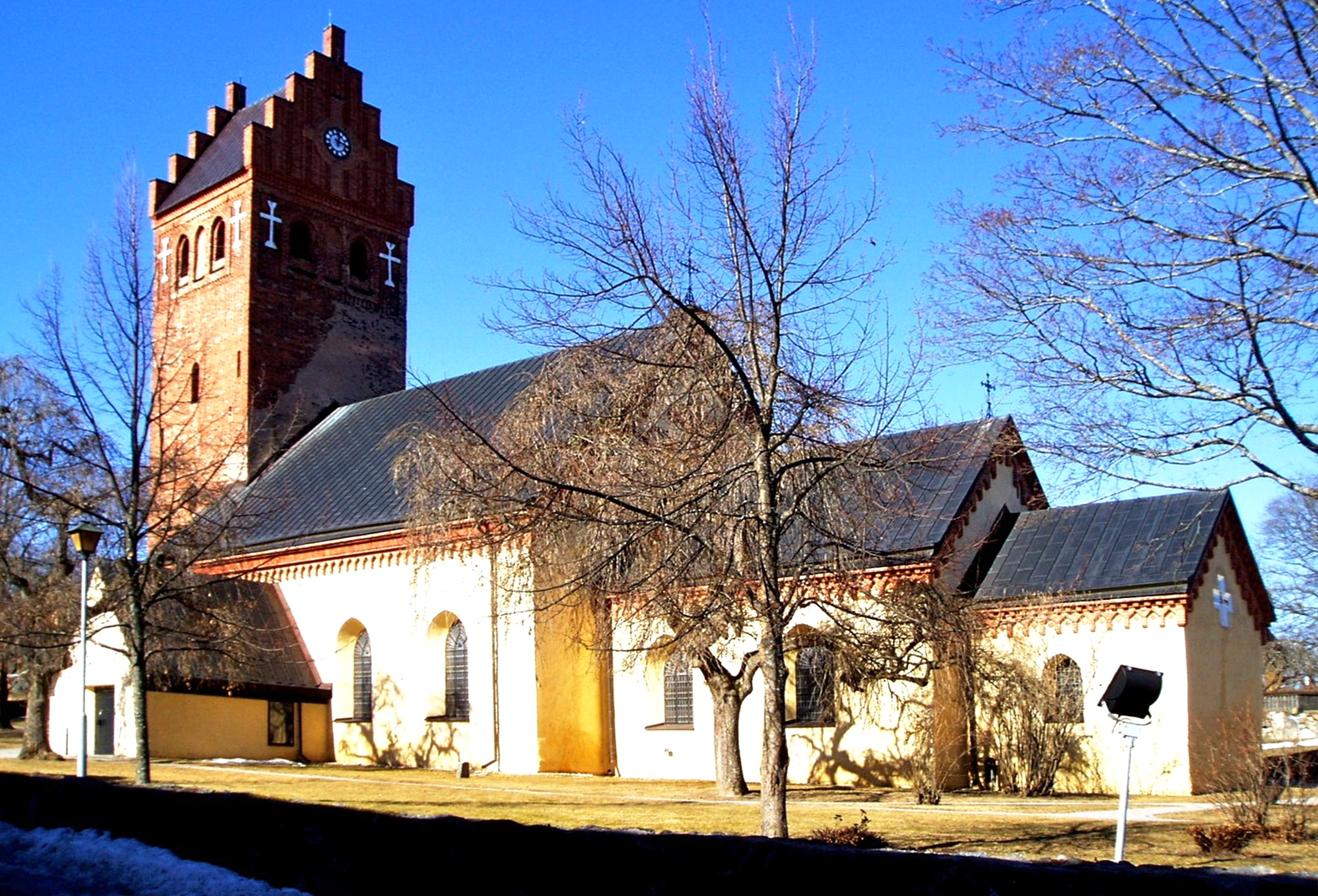
Torshälla Church

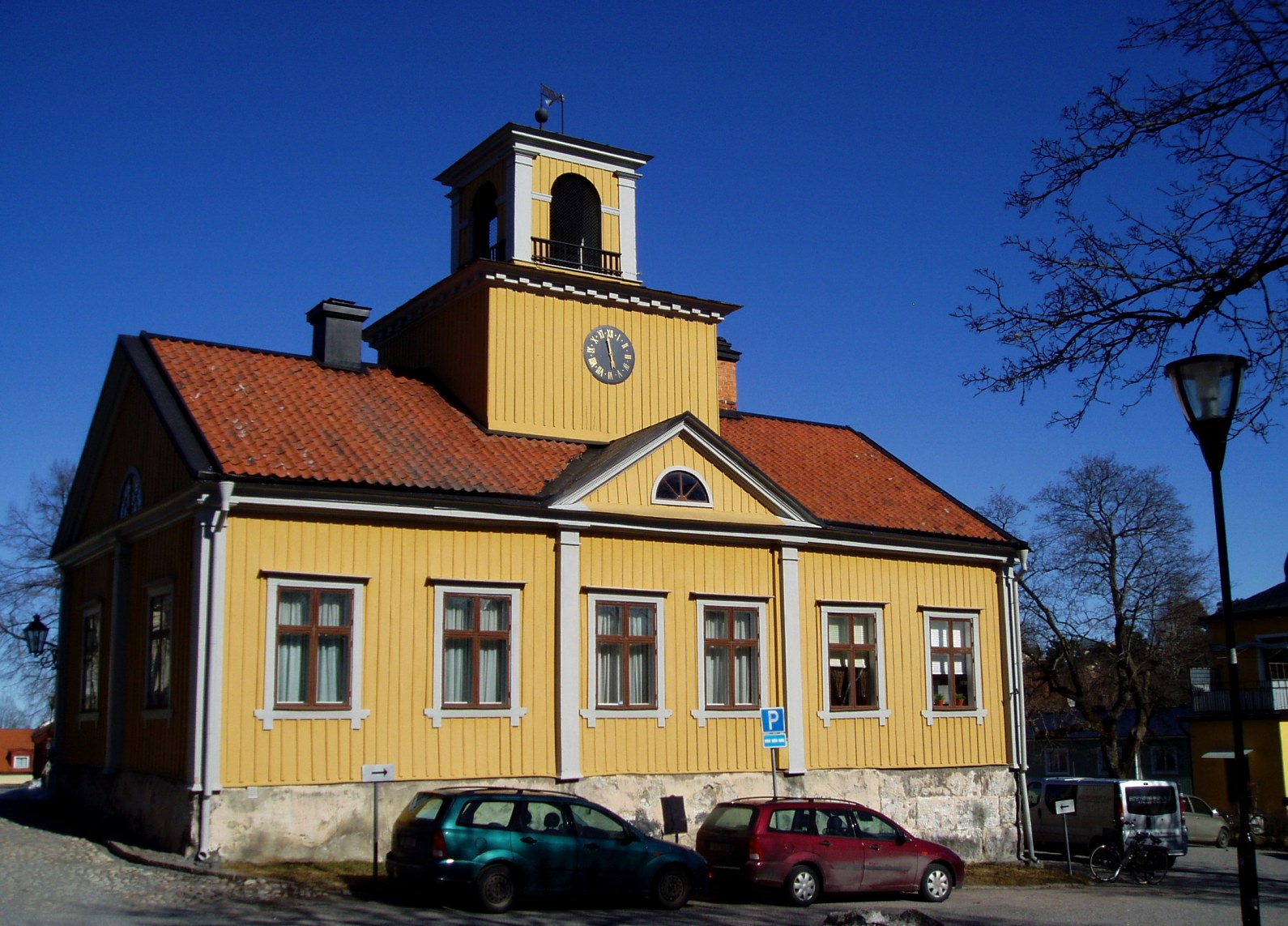
Torshälla Town Hall

== Transport ==
Torshälla is situated 4 mi (7 km) north of the municipal seat in Eskilstuna. European route E20 passes south of Torshälla, and the distance by E20 to Stockholm is 71 mi (114 km). Swedish national road 56 passes west of Torshälla, providing road connections to northern and southern Sweden.

The old Northern Södermanland Railway connection to the present day main line of Svealandsbanan has since the 1930s only been used for goods traffic. The closest train station is in Eskilstuna, and there are frequent city bus connections to Eskilstuna available.

Torshälla boat harbour is reachable by boat from Lake Mälaren through the river Torshällaån and is mostly used by leisure boats and tourist boats. The Eskilstunaån river, upstream of the now-defunct locks in Torshälla Canal, is only partially navigable, due to the very low clearance under the several fixed bridges which have been built over the river since the 1960s.

== Notable residents ==
Notable present and former residents of Torshälla include:

- Kjell Bergqvist, actor
- Allan Ebeling (1897–1975), artist and sculptor
- Ulf Kristersson, liberal-conservative politician, Moderate Party leader and prime minister of Sweden
- Anni-Frid Lyngstad, singer in ABBA
- Markus Mustonen, member of Swedish rock band Kent
- Anna Nordqvist, professional golfer playing for Torshälla GK
- Raimo Raag, Estonian linguist and cultural historian
- Yvonne Ryding, Miss Universe pageant winner
- Sami Sirviö, member of Swedish rock band Kent
- Walter Thür, organ builder
