= Nyby bruk =

Coordinates: 59°25′26″N 16°27′33″E

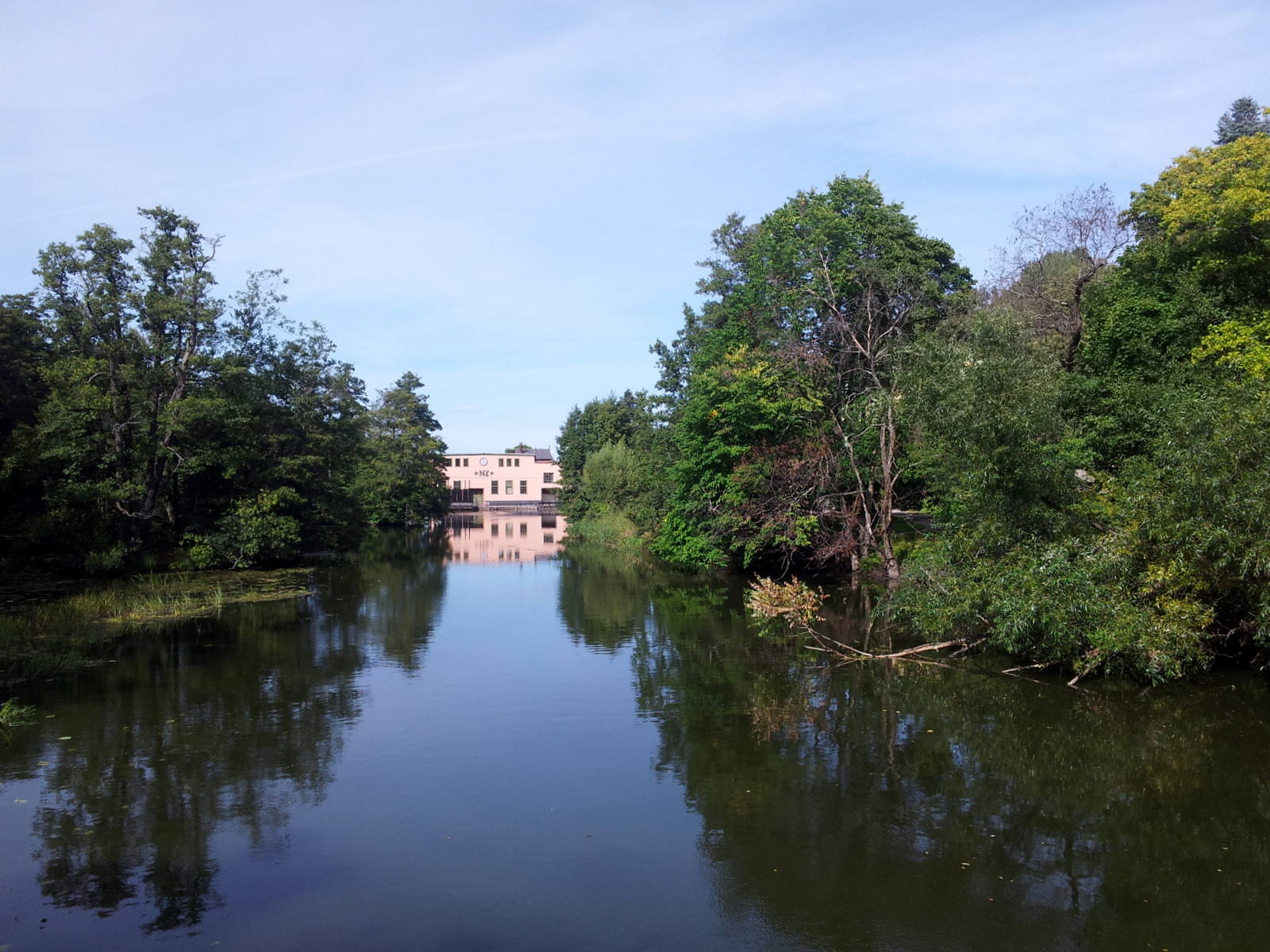
Power dam at Nyby

Nyby bruk in Eskilstuna Municipality, Södermanland County.

Nyby bruk (Nyby Mill) is a steel mill and former mill village, today part of Torshälla in Eskilstuna Municipality, Södermanland County, Sweden.

== History ==
Iron working on the lands of present-day Nyby is first mentioned in written sources from the 15th century.

Construction started on a canal through Nyby in the late 16th century during the administration of Charles, Duke of Södermanland, Närke and Värmland, later King Charles IX. The canal was approximately 2 kilometres long, had three locks and was constructed to circumvent the natural rapids in Torshällaån at Torshälla. However, the canal proved short-lived and gradually fell out of use during the first half of the 17th century due to lack of maintenance, but the stream thus left by the canal provided a natural source of water power. Some traces of the original locks and historical bridges remain along Nybyån.

The Nyby Ironworks was founded in 1829 by Adolf Zethelius on the lands of Nyby manor house west of Torshälla. The ironworks was constructed by Samuel Owen and a new manor house as well as cottages for the workers were built next to the ironworks. A mill village gradually formed around the ironworks.

The Norra Södermanlands Järnväg railway was connected to Nyby bruk in 1895. Passenger traffic was discontinued in 1933, after which the line has been used by the steel mill for freight traffic.

The Nyby village remained independent of the neighbouring town of Torshälla until 1952, when the two were merged.

== Modern day Nyby ==
Nyby bruk and Nyby-Uddeholm became part of the Avesta group in 1984, and after 1992 were part of the steel manufacturer Avesta Sheffield. Since 2002 the main production facilities at Nyby bruk have been owned by Finnish stainless steel manufacturer Outokumpu. Outokumpu operates a cold rolling mill at Nyby bruk.
