= Adolf Zethelius =

Swedish silversmith and industrialist

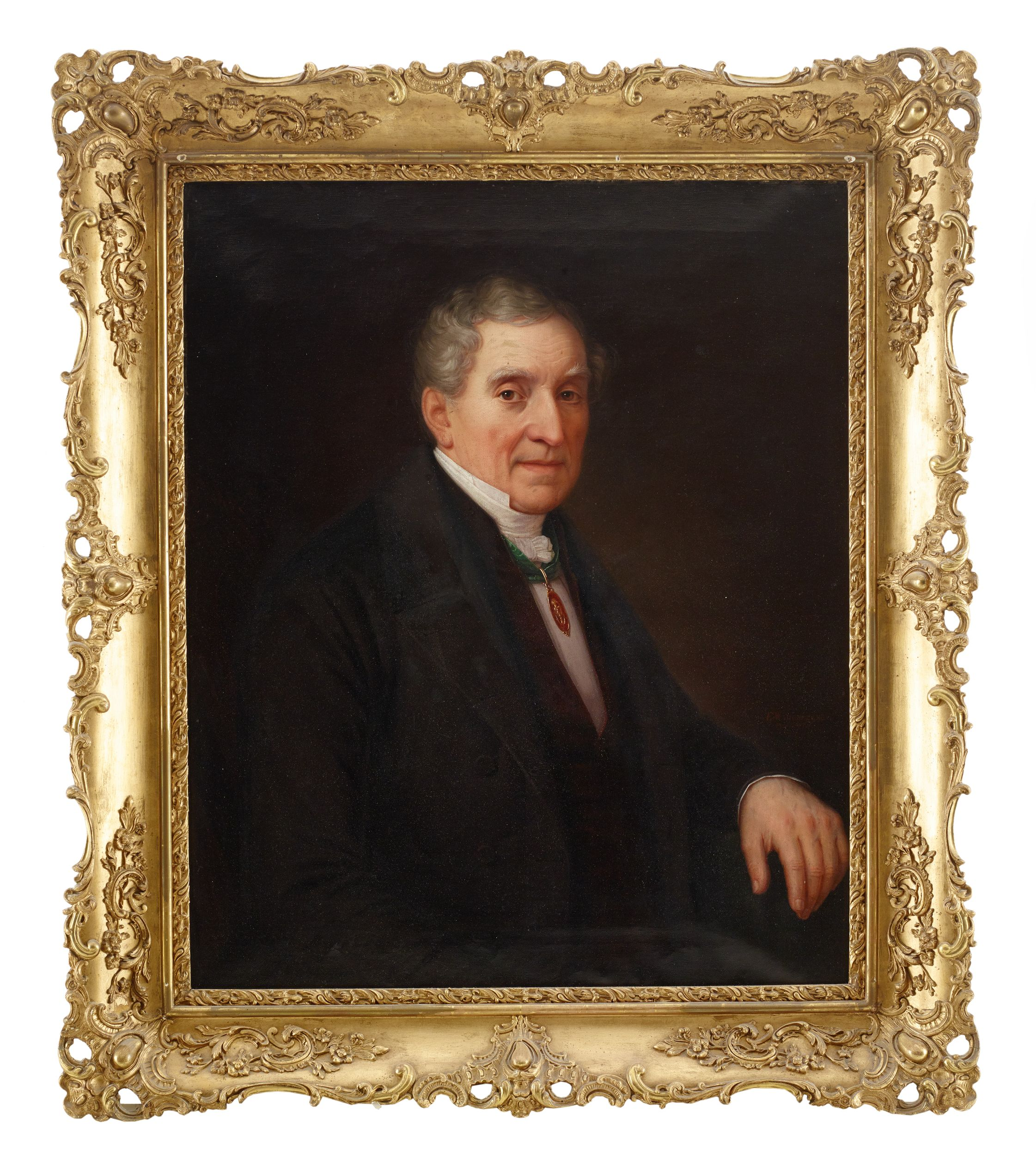
- Adolf Zethelius, with the Order of Vasa around his neck.
- Born: 19 February 1781; Stockholm
- Died: 7 March 1864 (aged 83); Stockholm
- Burial place: Torshälla Church graveyard
- Occupations: Silversmith and industrialist
- Notable work: Norwegian Royal Regalia, Nyby bruk, Surahammars bruk
- Style: Empire
- Spouse: Sofia Fredrika Nordewall (1786–1885)
- Children: Augusta Emerentia Carolina Zethelius (1811–1897) Carl Zethelius (1811–1860), mill owner and Royal Secretary. Fredrik Zethelius (1812–1887), mill owner. Wilhelm Zethelius (1815–1873), mill owner. Henrik Philibert Zethelius (1825–?).
- Parent: Silversmith Pehr Zethelius (1740–1810) Catharina Emerentia Westrell
- Relatives: Son-in-law of Eric Nordewall

Adolf Zethelius (born Erik Adolf Zethelius; 19 February 1781 – 7 March 1864) was a Swedish silversmith and industrialist and owner of the Swedish ironworks Surahammars bruk and Nyby bruk.

== Life and career ==
The orb, sceptre, and anointing horn, which are part of the Norwegian Royal Regalia, were commissioned by King Charles John and made by Zethelius in Stockholm for the King's coronation as King of Norway in 1818. Works by Zethelius are also exhibited at Nationalmuseum and Hallwyl Palace in Stockholm.

Zethelius acquired the manor house Nyby, near Torshälla, from his father-in-law Eric Nordewall, and in 1829 he founded the ironworks Nyby bruk on the site. Zethelius had the manor house of Surahammars herrgård constructed 1856–1858.
