= Hjälmaren =

Fourth largest lake in Sweden

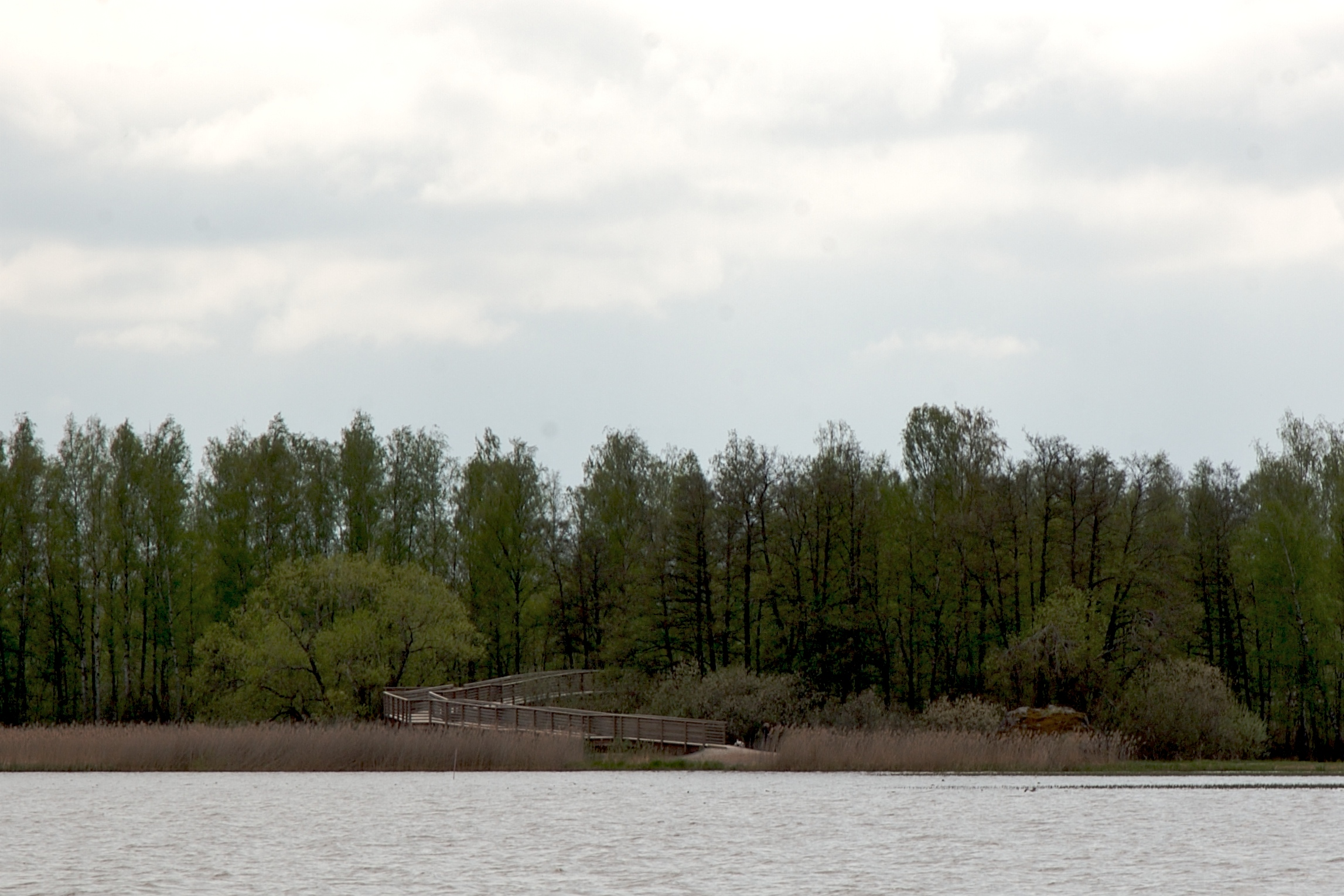

- Location within Sweden

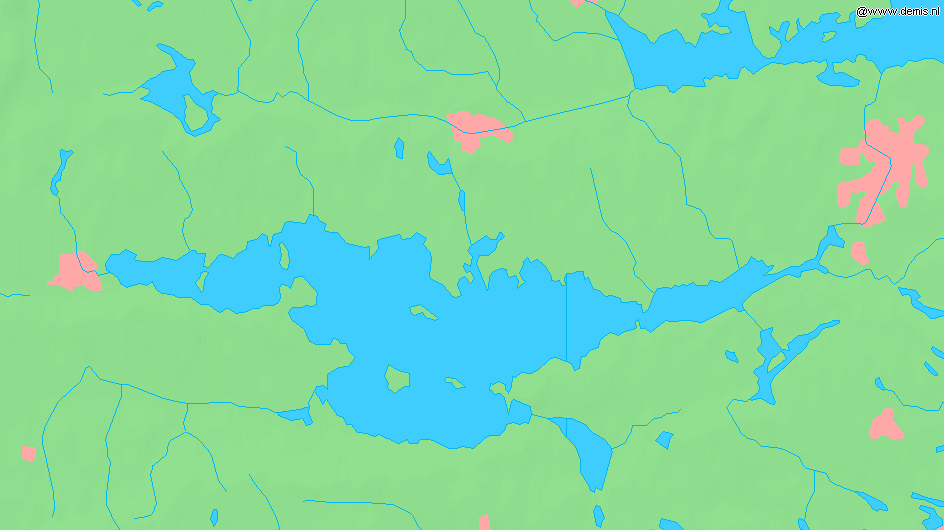
- Coordinates: 59°15′N 15°45′E
- Primary outflows: Eskilstunaån
- Basin countries: Sweden
- Max. length: 58 km (36 mi)
- Max. width: 18 km (11 mi)
- Surface area: 483 km^{2} (186 sq mi)
- Average depth: 6.2 m (20 ft)
- Max. depth: 20 m (66 ft)
- Water volume: 3 km^{3} (2,400,000 acre⋅ft)
- Settlements: Örebro

Hjälmaren (Swedish pronunciation: [ˈjɛ̂lːmarɛn] or [ˈjɛ̂lːmaɳ]), also spelled Jälmaren, is Sweden's fourth largest lake. It is situated in the Central Swedish lowland and drains through Eskilstunaån into the adjacent Lake Mälaren, which in turn drains into the Baltic Sea, west of Stockholm. It is connected by waterway with Stockholm by the 13 kilometres long Hjälmare kanal.

It is bounded by the provinces of Södermanland, Närke, and Västmanland.

Hjälmaren is 63 kilometres long, about 20 kilometres wide, and has an average depth of 6 metres, and a surface of 483 km^{2}. The largest towns around the lake is Örebro and Eskilstuna situated at the western and eastern ends of the lake.

Between 1878 and 1887, a damming project lowered the surface level of Hjälmaren 1.3 metres (4.3 ft) to free up land for agriculture and to reduce the risk of flooding.

Rebel Engelbrekt Engelbrektsson was assassinated in 1436 at Engelbrektsholmen, an islet in Lake Hjälmaren.

== See also ==
- Lakes of Sweden
