= Blacken (basin) =

Coordinates: 59°28′N 16°32′E

Blacken is a basin in Lake Mälaren, the third-largest lake in Sweden. It is located in the western portion of the lake.
