= Eskilstunaån =

Eskilstunaån Torshällaån
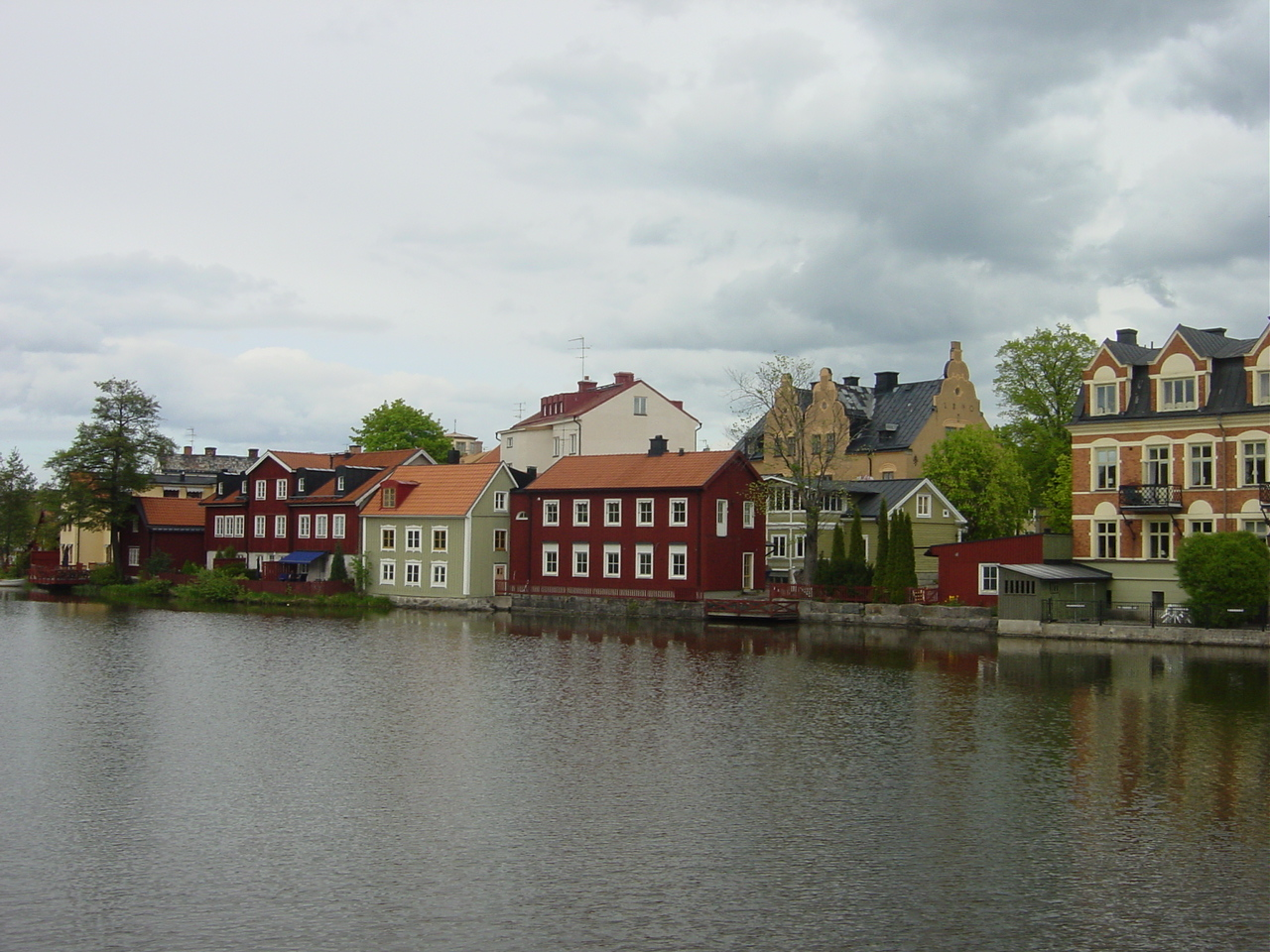

Location
- Country: Sweden
- County: Södermanland County
- Municipality: Eskilstuna Municipality

Physical characteristics
- Source: Hjälmaren
  - coordinates: 59°16′17″N 16°17′35″E
  - elevation: 22 m (72 ft)
- Mouth: Mälaren
  - coordinates: 59°26′50″N 16°29′15″E
  - elevation: 0.7 m (2 ft 4 in)
- Length: 32 km (20 mi)
- Basin size: 4,187 km^{2} (1,617 sq mi)
- Discharge
  - average: 24 m^{3}/s (850 cu ft/s)
  - maximum: 110 m^{3}/s (3,900 cu ft/s)

Eskilstunaån (Eskilstuna River) is a small river in Sweden, length 32 km, running through the city of Eskilstuna and the town of Torshälla in Södermanland County. The river drains Lake Hjälmaren into Lake Mälaren. It is by local custom alternatively referred to as Torshällaån (Torshälla River) in its lower course from Torshälla to Lake Mälaren.

Eskilstuna and Torshälla Canal was completed in its present form in 1860 to connect Lake Mälaren with the industrial city of Eskilstuna through Eskilstunaån, and three locks which circumvent the rapids in Eskilstuna and Torshälla. Due to the building of low bridges in the 1960s it is currently only partially navigable between Lake Mälaren and Eskilstuna for vessels with low clearance.
