= Mälaren =

Third largest lake in Sweden

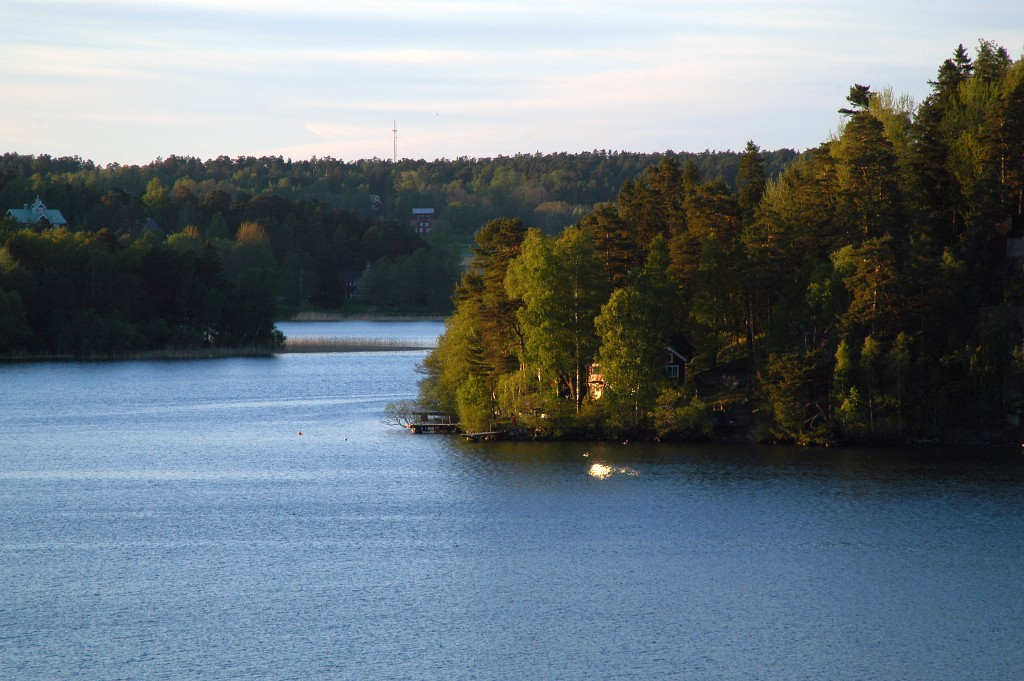
- Lake Mälaren at dusk

- Location within Sweden
- Location: Sweden
- Coordinates: 59°30′N 17°12′E
- Primary outflows: Norrström
- Basin countries: Sweden
- Surface area: 1,140 km^{2} (440 sq mi)
- Average depth: 13 m (43 ft)
- Max. depth: 64 m (210 ft)
- Water volume: 14 km^{3} (11,000,000 acre⋅ft)
- Surface elevation: 0.7 metres (2.3 ft)
- Islands: Selaön, Svartsjölandet (see list)

Mälaren (UK: /ˈmɛlərɛn/ MEL-ər-en, US: /ˈmeɪlɑːrən/ MAY-lar-ən, Swedish: [ˈmɛ̂ːlarɛn] or [ˈmɛ̂ːlaɳ]), historically referred to as Lake Malar in English, is the third-largest freshwater lake in Sweden (after Vänern and Vättern). Its area is 1,140 km^{2} (440 sq mi) and its greatest depth is 64 m (210 ft). Mälaren spans 120 km (74.6 mi) from east to west. The lake drains, from south-west to north-east, into the Baltic Sea through its natural outlets Norrström and Söderström (as it flows around Stadsholmen island) and through the artificial Södertälje Canal and Hammarbyleden waterway. The easternmost bay of Mälaren, in central Stockholm, is called Riddarfjärden. The lake is located in Svealand and bounded by the provinces of Uppland, Södermanland and Västmanland. The two largest islands in Mälaren are Selaön (91 km^{2} (35.1 sq mi)) and Svartsjölandet (79 km^{2} (30.5 sq mi)). Mälaren is low-lying and mostly relatively shallow.

Being a quite narrow and shallow lake, Mälaren has bridge crossings between Eskilstuna and Västerås with two crossings on the western end at Kvicksund and three separate bridges between Strängnäs and Enköping in the central part of the lake. On the eastern end, the entirety of Ekerö Municipality is set on islands within Mälaren. That urban area also has a bridge connection to the mainland in Stockholm along with bridges between various islands in the municipality.

The Viking Age settlements of Birka on the island of Björkö and Hovgården on the neighbouring island of Adelsö have been a UNESCO World Heritage Site since 1993, as has Drottningholm Palace on the island of Lovön. The barrow of Björn Ironside is on the island of Munsö, within the lake.

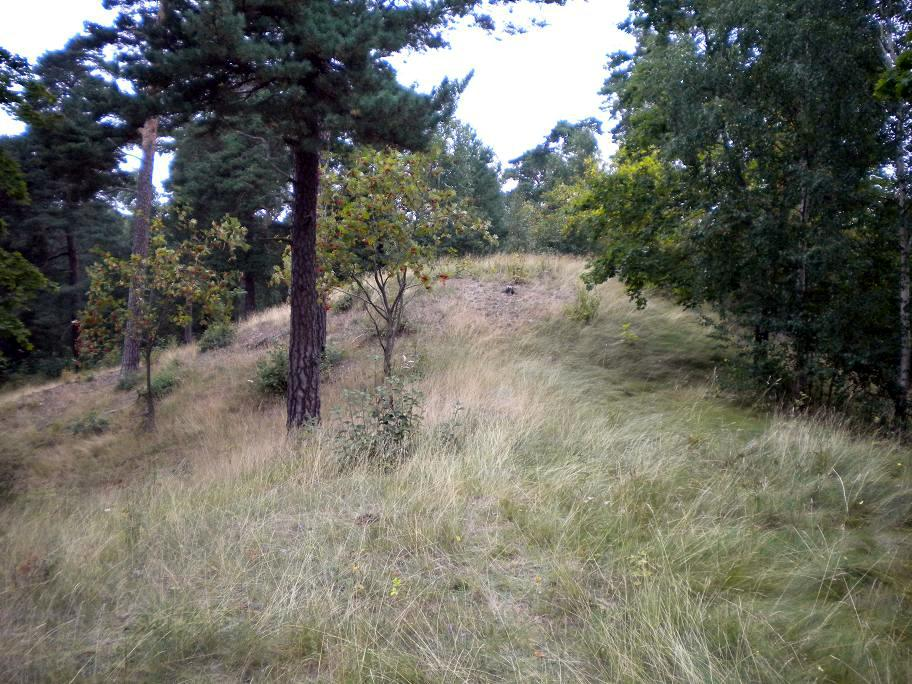
The barrow of Björn Ironside (Björn Järnsidas hög) on the island of Munsö, in lake Mälaren, Sweden. The barrow is crowned by a stone containing the fragmented Uppland Runic Inscription 13.

== Etymology ==
The etymological origin of the name Mälaren stems from the Old Norse word mælir appearing in historical records in the 1320s and meaning gravel. The lake was previously known as Lǫgrinn, which is Old Norse for 'The Lake'.

== Geology ==
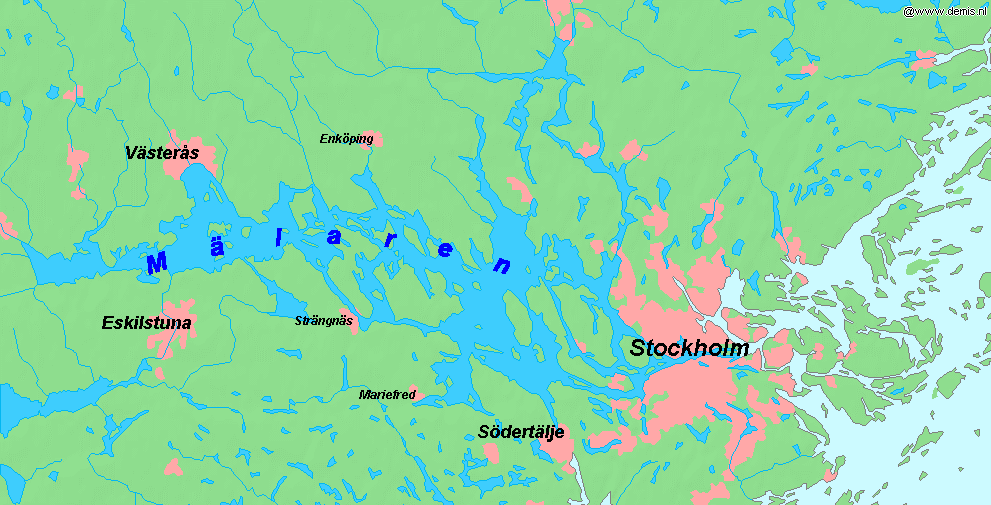
Mälaren details, with Stockholm urban area to the right in pink.

By the end of the last ice age about 11,000 years ago, much of northern Europe and North America was covered by ice sheets up to 3 km (1.9 mi) thick. At the end of the ice age when the glaciers retreated, the removal of the weight from the depressed land led to a post-glacial rebound. Initially, the rebound was rapid, proceeding at about 7.5 cm (2.95 in) per year. This phase lasted for about 2,000 years, and took place as the ice was being unloaded. Once deglaciation was complete, uplift slowed to about 2.5 cm (1.0 in) per year, and decreased exponentially after that. Today, typical uplift rates are of the order of 1 cm (0.39 in) per year or less, and studies suggest that rebound will continue for about another 10,000 years. The total uplift from the end of deglaciation can be up to 400 m (1,312 ft).

In the Viking Age, Mälaren was still a bay of the Baltic Sea, and seagoing vessels could sail up it far into the interior of Sweden. Birka was conveniently near the trade routes through the Södertälje Canal. Due to the post-glacial rebound, Södertälje canal and the mouth of Riddarfjärden bay had become so shallow by about the year 1200 that ships had to unload their cargoes near the entrances, and progressively the bay became a lake. The decline of Birka and the subsequent foundation of Stockholm at the choke point of Riddarfjärden were in part due to the post-glacial rebound changing the topography of the Mälaren basin. The lake's surface currently averages .7 m (2.3 ft) above sea level.

== Mythology ==
According to Norse mythology as contained in the thirteenth-century Icelandic work Prose Edda, the lake was created by the goddess Gefjon when she tricked Gylfi, the Swedish king of Gylfaginning. Gylfi promised Gefjon as much land as four oxen could plough in a day and a night, but she used oxen from the land of the giants, and uprooted the land and dragged it into the sea, where it became the island of Zealand. Snorra Edda says that "the inlets in the lake correspond to the headlands in Zealand"; since modern maps show this to be more true of Lake Vänern, the myth has been suggested to have been originally about Vänern, not Mälaren.

== Geography ==
A selection, in alphabetical order:

Major islands
- Adelsö
- Aspön
- Björkö
- Ekerön
- Helgö
- Kungsholmen (Stockholm)
- Kurön
- Lilla Essingen (Stockholm)
- Lovön
- Munsön
- Ridön (Västmanland)
- Ridön (Södermanland)
- Selaön
- Stora Essingen (Stockholm)
- Svartsjölandet
- Tosterön
Major sections from west to east
- Galten
- Blacken
- Långtarmen
- Freden
- Västeråsfjärden
- Granfjärden
- Oknöfjärden
- Gripsholmsfjärden
- Prästfjärden
- Björkfjärden
- Ekoln
- Gorran & Skarven
- Östra Mälaren
Major cities and municipalities bordering the lake
- Bålsta
- Köping
- Kungsängen
- Kungsör
- Mariefred
- Stockholm
- Strängnäs
- Södertälje
- Torshälla
- Uppsala
- Västerås

== Ecology ==
The most common nesting birds on the skerries of Mälaren are also the most common in the Baltic Sea. After a survey in 2005, the ten most common species were found to be common tern, herring gull, black-headed gull, common gull, mallard, tufted duck, Canada goose, common goldeneye, lesser black-backed gull and common sandpiper. White-tailed eagle, greylag goose, barnacle goose, black-throated diver, red-breasted merganser and gadwall are less common, and some of these latter are endangered in the Mälaren area. Since 1994 a subspecies of great cormorant Phalacrocorax carbo sinensis, has nested there as well. A 2005 survey tallied 23 breeding colonies with 2178 nests, of which the largest colony had 235 nests. Most experts believe the great cormorant population has peaked and will stabilize at around 2000 nests.

One of the characteristic species is the osprey which has one of its strongest presences in Lake Mälaren. The osprey nests in almost all bays of the lake.

The Zebra mussel is considered an invasive species and is causing some problems in Lake Mälaren.

Lake Mälaren has 33 species of naturally occurring fish species, which makes it Sweden’s most diverse lake in regard to fish. Other species have been introduced to the environment, including the common carp and the rainbow trout. The rainbow trout in particular is known to compete with indigenous fish for habitat and food, as they have a faster growth rate and predate on local species. However, they are not considered to have made a significant impact.

=== Crayfish ===
Crayfish are of large cultural and economic importance in Sweden, with crayfish parties being a longtime annual tradition for many Swedes.

Lake Mälaren was the first lake in Sweden to be affected by the crayfish plague (A. astaci Schicora) when infected crayfish imported from Finland were introduced to the lake with the intention of human consumption. The plague spread quickly through the lake, exacerbated by boat traffic, which decimated the indigenous noble crayfish (A. astacus) population and caused severe economic losses to the local fishing industry. From Mälaren, the plague spread rapidly to all freshwater bodies in Sweden.

After multiple recurrent outbreaks and failed attempts to restore populations of the noble crayfish, Swedish authorities introduced the North American signal crayfish (P. leniusculus) to L. Mälaren, a species that is resistant to the plague. Since 1969, Mälaren has been continuously stocked with signal crayfish. However, it was later discovered that signal crayfish were often carriers of crayfish plague. In addition, while populations of noble crayfish and signal crayfish have been known to coexist, their larger size, faster growth rate, and aggressiveness often allows them to dominate populations of noble crayfish. This, in addition to habitat degradation, has led to a significant decrease in noble crayfish populations in L. Mälaren.

Signal crayfish have been largely successful in Sweden and rapidly expanded as a replacement population to noble crayfish. Stocking this species is now prohibited within multiple lakes in Sweden in order to protect noble crayfish population. In the Stockholm municipality, which includes L. Mälaren, signal crayfish are now illegal to import, move, or farm. There have been efforts to encourage farming of noble crayfish populations instead. However, illegal farming of signal crayfish continues to be a problem due to greater public demand for the larger signal crayfish.

== Mapping ==
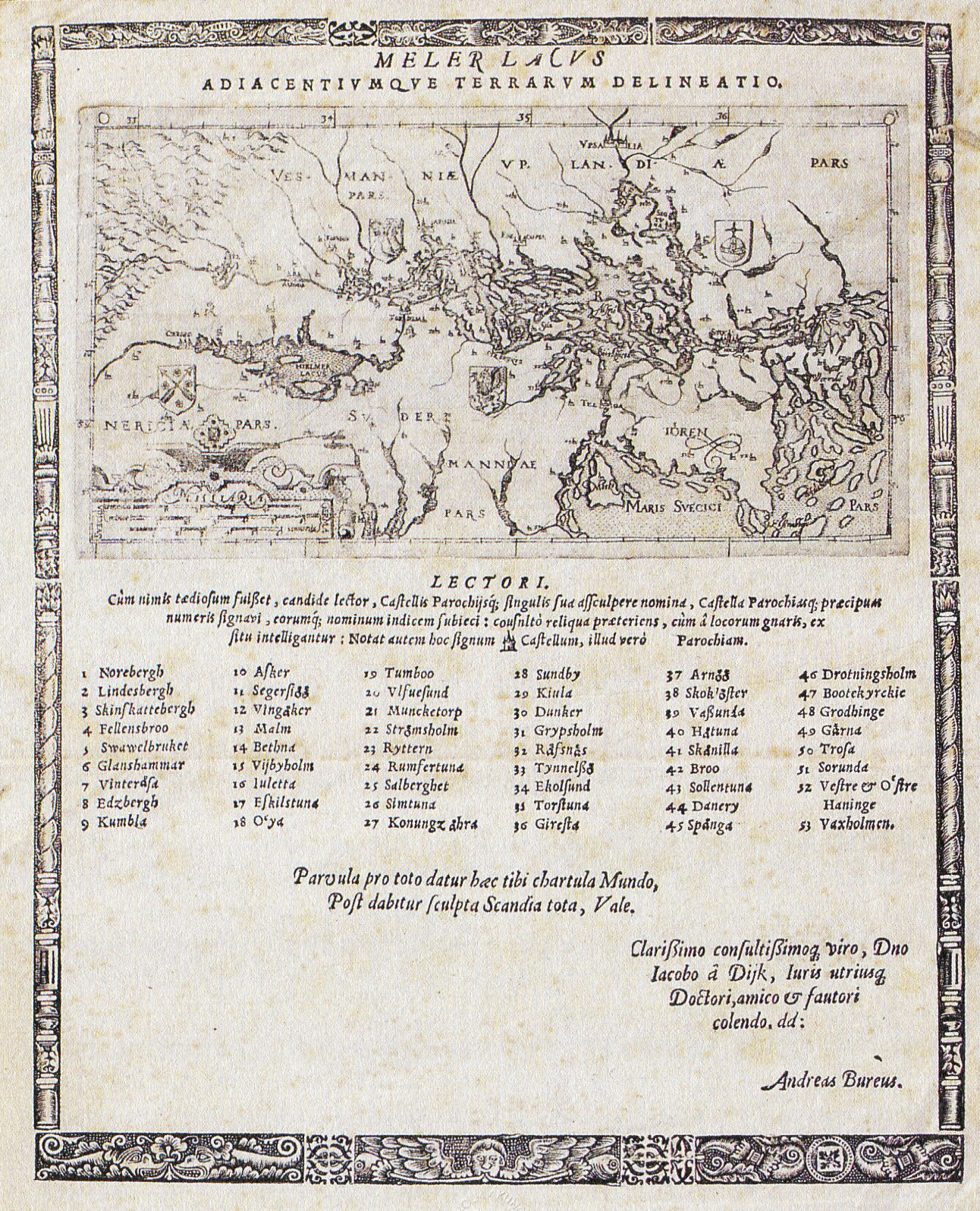
One of the earliest maps of the lake, made by cartographer Anders Bure in 1614

From the mid 17th century onwards, multiple expeditions to measure and map lake Mälaren were undertaken. The lake was strategically and economically important, and there was a lack of a reliable map to navigate it. However, L. Mälaren’s many islands and bays made it an extensive and laborious task to measure.

In 1687, King Charles XI of Sweden commissioned cartographer Carl Gripenhielm to map Lake Mälaren and its surrounding provinces. From 2 August 1688 to 17 September 1688 Gripenhielm conducted the bulk of his expedition, and he would complete the map in 1689, known in Swedish as Gripenhielm's Mälarkarta. The Mälarkarta is unique in that it is surrounded by a frame of 96 small, realistic gouache paintings of cities, castles, mansions, and fairways around Lake Mälaren. The map is hand drawn on regal paper, and measures 3.46 m × 2.14 m (11.4 ft × 7.0 ft). It has been kept in the National Library of Sweden since 1884. Due to its larger size, it was initially hung in the large viewing room, however in 1931 it was moved to a more secluded wall in a corridor to the map department. Heavy handed preservation techniques have led to some degradation on the illustrations. Since 1961, the map hangs in an area that the public does not have access to.

Gripenheim’s Mälarkarta was valid until 1739 when a new, more accurate map of L. Mälaren was completed by the then surveyor and cartographer Jacob Nordencreutz.

== Trivia ==
- Mälardrottningen (Lake Mälar Queen) is a poetic name for Stockholm well known in Swedish literature.
- Utter Inn, an underwater hotel designed by the artist Mikael Genberg, is in the lake.
- The area around the lake hosted the cycling events at the 1912 Summer Olympics.

== See also ==
- Mälaren Valley (Mälardalen)
- List of lakes of Sweden
- Geography of Stockholm
- Almarestäket
- Kanaanbadet
