= Norwegian police troops in Sweden during World War II =

Military force in World War II

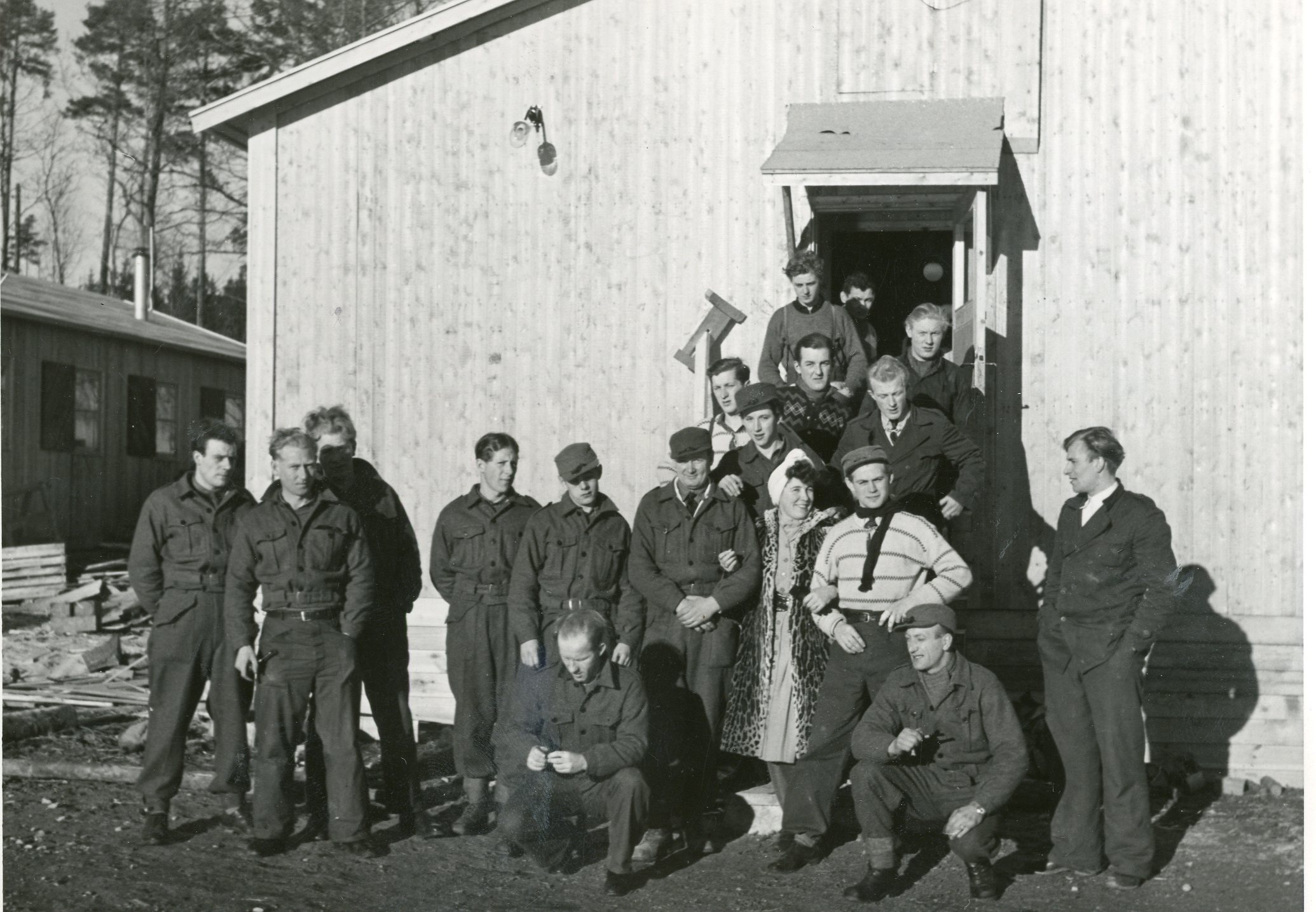
Norwegian police troops at barracks in Sweden.

The Norwegian police troops in Sweden during World War II consisted of around 15,000 men, recruited from Norwegian refugees and trained at a number of secret camps in Sweden.

== Background ==
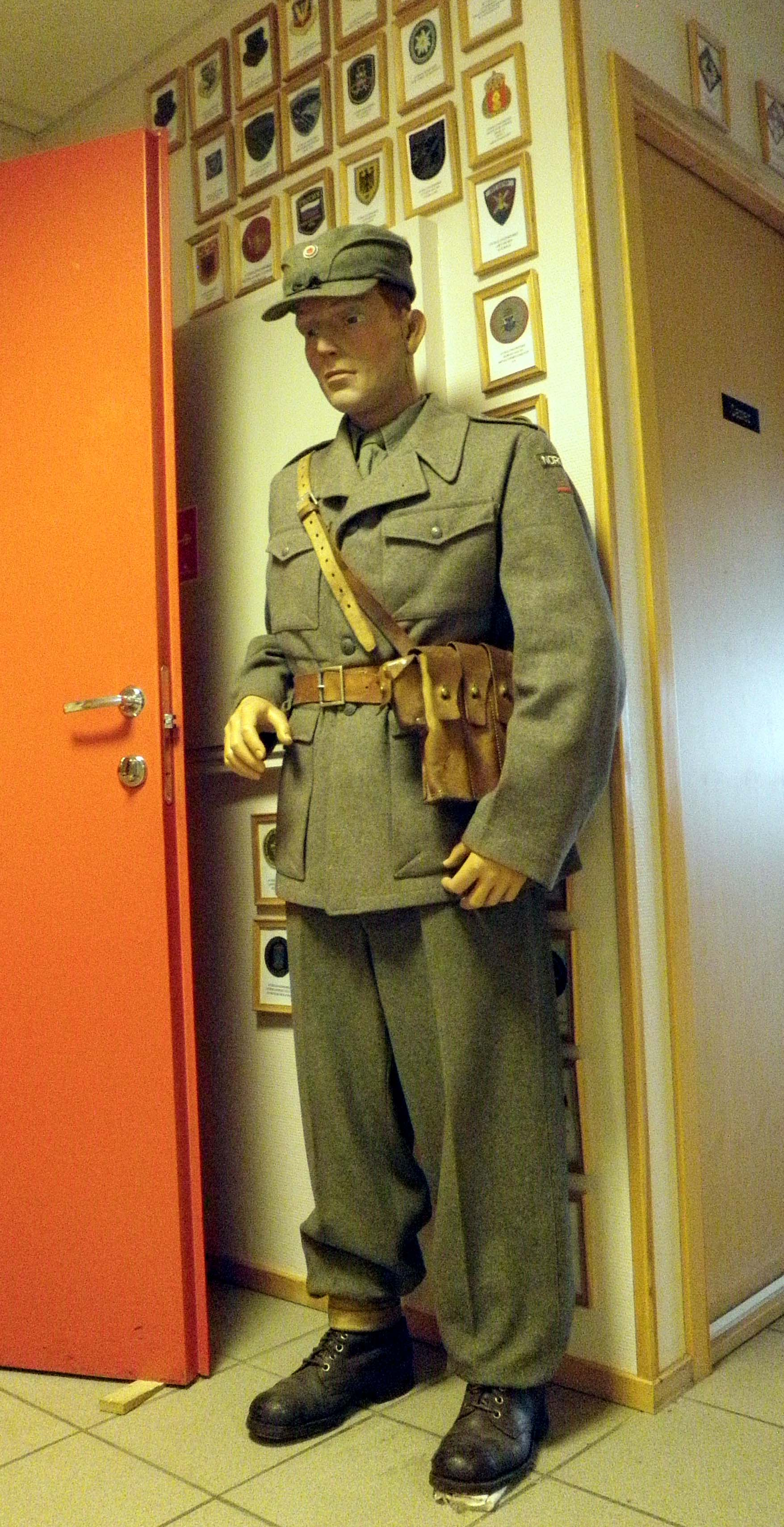
Norwegian police troops uniform

During the occupation of Norway by Nazi Germany many Norwegians fled to neutral and unoccupied Sweden to escape the occupiers. Nearly 50,000 registered refugees arrived in Sweden during the war years. In 1942 head of the Swedish National Laboratory of Forensic Science, Harry Söderman, made a visit to London, where he met the exiled Norwegian Minister of Justice Terje Wold. Wold asked Söderman about the possibilities for training Norwegian policemen in Sweden. Söderman himself was positive, but due to Sweden's neutrality policy such a task was not possible in 1942. In February 1943, when the number of Norwegian refugees had steadily increased, there was a contact between Söderman and Olav Svendsen, head of the legal office at the Norwegian legation in Stockholm, and the two then agreed on a plan to start a course for training fifty Norwegian policemen. These policemen were to support the expected legal investigations needed after the war. Svendsen was responsible for getting funding from the Norwegian exile government in London, while Söderman received approval from the Swedish Minister of Social Affairs Gustav Möller.

== Training ==
The first course for 20 policemen started in Stockholm 1 July 1943, and further courses were held over time. The plan was to train policemen who could participate in the legal purge in Norway after the war. Another course was held at the manor Johannesberg, north of Stockholm, for training uniformed police. Around 1,500 men were trained here, and their education included use of weapons and military training. Among the driving forces in the planning phase were, in addition to Söderman, surgeon Carl Semb, who had organized "health camps" where the refugees were classified, and Ole Berg, military attaché at the Norwegian legation. Funding and other details were discussed by the Norwegian government-in-exile in London.

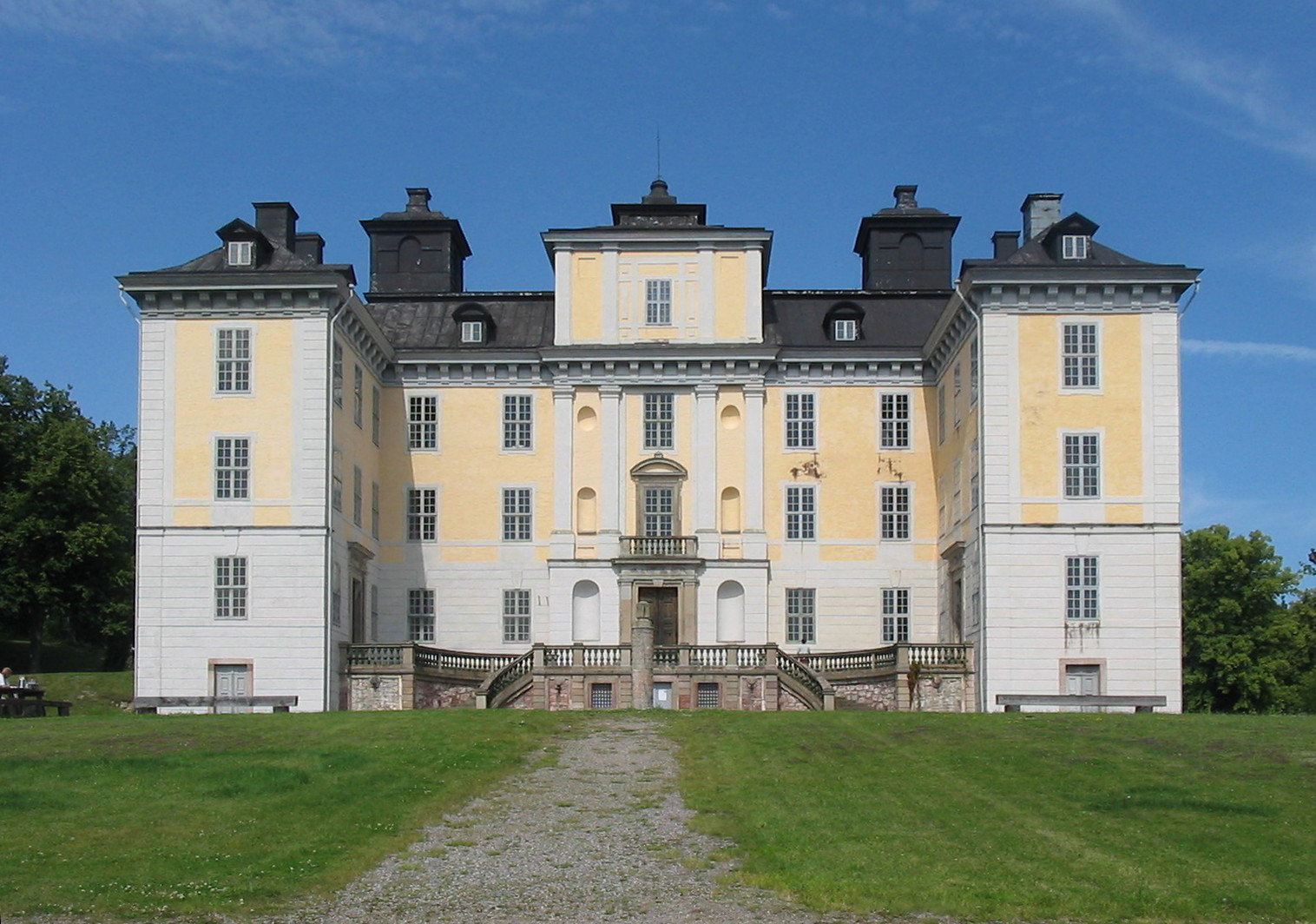
Mälsåker Castle in 2007

The Swedish Government was not officially informed of the plans for training Norwegian police troops until 2 November 1943, although Minister Möller had been involved in the preparations. On 3 December 1943 the Swedish Government officially allowed the training of 8,000 reserve troops and 1,500 ordinary police troops. The training should take place in separate camps, and the maximum number of troops in each camp was limited to 500, excluding administration and catering staff. Shooting practice was allowed in four camps, and weapons should be available for one third of the troops. The duration of the training was limited to three months. Harry Söderman was appointed as responsible for the training of Norwegian police troops.

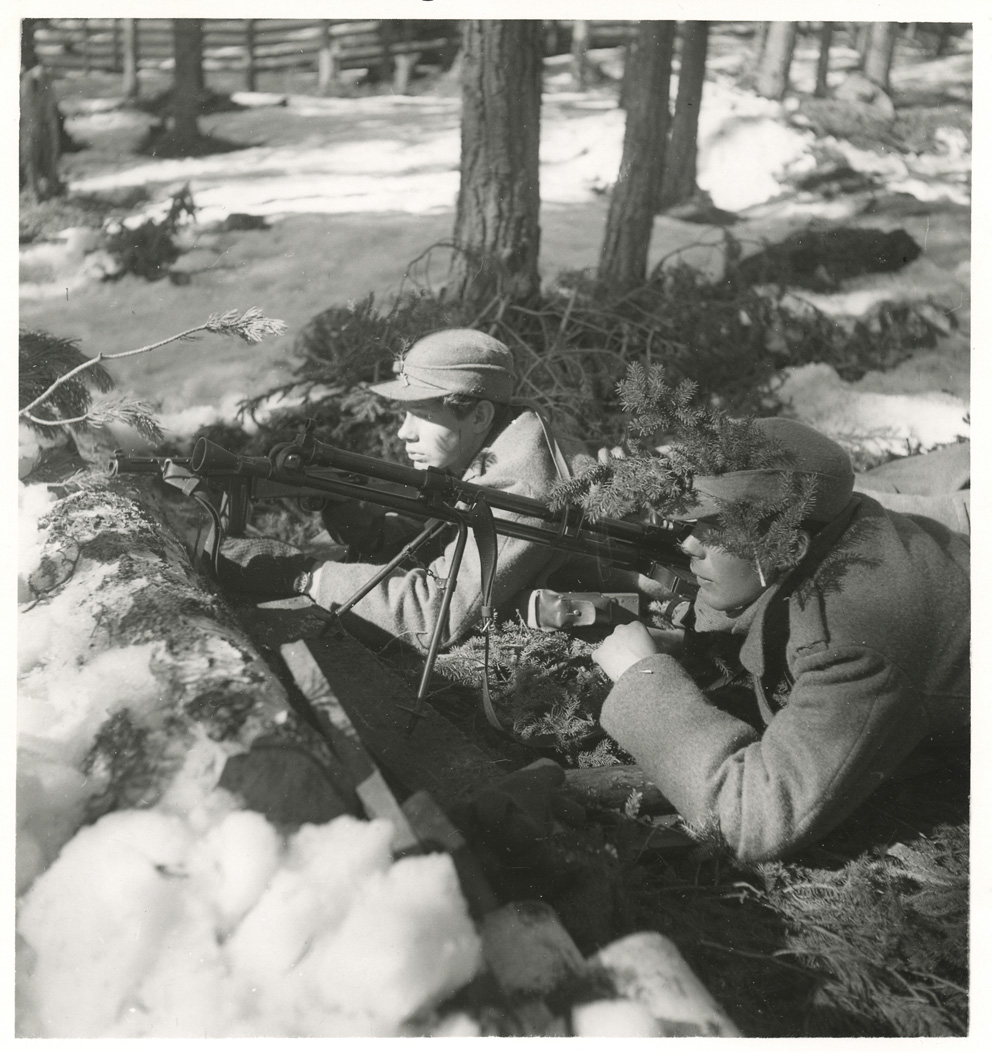
Polistrupper i övning

== Camps ==
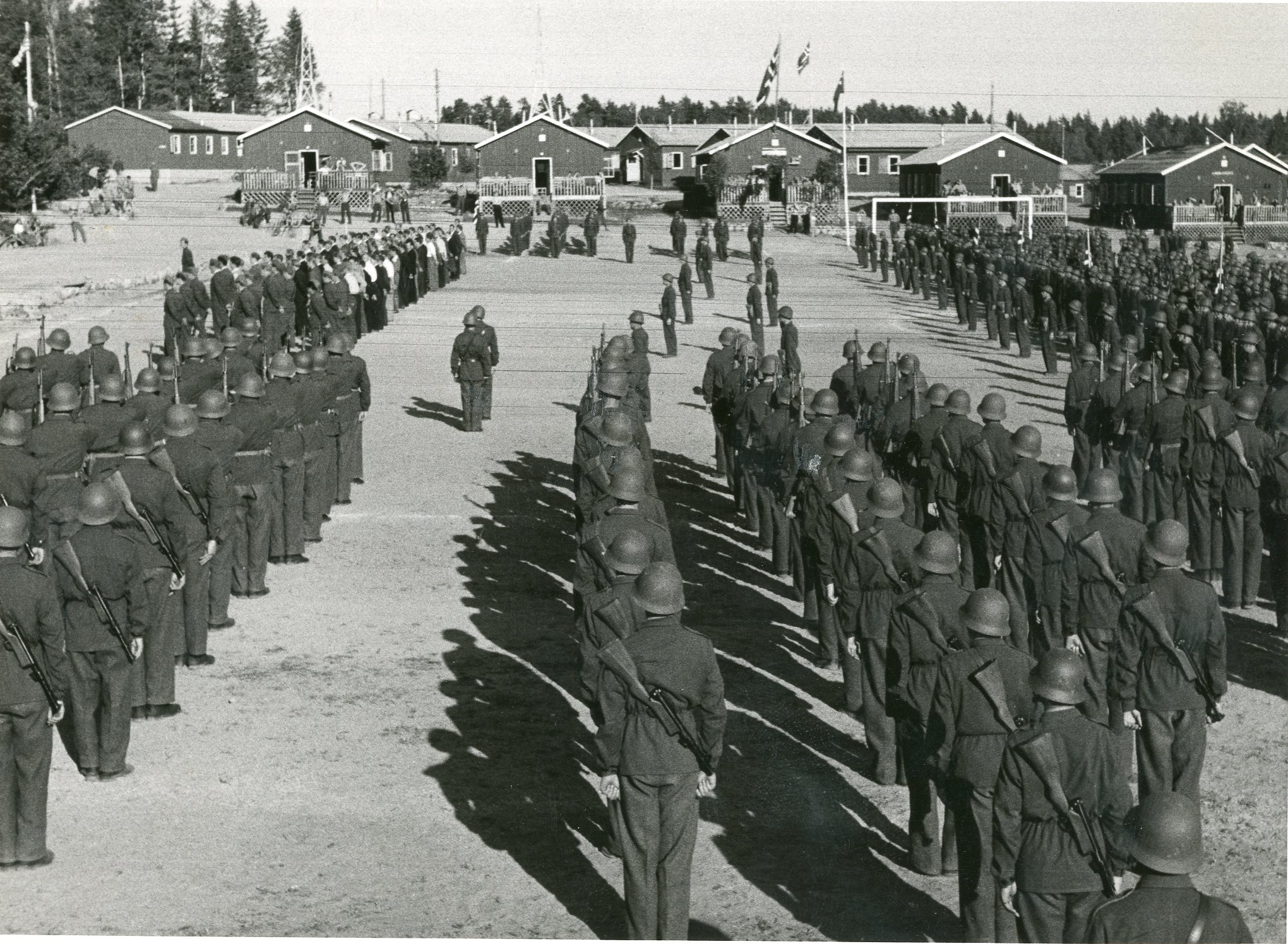
Gottröra Camp 1944. The Norwegian police troops are armed with Swedish Kpist M/37-39.

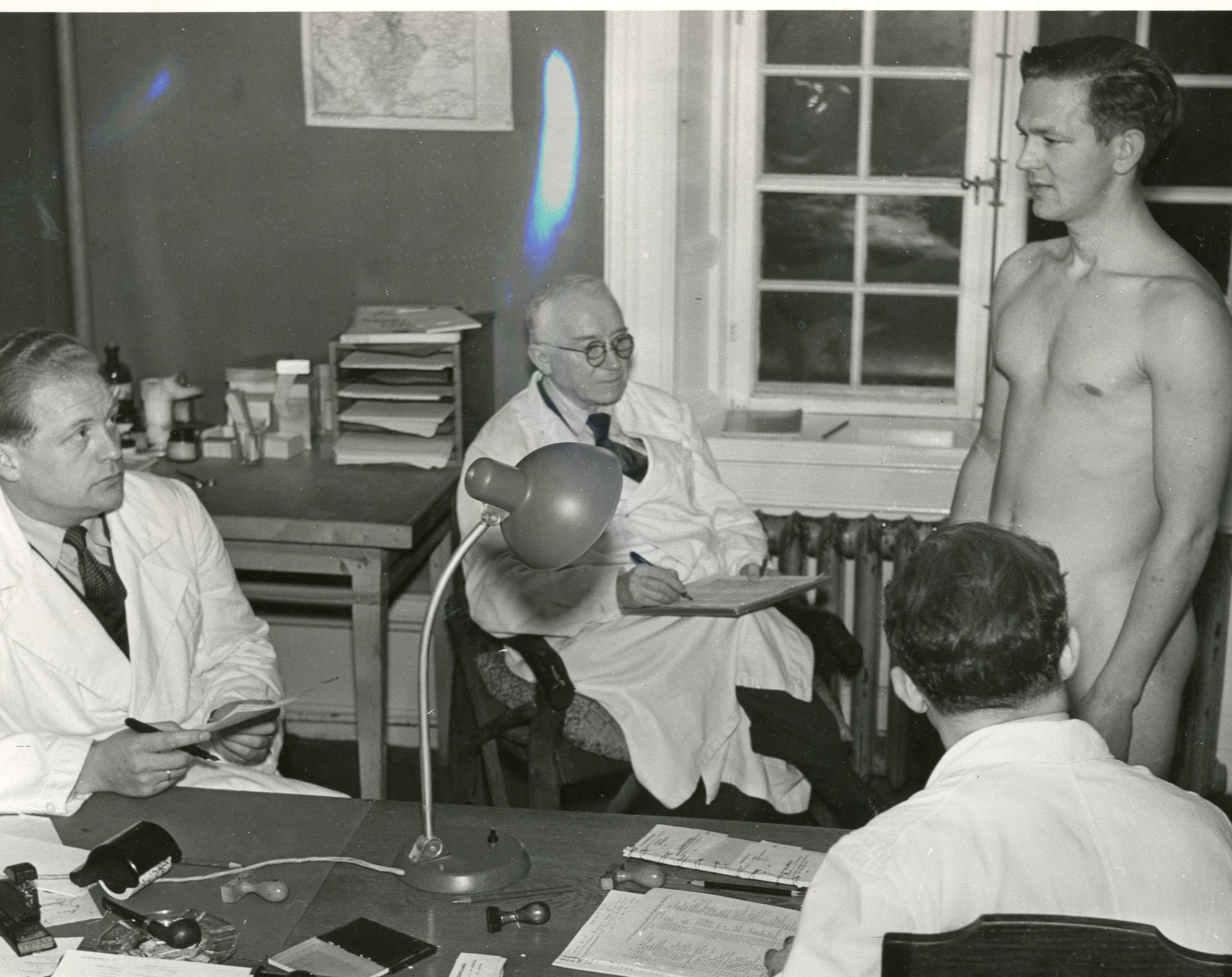
Medical examination for the police troops at Kjesäter.

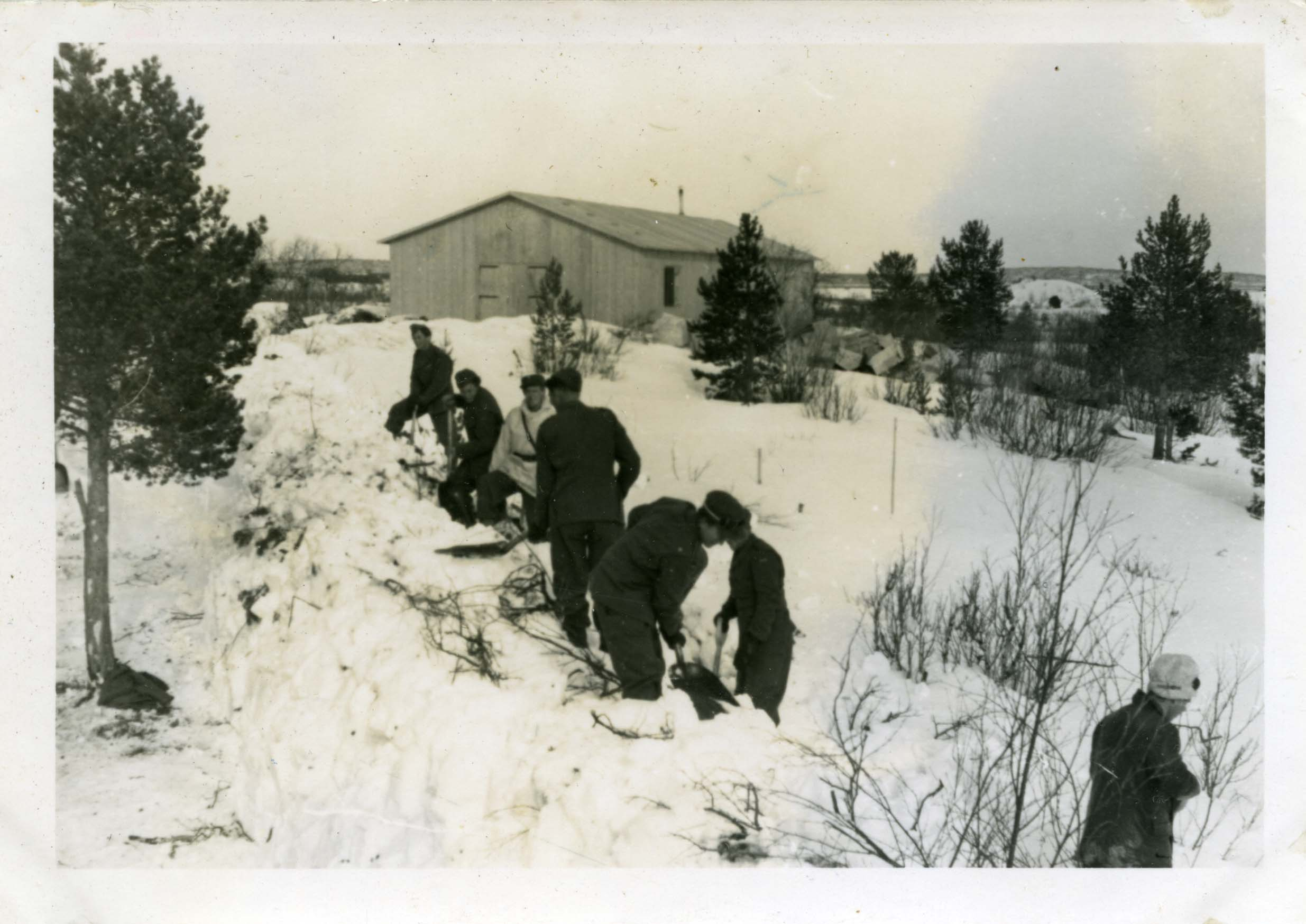
Camp Finse 1944. Waiting to liberate Norway.

The Swedish government allowed only four camps for weapons training. These were Mälsåker, Bäckehagen (outside Falun), Färnabruk and Älgberget. A number of other camps were established at various locations for the training of reserve troops. The original list included the farm Toresta, Mauritzberg Castle, Öreryd and Mossebo, Stråtenbo Manor, Tofta, Tappudden, Skålmyra and Holmarudden. Training of ordinary police troops continued at Gottröra. A camp for Danish police troops was located in Sofielund.

- Battalion I. Övertorneå. Commanding Officer (CO): Odd Mølster
- Battalion II. Övertorneå
- Battalion III. Baggböle, Njurunda. CO: Captain Ola Tvedt
- Battalion IV. Öreryd. CO: Axel Baumann
- Battalion V. Övertorneå. CO: Major Oliver Smith
- Battalion VI. Bäckehagen, outside of Falun
- Battalion VII. Skålmyra and Tappudden, Furudal. CO: Niclas Baumann
- Battalion VIII. Skålmyra, Furudal
- Battalion IX. Tappudden, Furudal (not ready before the end of the war)
- Finnmark Battalion. Färna, Skinnskatteberg
- Gunnery Range and Command School, later Artillery training. Mälsåker, Stallarholmen
- Coastal Artillery (Harbor Police) and radio signal personnel. Mauritzberg, Vikbolandet
- HS-Battalion, weapons training, training of medical personnel and Milorg-specialists. Älgberget, north of Björbo.
- Medical personnel. Stråtenbo, NNE Borlänge
- Discipline and Mustering Camp. Tofta brunn, Sundborn
- Section I (Long-distance radio and telegraphy). Mossebo, outside Öreryd
- Commando training camp (Forward Travel). Ählby, Ekerö, CO: Lieutenant Kristen Aasen, SOE (Kompani Linge)
- Training of vehicle mechanics, drivers, motorcycle orderlies, and female personnel. Berga, Turinge
- Stableman and signalmen. Holmarudden, Erikslund, west of Ånge
- Rikspolitiet (National Constabulary) and general staff officers. Johannesberg, Gottröra
- Command, signal and weapon mechanic training. Runsten, Johannesberg, Gottröra
- Military K9-training. Stora Fors, Gottröra
- Flight Cadets. Skarpnäck, Stockholm
- Paratroopers and radio telegraphist. Norrbotten Wing, Kallax
- Reception Center, Interrogation and Recruitment Office for the Police Troops and SOE. Kjesäters slott, Vingåker
- Camp Finse (2,000 soldiers for Finnmark). Karesuando
- Pioneers (Engineers). Voxna, Ovanåker
- Traffic Regulation and Patrol Cars. Åkeshov, outside of Stockholm

== Liberation of Finnmark ==
From 12 January 1945 the troops participated in the operations in Finnmark. In total around 1,300 police troops were involved. This operation was decided by the British government.

== End of World War II ==
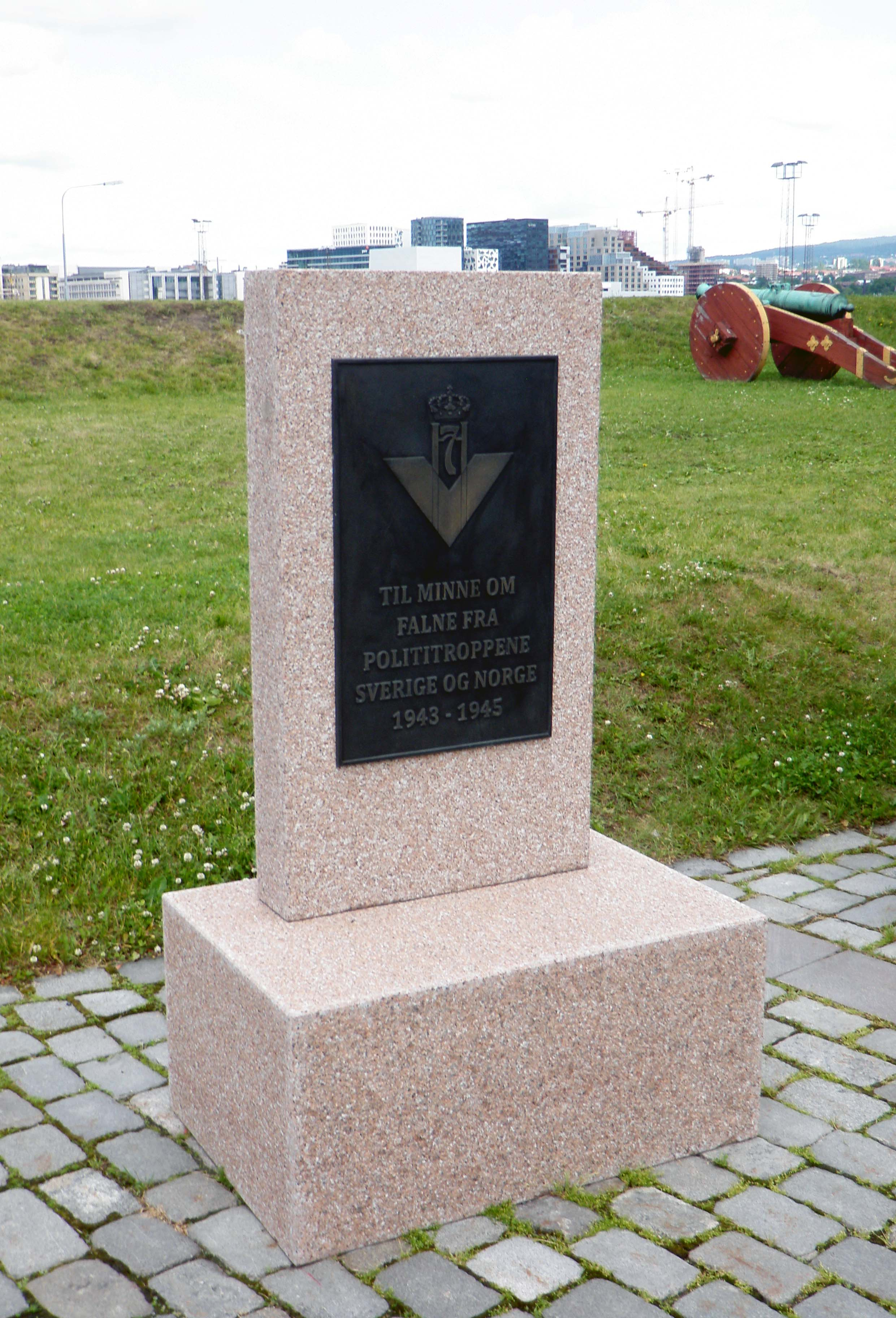
Memorial at Akershus Fortress to police troops who lost their lives during World War II.

In May 1945 the police troops - taking with them about one month of supplies - were transferred to Norway to help with keeping order and arresting collaborators following the German capitulation.

== See also ==
- Danish Brigade in Sweden
