= Mälsåker Castle =

Mälsåker Manor House
- Strängnäs Municipality, Sweden
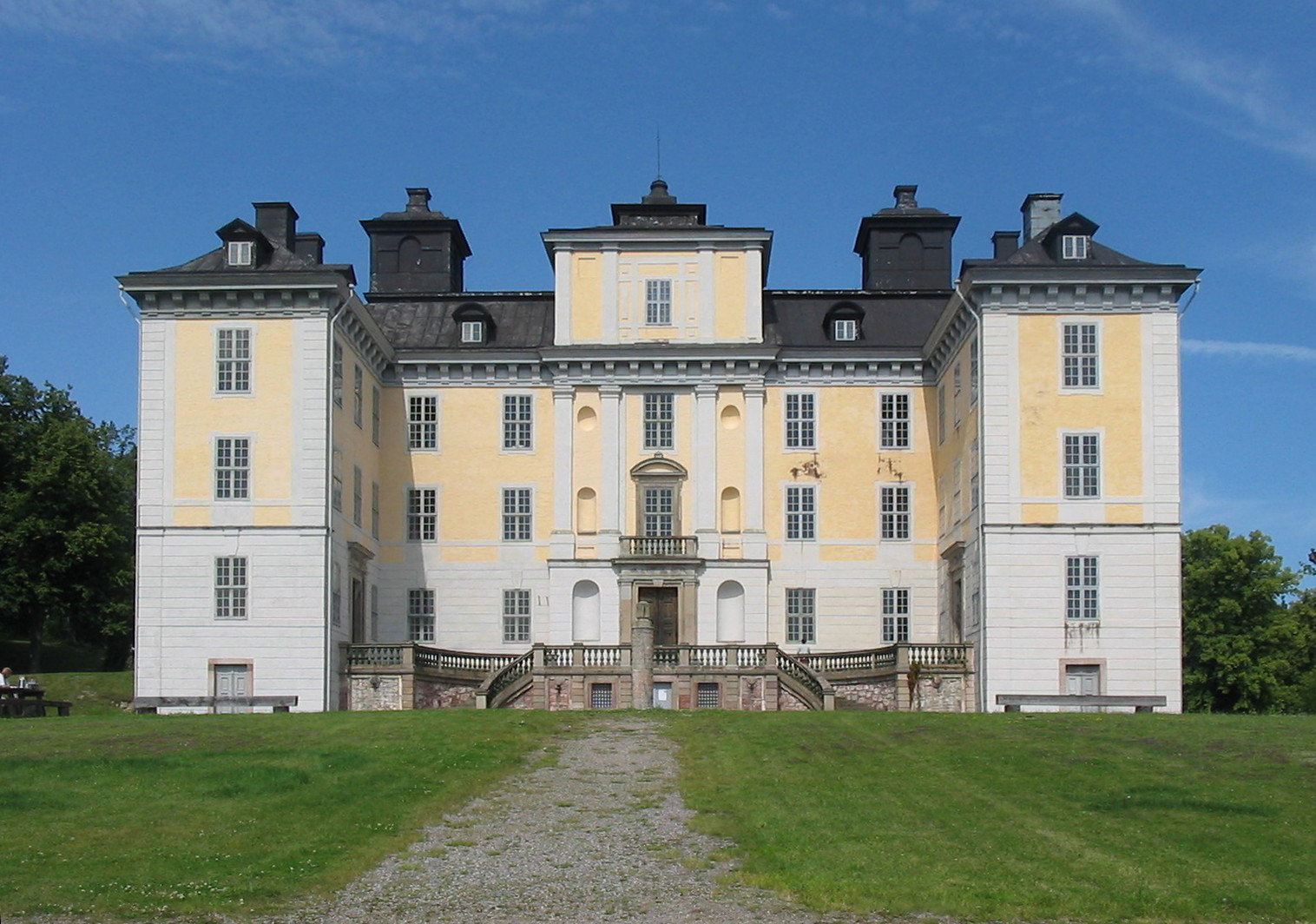
- Mälsåkers slott

Location
- Coordinates: 59°23′03″N 17°18′24″E

Mälsåker Castle (Mälsåkers slott) is a manor house in Strängnäs Municipality, Södermanland County, Sweden. The estate is situated in the parish of Ytterselö, north of Mariefred and northeast of Stallarholmen. It is situated on Björkfjärden, a bay on Lake Mälaren.

== History ==
The main buildings were built in the 1660s and 1670s by Gustaf Soop (1624-1679), after drawings by Nikodemus Tessin, d. ä. (1615–1681). In 1839, the estate was inherited by Louise von Fersen (1816–1879). In 1853, she gambled away Mälsåker to Fredrik Åkerman (1800-1877). After his death, it changed owners several times. It was sold in 1898 to engineer Åke Sjögren who began a restoration of the estate.

Mälsåker was bought in 1943 by the Norwegian legation in Stockholm and the premises were used in the training of Norwegian police troops during World War II. In 1945, the roof caught fire and the manor burned. In 1951, a new roof was built. In 1993, the Royal Swedish Academy of Letters, History and Antiquities (Vitterhetsakademien) initiated an extensive restoration. Since 2007 an association has been responsible for making the castle available to the public.

== In film ==
The castle appears in the 1969 film The Gladiators where it is the headquarters of a televised war game.
