= Vansö kyrkby =

- Location within Södermanland Location within Sweden
- Coordinates: 59°24′10″N 16°56′30″E
- Country: Sweden
- Province: Södermanland
- County: Södermanland County
- Municipality: Strängnäs Municipality

Area
  - Total: 0.21 km^{2} (0.081 sq mi)

Population (31 December 2010)
  - Total: 202
  - Density: 958/km^{2} (2,480/sq mi)
- Time zone: UTC+1 (CET)
  - Summer (DST): UTC+2 (CEST)

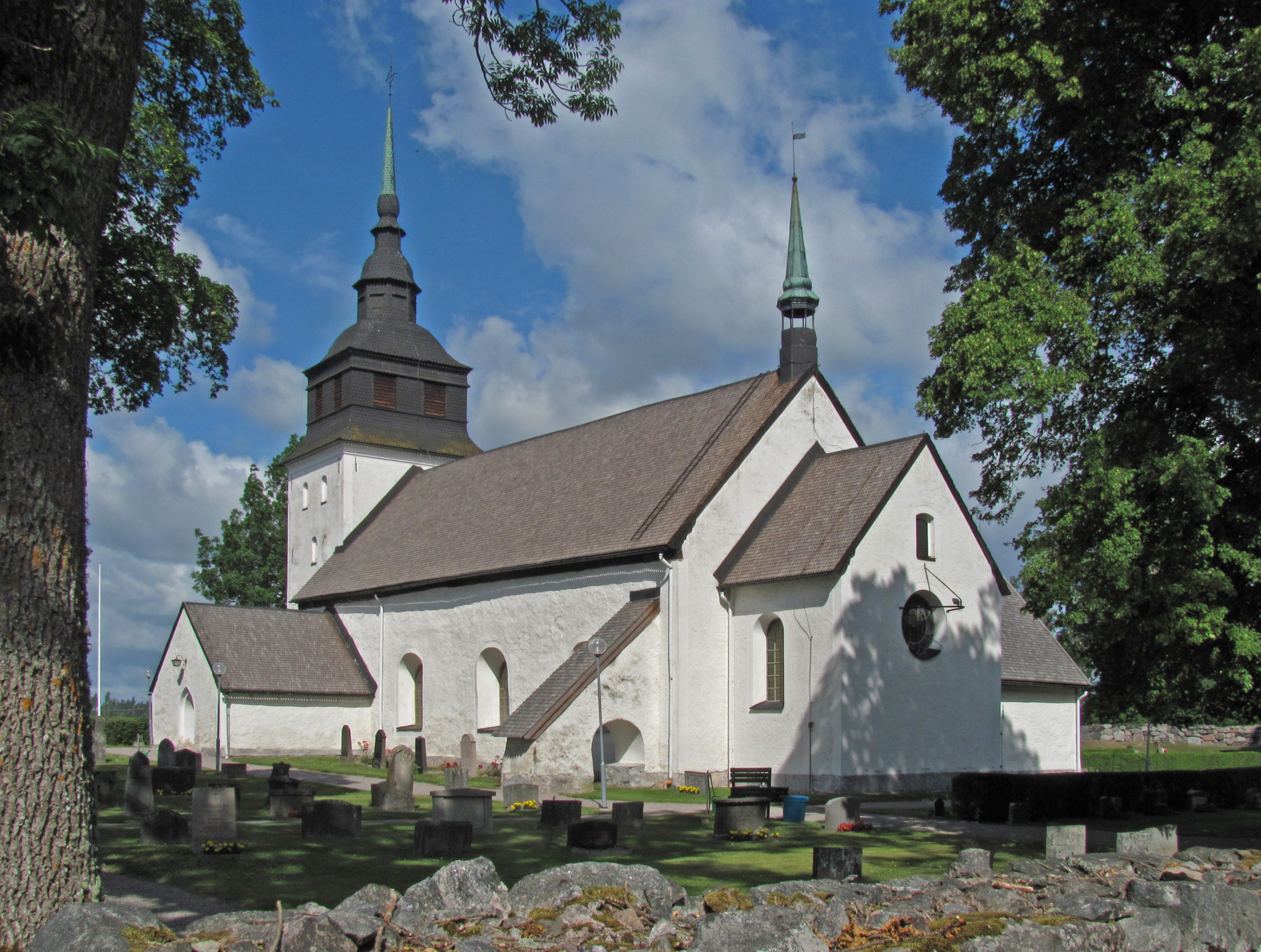
Vansö Church

Vansö kyrkby (or just Vansö [ˈvânːsøː, ˈvɑ̂ːnsøː]) is a locality situated in Strängnäs Municipality, Södermanland County, Sweden with 202 inhabitants in 2010.
