= Södermanland Runic Inscription 174 =

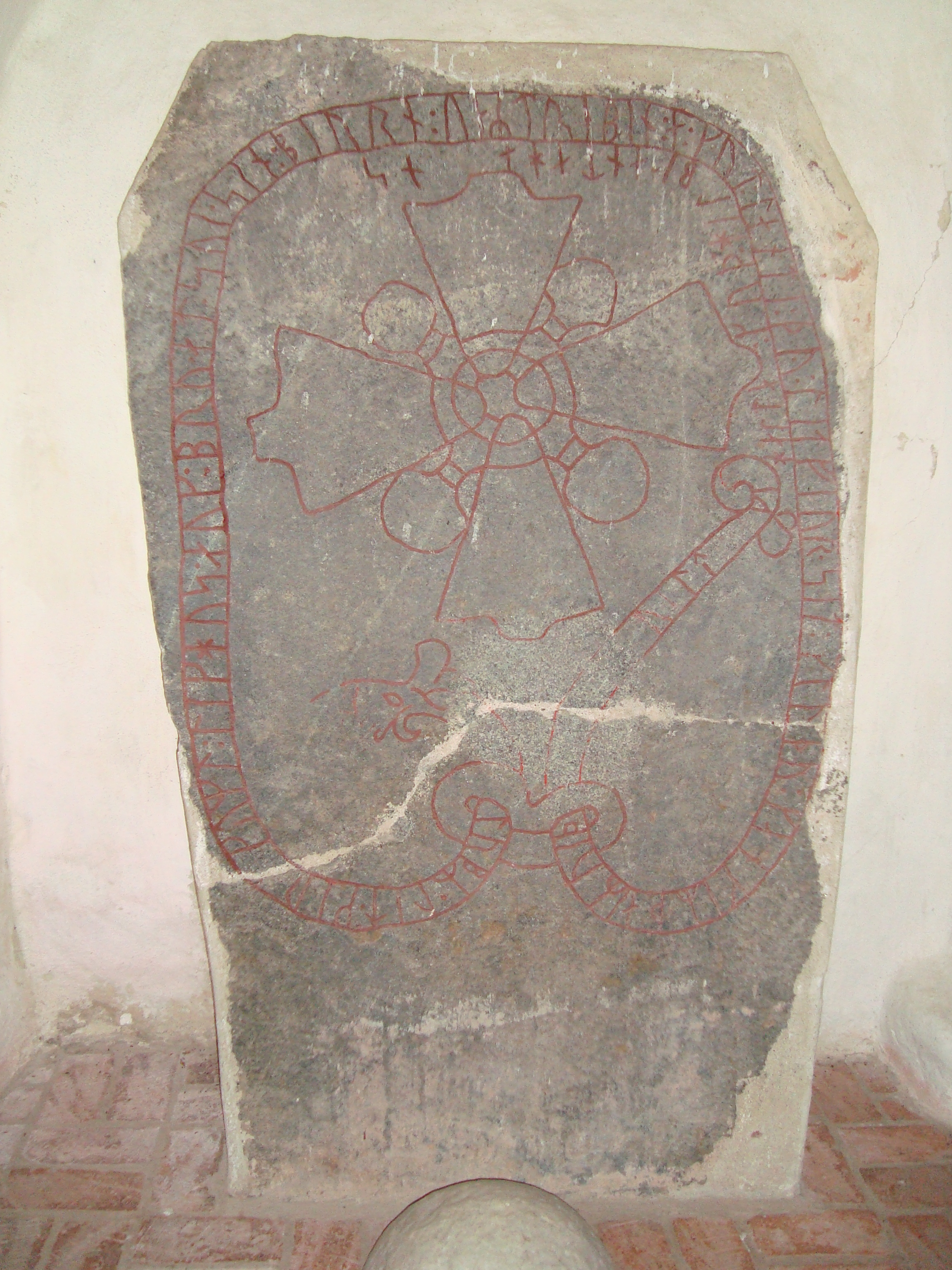
Sö 174

The Södermanland Runic Inscription 174 is a Viking Age runestone engraved in Old Norse with the Younger Futhark runic alphabet. It is located at Aspö Church in Strängnäs Municipality. The style of the runestone is a categorized as Pr1.

== Inscription ==
[ub]lubʀ · lit · kira : kuml : likhus : auk : bru · at sun sin : biurn : uaʀ trebin : a : kut:lanti : þy : lit : fiur · sit : fluþu : kankiʀ : þaiʀ uiþ[ulkuʀ] : uiltu iki halta : guþ : hilbi : anta : hans
Olafʀ(?)/Oblauðr(?)/Upplaupʀ(?) {} let {} gæra {} kumbl, {} likhus/liknhus {} ok {} bro {} at sun sinn {} Biorn, {} vaʀ dræpinn {} a {} Gutlandi. {} Þy {} let {} fior {} sitt, {} flyðu {} gængiʀ, {} þæiʀ ... {} vildu ækki halda. {} Guð {} hialpi {} anda {} hans.
"Ólafr(?)/Óblauðr(?)/Upphlaupr(?) had the monument and sarcophagus/hospice and bridge made in memory of his son Bjôrn, (who) was killed on Gotland. Because his followers fled, he lost his life; they ... would not hold. May God help his spirit."
