= Segersön Nature Reserve =

Nature reserve in Sweden

Coordinates: 59.468°N 16.931°E

- Segersöns naturreservat
- IUCN category IV (habitat/species management area)
- Interactive map of Segersön Nature Reserve
- Location: Strängnäs Municipality
- Established: 2002

Segersön Nature Reserve is a nature reserve in Strängnäs Municipality, Södermanland County, Sweden.

== Description ==
The area has been protected since 2025 and is 179 hectares in size. The reserve includes the island of the same name and a few small islands around in Lake Mälaren and consists of deciduous forests and pastures. It is only accessible only by boat. The reserve features a four-kilometer hiking trail traversing varied landscapes of cattle-grazed pastures, swimming cliffs, and dense broadleaf forests. As an ecological sanctuary, the site supports over 75 red-listed species, including rare beetles in 300-year-old pollarded linden trees.
