= Olav Svendsen =

Norwegian lawyer and judge (1899–1984)

- Born: 25 July 1899; Kristiania, Norway
- Died: 14 July 1984 (aged 84)
- Occupation: Judge

Olav Svendsen (25 July 1899 – 14 July 1984) was a Norwegian lawyer and judge. He was born in Kristiania. He graduated as cand.jur. in 1922, was a barrister in Oslo from 1925 to 1929, and from 1929 assigned with the Oslo police. During the occupation of Norway by Nazi Germany, from 1941 to 1945, he chaired the juridical office (Norwegian: Rettskontoret) at the Norwegian Legation in Stockholm. From 1947 to 1971 he served as stipendiary magistrate in Vinger and Odal District Court.
