= The Gladiators (1969 film) =

- Directed by: Peter Watkins
- Written by: Peter Watkins; Nicholas Gosling
- Produced by: Goran Lindgren
- Cinematography: Peter Suschitzky
- Music by: Claes af Geijerstam
- Release date: 25 June 1969
- Running time: 92 minutes
- Country: Sweden
- Languages: English; Cantonese; French; German; Swedish

The Gladiators (Swedish: Gladiatorerna, alternate title The Peace Game) is a 1969 Swedish drama/science fiction film directed by Peter Watkins. It takes place in a world where the United Nations and the leading Communist countries have introduced "The International Peace Games," in order to secure international peace and security. The Peace Games are deadly miniature battles fought between small teams of drafted soldiers from each country, and broadcast on TV around the world as a popular reality program, with commercials included.

== Plot ==
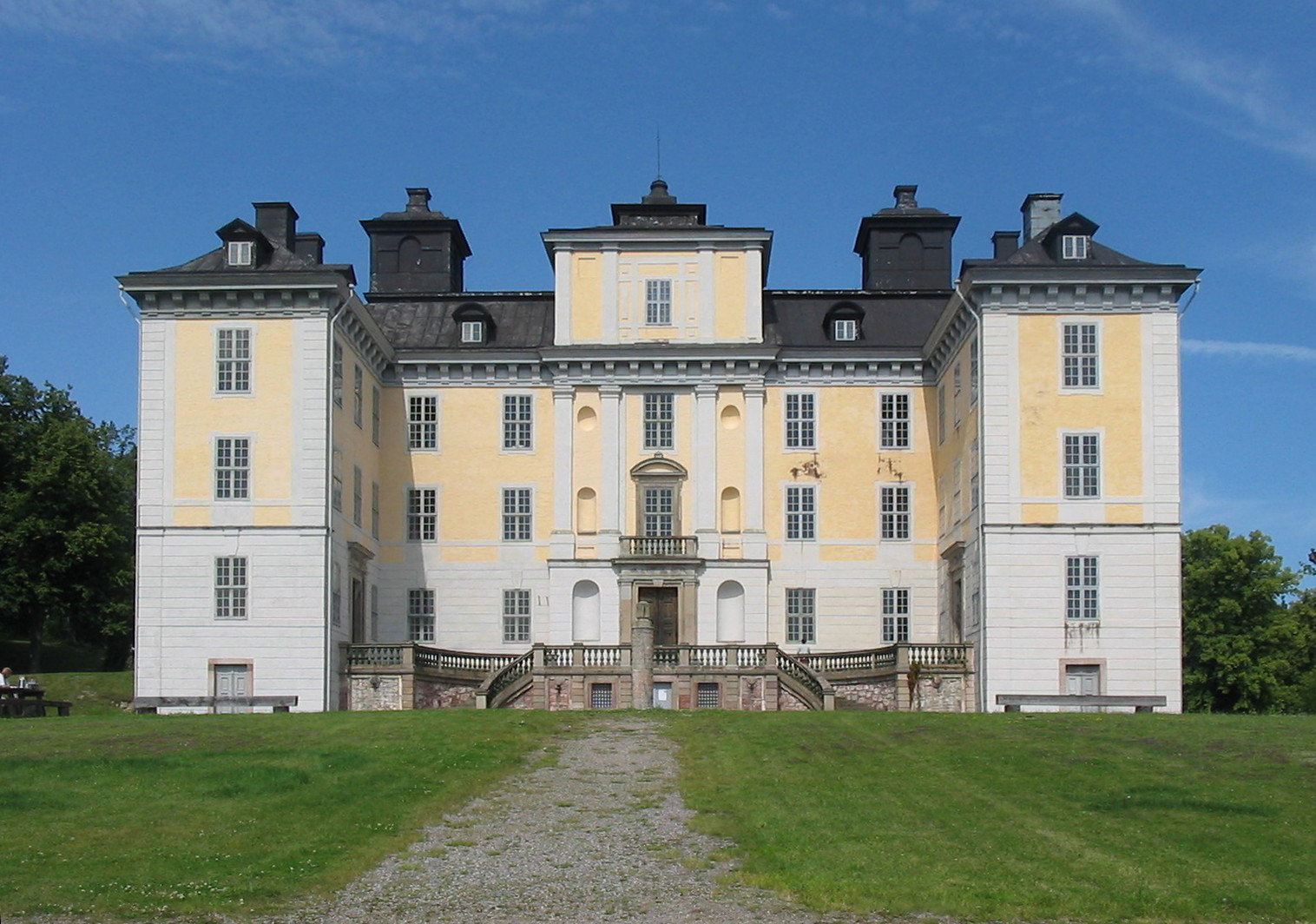
The Mälsåker Castle (image from 2004) was filmed as the headquarters.

The story begins with an interviewer asking contestants from different countries why they are fighting in the games, of which they give different answers. Meanwhile, officers and colonels from different countries arrive at a castle near Stockholm where Peace Game number 256 is to be arranged by the Swedish Army using the ICAROS-system. There is also a French student (B-3) who infiltrates the Games in order to destroy the system from within. Despite his intentions, he is allowed into the battlegrounds.

The Games begin with the Allied Team being given 2 hours to reach the Control Room. They will have the opportunity to gain points along the way, and the Communist Team will try to stop them. As the Allied Team delay their actions, points are deducted, and bombs are set off in order for them to react. The team advance into the building, following red lights. On their way, they are ambushed by machine-gun fire and capture a female Chinese member from the opposite team. They then encounter a group of scantily dressed hippie-ladies and loses one of their members to injuries. For this, the officers and colonels reward the team with points. Meanwhile, B-3 is approached by a Swedish policeman who asks what he wish to do after destroying the system. The student says he wishes to replace it with a new system. The policeman asks him how he intends to do this and instead offers him a position at the Control Room.

While the Communist Team advances, a member of The Allied team starts to communicate with the female prisoner, which the colonels and officers regard as a grave threat to the stability of the world-system, and therefore asks that the Games be declared an honorable tie. The ICARUS-system is put on autopilot, and policemen are dispatched to dispose of the traitors, but the system also goes haywire. At the end, B-3 reach the Control Room where he tells the operator that he wishes to replace the current system with a system that does not exploit people. The operator tells him that the system exploits everybody, including B-3. Because the student had turned the system on again when he needed it to show him the way to the Control Room, he had doomed the traitors who were the real danger to the system. The operator claims that all systems are basically the same.

== Production ==
After facing professional isolation and critical attacks on his work, Watkins had become inclined to leave the UK, and after being given creative licence by the cinema distributor Sandrews in Stockholm to produce a new film, he began a permanent exile from his home country. He was to be joined by the young writer Nicholas Gosling for his second feature film, and the production was directly influenced by an upsurge in revolutionary events throughout Europe in 1968. Filming occurred during the summer and autumn of 1968 in a deserted brick factory in the countryside at Kårsta, and in an empty minor castle at Mälsåker. The cast was a mix of professional and non-professional actors. Watkins originally had plans to use a fluid, mobile camera-style, but reverted to a formal static style after finding himself restricted by heavy and non-portable 35mm camera equipment.

== Reaction ==
The critical reactions in Sweden were mostly dismissive of the film, with words like "vague" and "boring" being repeated, despite underscoring that Watkins was a talented director. Aside from a few screenings on Swedish TV, the film has not been shown in Swedish cinemas again and disappeared after being screened at a few festivals. British critics were more positive of the film, but did echo much of the same criticism. Judith Crist in New York Magazine called The Gladiators "the finest Peter Watkins film to date" and "one of the finest anti-war films of recent years".

== Cast ==
- Arthur Pentelow as British General
- Frederick Danner as British Staff Officer
- Hans Bendrik as Capt. Davidsson
- Daniel Harle as French Officer
- Hans Berger as West German Officer
- Rosario Gianetti as American Officer
- Tim Yum as Chinese Staff Officer
- Kenneth Lo as Chinese Colonel
- Bjorn Franzen as Swedish Colonel
- Christer Gynge as Assistant Controller
- Jurgen Schilling as East German Officer
- Stefan Dillan as Russian Officer
- Ugo Chiari as Italian Officer
- Chandrakant Desai as Indian Officer
- George Harris as Nigerian Officer
- Pik-Sen Lim as C-2
