= Kjesäter =

Manor in Vingåker Municipality, Sweden

Coordinates: 59.045146°N 15.914469°E

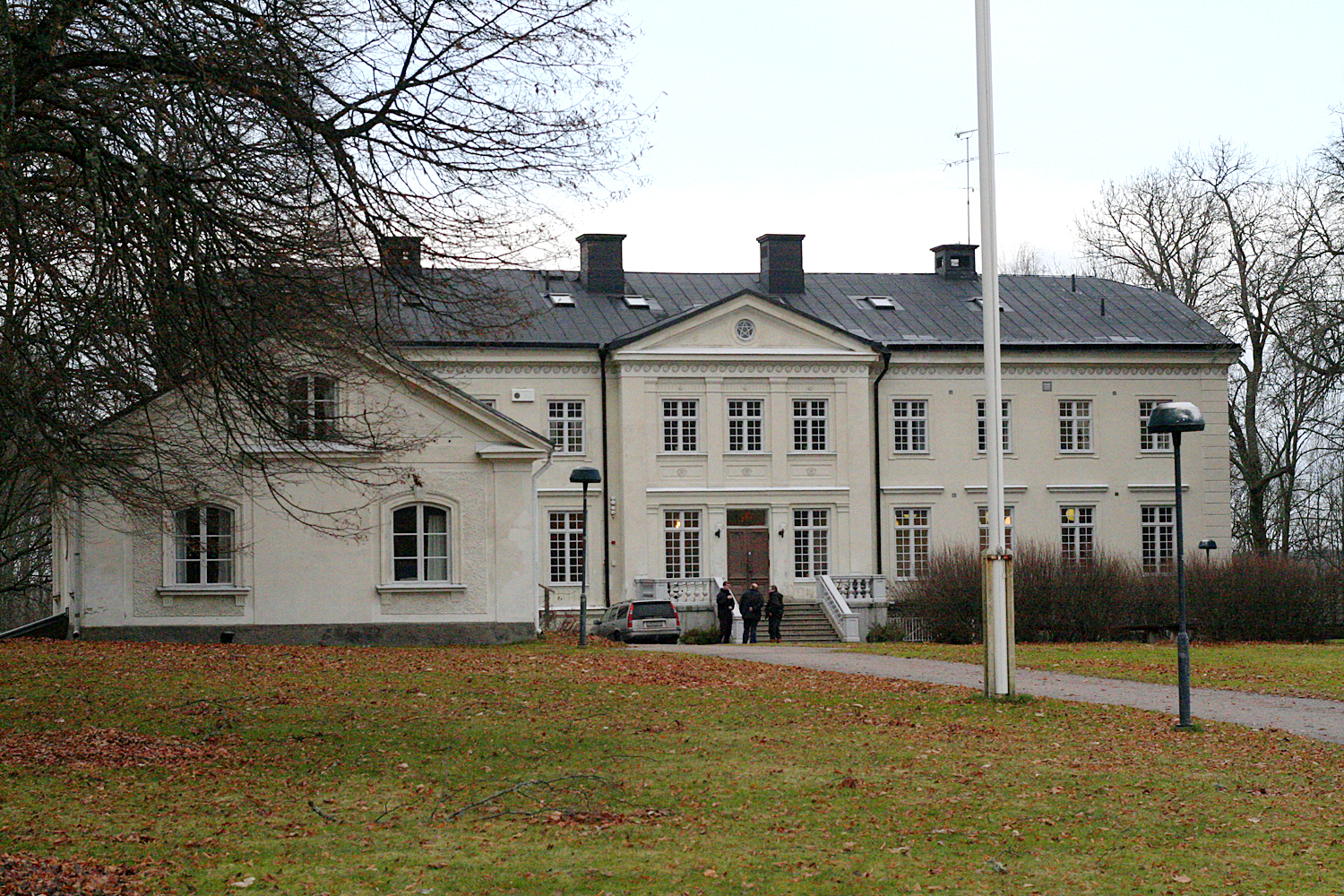
Kjesäter Manor in 2008

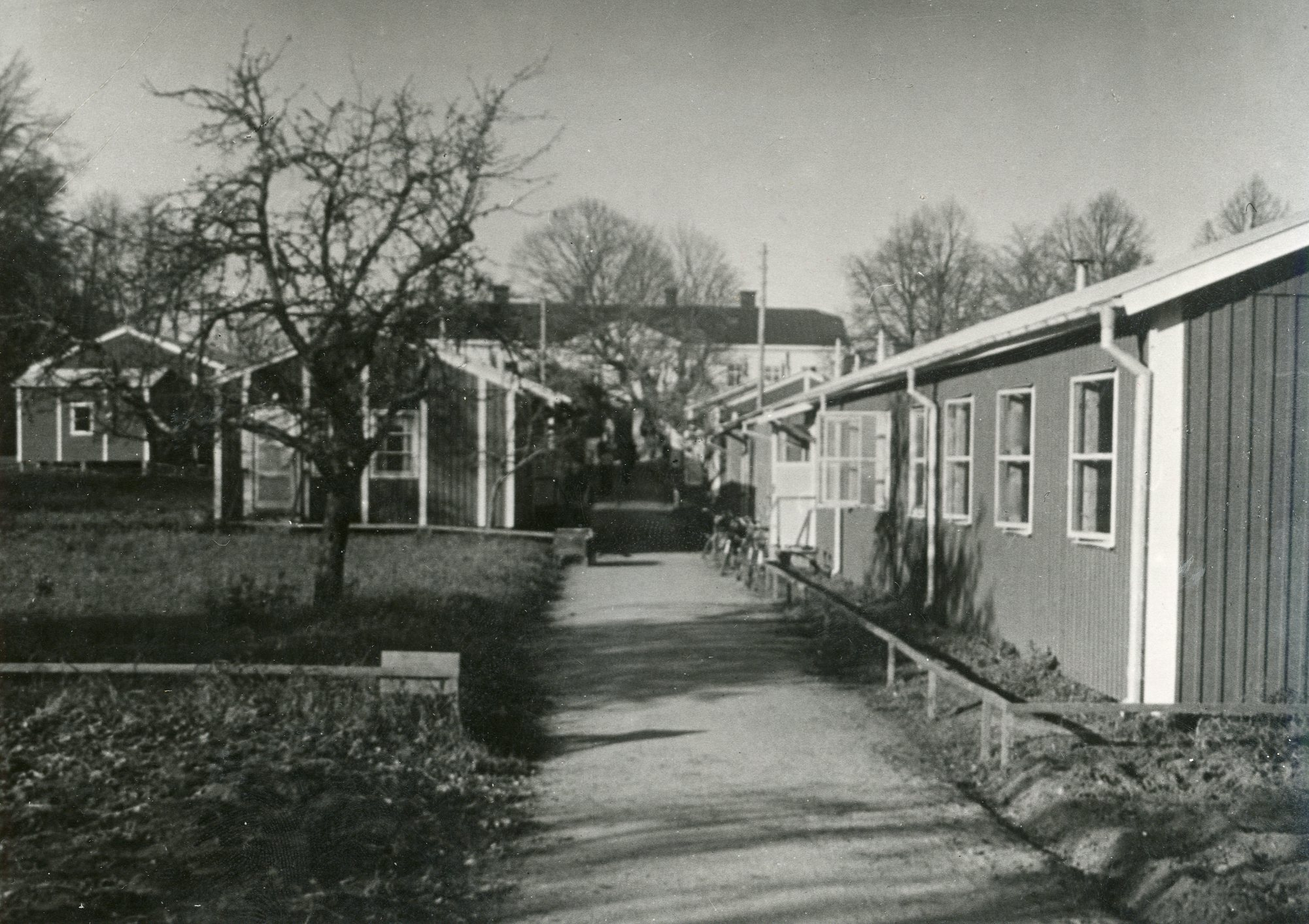
Refugee camp during World War II

Kjesäter is a manor in Vingåker Municipality, Södermanland County, Sweden. The manor and its outbuildings were constructed in 1865 based on designs by the architect Johan Fredrik Åbom for Gustaf Trolle Bonde. The castle’s two wings date from the eighteenth century. During World War II, it operated as a refugee camp and transit center for refugees fleeing Nazi persecution in Norway. From 1960 until 2011 served as a folk high school. Kjesäter has been privately owned since 1981, and the owners run agricultural and forestry operations, property management, conference activities, energy production and hunting.

== Refugee camp and transit center ==
The first wave of refugees to Sweden came from Norway on or after April 9, 1940. These included officials of the legitimate Norwegian government, political activists, especially communists, and some Jews who feared persecution. Many of these initial refugees returned to Norway when things appeared to stabilize. The Swedish government continued to grant asylum to political refugees throughout the war, and in 1942 groups persecuted for other reasons were also admitted by Swedish officials. The escape from Norway usually involved transport by train or side roads to areas near the border, and then clandestine passage on foot, skis and occasionally boat to the Swedish border. Swedish border officials (landsfiskaler) accepted the refugees and sent them to transit centers.

After Öreryd in Småland proved inadequate, on June 15, 1942, Kjesäter was designated as the main assembly and transit point for refugees who had fled the Nazi German occupation of Norway by crossing the border into Sweden. These refugees included political activists, members of the resistance, and Jews fleeing deportation to extermination camps. It is estimated that about 50,000 individuals made it across the border to Sweden during the war. Refugees would typically be intercepted by Swedish border patrols soon after they had entered into Swedish territory, interviewed, and be given an "emergency visa" with 2-week duration with directions and fare (if needed) to Kjesäter. The processing there would take 3–4 days and typically involved medical examination, in-depth interrogations, etc. Norwegian nationals would be given a Norwegian passport; stateless individuals would be given a Swedish identification card. The refugees would also be given fare for their next destination, food, and clothing. At its peak, the center had 30 barracks and a capacity of 700-800 refugees. As Norwegian authorities in exile set up offices in Stockholm, the center served as an important adjunct facility for registering Norwegians in the paramilitary police force and sending younger refugees to the Norwegian high school that had been established in Uppsala.

The center in Kjesäter would serve as the main transit point for refugees from Norway throughout the war. It was directed by John Aae, later mayor of Trondheim, from 1943 to 1945. In June 1943, an additional center was established in Jokkmokk in Norrbotten County for Sami refugees as well. These centers and other facilities became part of the extensive expatriate Norwegian organization that was part of the Norwegian refugee office in Stockholm.
