= Furudal =

- Location within Dalarna Location within Sweden
- Coordinates: 61°10′N 15°08′E
- Country: Sweden
- Province: Dalarna
- County: Dalarna County
- Municipality: Rättvik Municipality

Area
  - Total: 1.10 km^{2} (0.42 sq mi)

Population (31 December 2010)
  - Total: 407
  - Density: 369/km^{2} (960/sq mi)
- Time zone: UTC+1 (CET)
  - Summer (DST): UTC+2 (CEST)

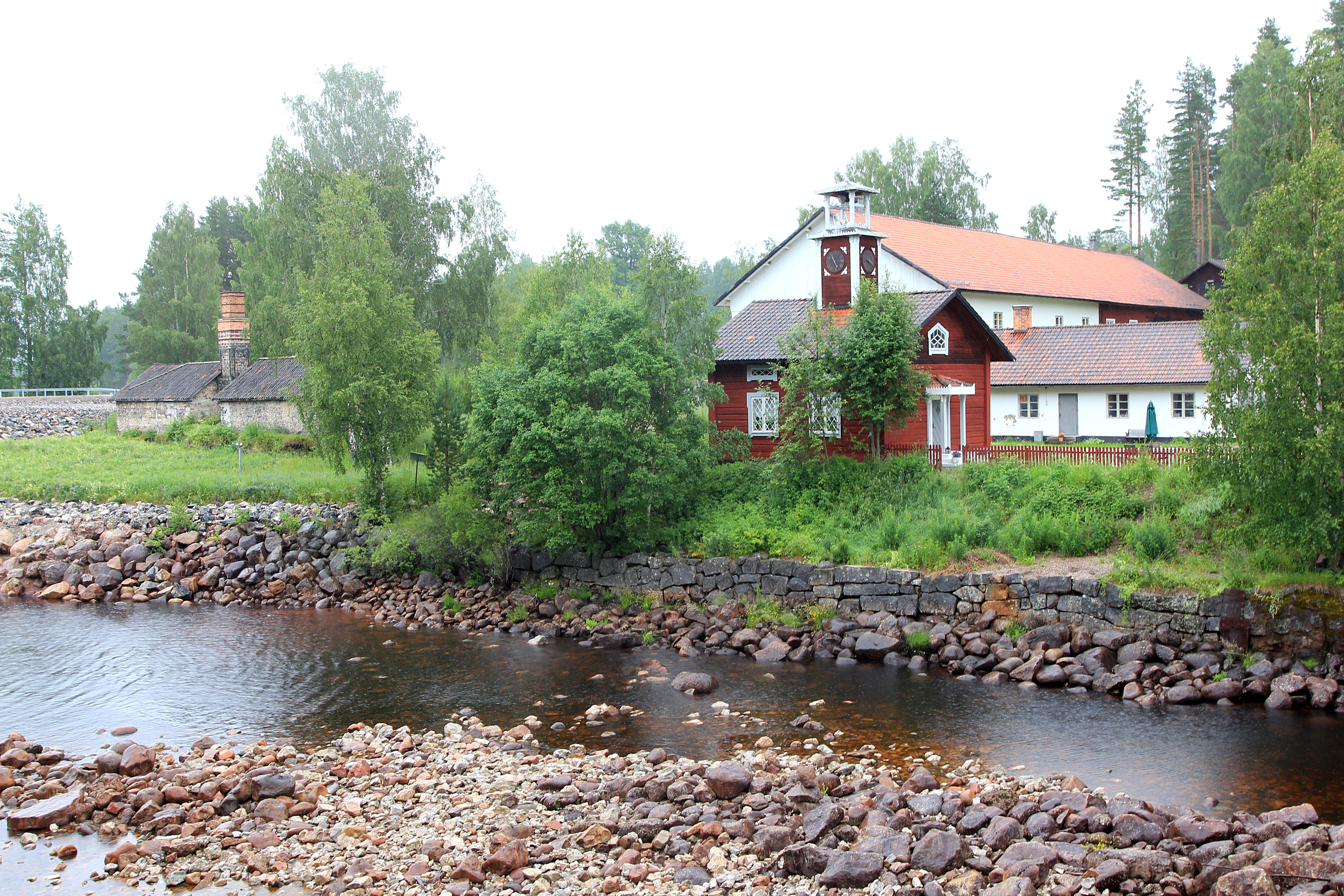
Mill located on the Ore River in Furudal

Furudal is a small locality located in Rättvik Municipality, Dalarna County, Sweden. According to the 2010 census, it had a population of 407 inhabitants.
