= Norwegian legation in Stockholm =

Coordinates: 59.3338°N 18.1073°E

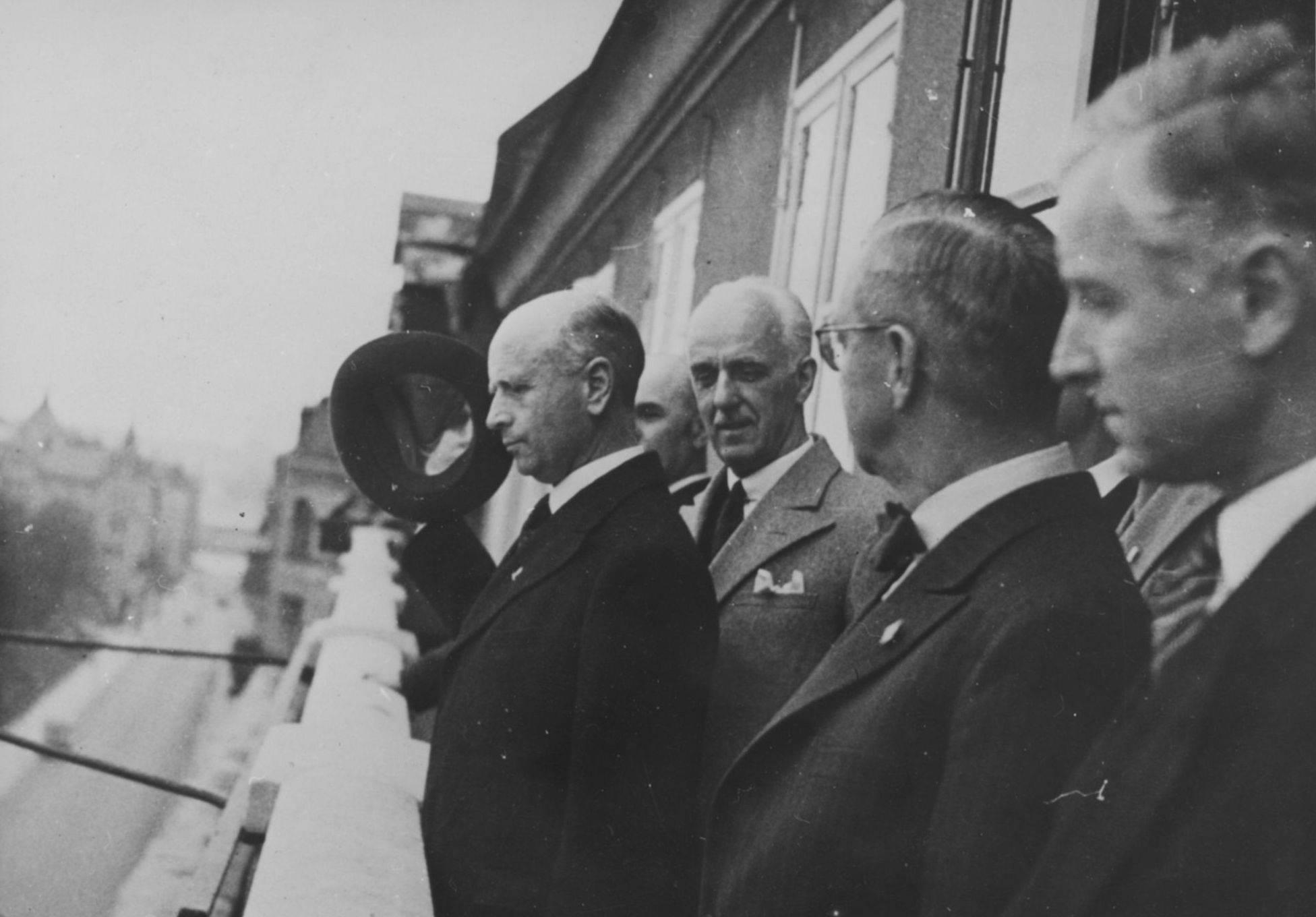
Minister Jens Bull receives Swedish greetings at the legation on 17 May 1942.

The Norwegian Legation in Stockholm played a significant role during the Second World War. Until 9 April 1940 the legation consisted of four persons, and at the end of the war about 1,100 persons were connected to the legation. Refugee cases were among the legation's most central tasks. In 1941 a military office was established, and this was later split into separate offices for intelligence (XU related cases), and for Milorg related cases.

== Management ==
The legation was led by minister Johan Wollebæk from 1921 until his death in October 1940. In 1940 Jens Bull took over as chargé d'affaires, and recognized as minister by the Swedish authorities from 1942. Government representatives in Stockholm during parts of the Second World War were Anders Frihagen and Johan Ludwig Mowinckel.

Important monetary loans to the Norwegian home front were handled by contact between Frihagen and Mowinckel in Stockholm, and people like Tor Skjønsberg and Øystein Thommessen in Norway.

== Refugee Office ==
During the Second World War, about 50,000 Norwegian refugees found their way to Sweden. The refugees were received at Öreryd and later Kjesäter, and a number of camps were established. Many of the refugees were educated as police troops. Annæus Schjødt led the refugee office from 1942 to 1943.

From 1942 Harald Gram was leading the so-called Idrettskontoret, which organised courier traffic between Norway and Sweden. Idrettskontoret was a blind for agent practice, among others for 2A agents. Annæus Schjødt's wife Hedevig Schjødt, a 2A agent like her husband, was active in Idrettskontoret as well. However Idrettskontoret also organised courses in physical education, as an equivalent to the National Gymnastic School (now: the Norwegian School of Sport Sciences) which still operated in occupied Norway. The leader of the course was Sigurd Dahle, acting director of the National Gymnastic School from 1945 to 1947.

== Military Office ==
Ragnvald Alfred Roscher Lund was a military attaché at the Legation from June to October 1940. The Military Office was established in 1941. This office was later, in 1943, split into the sections Mi II and Mi IV, numbers corresponding to sections in the Norwegian High Command in London, FO II (intelligence cases, with Roscher Lund as Head) and FO IV (Milorg cases). Starting in 1943 Mi II was headed by Major Ørnulf Dahl, who also was responsible for the Legation's contacts with the clandestine organisation XU. Part of the XU organisation was led from Stockholm, while part was led from Oslo and communicated directly with the Norwegian High Command in London.

== Publications ==
The Press Office, led by press attaché Jens Schive, issued the newspaper Norges-Nytt from 1941. Norges-Nytt had a circulation of up to 40,000 copies. The Legation funded the underground newspaper Håndslag, edited by Eyvind Johnson, Torolf Elster and Willy Brandt, and distributed illegally in Norway.
