= Öreryd =

- Village and parish
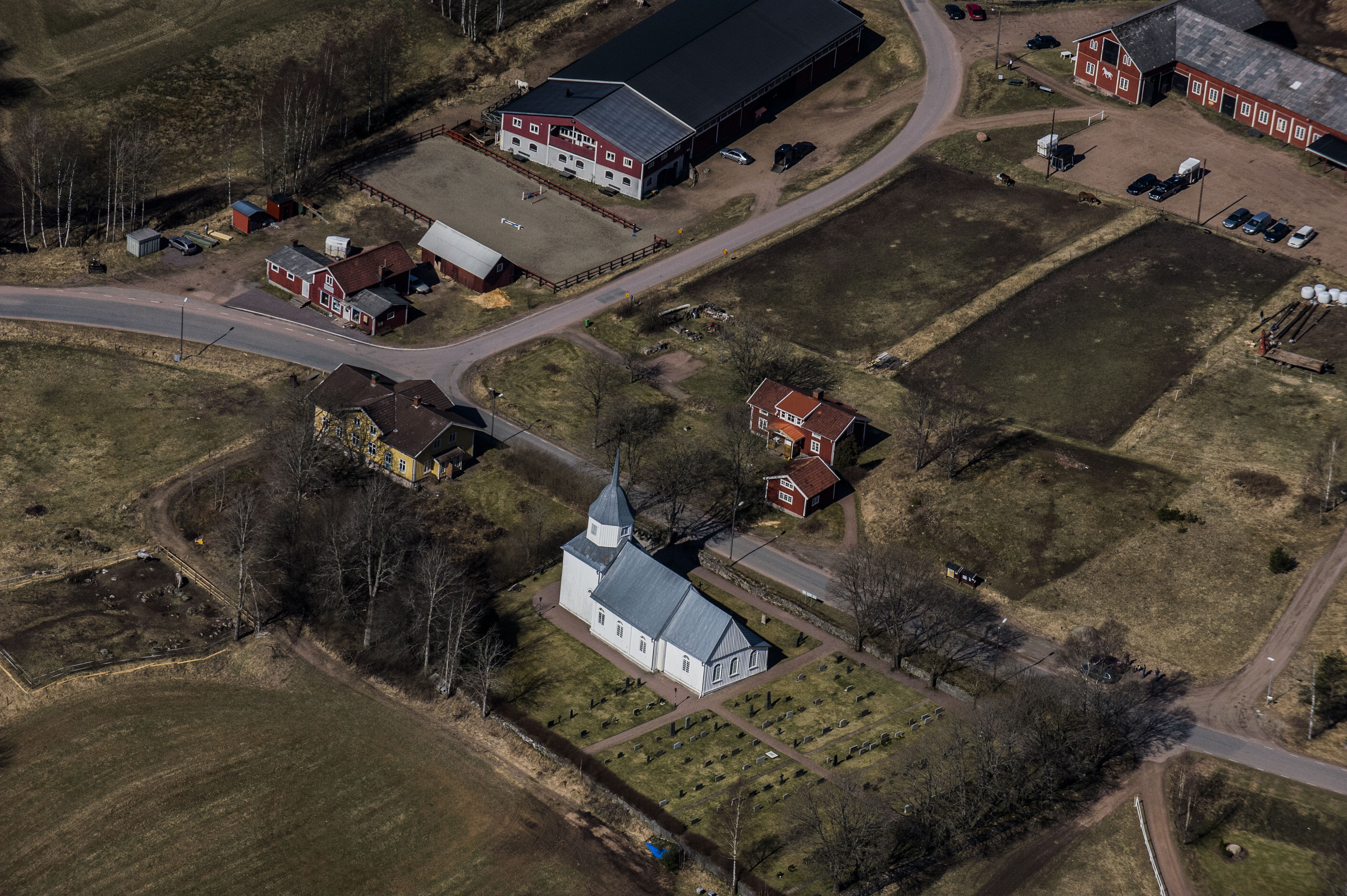
- Öreryd Church

- Location within Jönköping Location within Sweden
- Coordinates: 57°30′N 13°40′E
- Country: Sweden
- Province: Småland
- County: Jönköping
- Municipality: Gislaved Municipality

Öreryd (Swedish pronunciation: [ˈœ̂rːɛˌryːd]) is a village and parish in Småland, Sweden, in the county of Jönköping. During World War II, Öreryd hosted a refugee camp and transit center for refugees fleeing Nazi persecution in occupied Norway, from March 1941 until June 1942, when it was replaced by the camp Kjesäter. From 1944 Öreryd was one of the approved training sites for the Norwegian police troops in Sweden.
