= Stallarholmen =

- Flag Coat of arms

- Location within Södermanland Location within Sweden
- Coordinates: 59°22′N 17°12′E
- Country: Sweden
- Province: Södermanland
- County: Södermanland County
- Municipality: Strängnäs Municipality

Area
  - Total: 1.95 km^{2} (0.75 sq mi)

Population (31 December 2020)
  - Total: 1,864
  - Density: 956/km^{2} (2,480/sq mi)
- Time zone: UTC+1 (CET)
  - Summer (DST): UTC+2 (CEST)

Stallarholmen is a locality situated in Strängnäs Municipality, Södermanland County, Sweden, with 1,623 inhabitants in 2010.

Stallarholmen, located on Lake Mälaren, is situated partly on the mainland and partly on the island of Selaön, Sweden's largest freshwater island. The island and the mainland are connected via a bridge built in the mid 20th century.

The etymology of the name Stallarholmen may be related to stables ("stall") and small islands ("holme"). An article in Strengnäs Tidning from 1927 says the word "holme" refers to the isthmus that juts out from the mainland. Another suggested etymology relates to King Charles XI of Sweden, who stabled his horses and exchanged carriages in Stallarholmen during his regular trips to Kungsör. Although it was out of the way in summer, winter travel over ice made this a convenient stop. However, Charles XI was king in the late 17th century, while there is reference to the name Stallarholmen in the letters of Gustav Vasa from the 1540s and 1550s, making this etymology somewhat dubious.

The land around Stallarholmen, both on the mainland and on Selaön, consists largely of clay. Brickworks were a primary industry in the area until the late 1970s. Selaön was home to several brickworks, including Nasby, Fiskarudden, Valla and Husby. On the mainland were several more, including Sundby and Räfsnäs. All but Husby Brickyard, the largest and last to close, are now demolished. The former Husby premises now house several small businesses and a marina.

Stallarholmen’s surrounding area contains 25 runestones, most of them on Selaön. This is the highest concentration in Södermanland.

A major recurring event in Stallarholmen is the Viking Festival. This festival, which features Viking-style entertainers, craftsmen, dramatic performances, and games, attracts thousands of visitors each year. Since 2003, it has taken place on Selaön during the first weekend of July. In 2006 a newly carved runestone was erected at the site with the inscription: "Stallarholmen's Vikings raised this stone as a link between the past and the future."
