= Strängnäs Municipality =

Strängnäs Municipality Strängnäs kommun
- Municipality
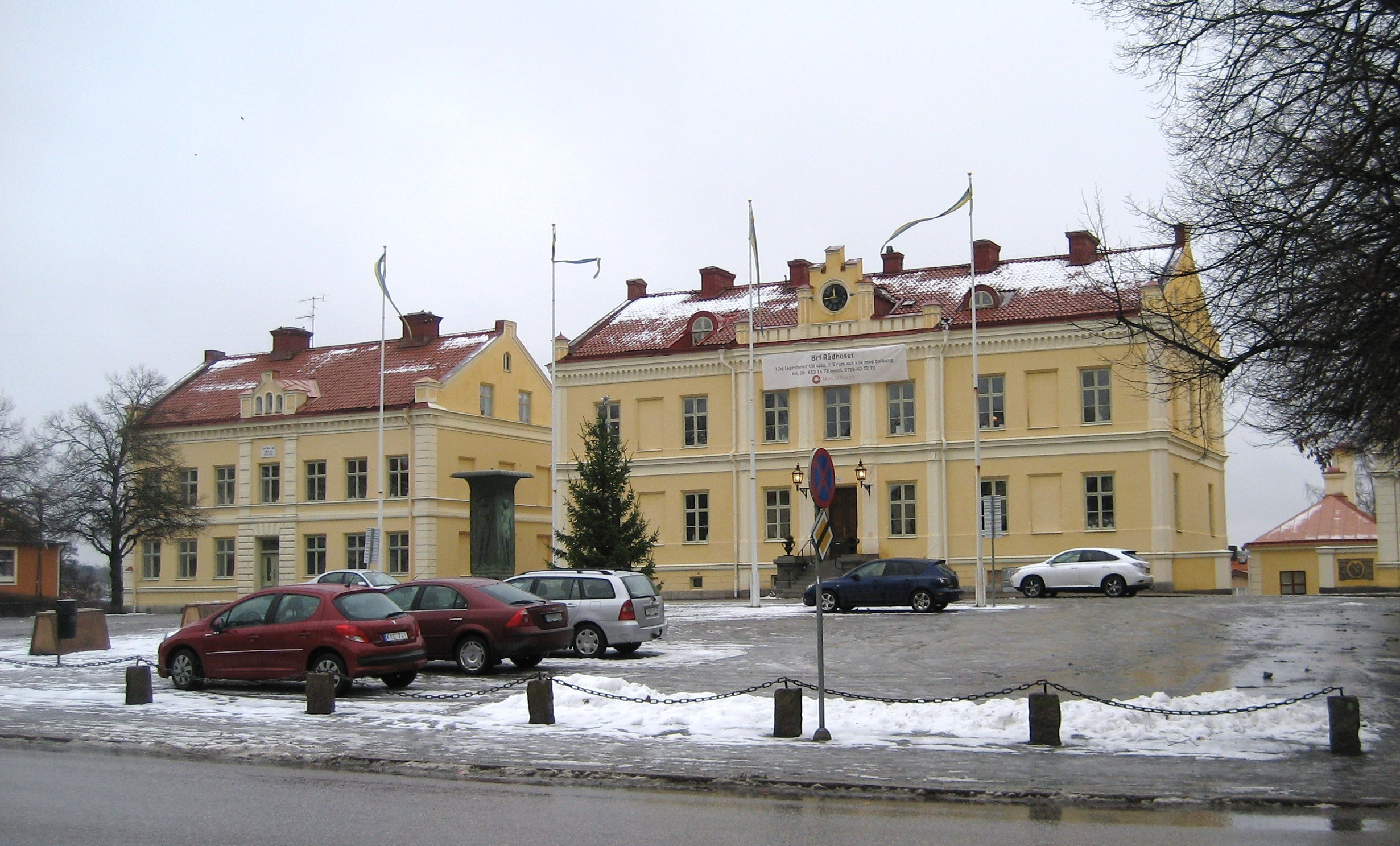
- Former Strängnäs town hall, in use until 1994.

- Flag Coat of arms

- Coordinates: 59°22′N 17°02′E
- Country: Sweden
- County: Södermanland County
- Seat: Strängnäs

Area
  - Total: 975.08 km^{2} (376.48 sq mi)
  - Land: 739.7 km^{2} (285.6 sq mi)
  - Water: 235.38 km^{2} (90.88 sq mi)
- Area as of 1 January 2014.

Population (30 June 2025)
  - Total: 39,395
  - Density: 53.26/km^{2} (137.9/sq mi)
- Time zone: UTC+1 (CET)
  - Summer (DST): UTC+2 (CEST)
- ISO 3166 code: SE
- Province: Södermanland
- Municipal code: 0486
- Website: www.strangnas.se

Strängnäs Municipality (Swedish: Strängnäs kommun) is a municipality in Södermanland County in eastern Sweden, located by Lake Mälaren. Its seat is located in the city of Strängnäs.

The present municipality was created in 1971, when the City of Strängnäs was amalgamated with the City of Mariefred and a number of rural municipalities. Originally there were 15 local government entities in the area.

The boxer Erik Agren was born here

== Localities ==
The municipality consists of the old towns of Strängnäs and Mariefred and the villages of Åkers styckebruk and Stallarholmen.

- Strängnäs (seat)
- Mariefred
- Åkers styckebruk
- Stallarholmen

== History ==
Strängnäs is an old town with a history dating to the Viking Age. Its location on the shores of Lake Mälaren has made Strängnäs an important trading centre and meeting place through the ages.

Mariefred acquired its name from the monastery Pax Mariae ("Mary's Peace") which was founded some 500 years ago by Sten Sture the Elder. There are no remains above ground of the monastery, which was the location where Mariefred's church, built in 1624, now stands.

== Economy ==
Strängnäs has a multifaceted and dynamic economy, being home to businesses of different sizes and in many different sectors. The prominent industries are biotech, pharmaceuticals, logistics, education, engineering and tourism.

== Demographics ==
This is a demographic table based on Strängnäs Municipality's electoral districts in the 2022 Swedish general election sourced from SVT's election platform, in turn taken from SCB official statistics.

In total there were 38,341 inhabitants, of whom 28,212 were Swedish citizens of voting age. 42.0% voted for the left coalition and 56.7% for the right coalition. Indicators are in percentage points except population totals and income.

Location	Residents	Citizen adults	Left vote	Right vote	Employed	Swedish parents	Foreign heritage	Income SEK	Degree
Location			%	%					
Abborrberget-Sundby	1,630	1,205	43.2	55.5	74	74	26	26,102	42
Dammen-Malmby-Löt	1,824	1,252	39.5	58.5	79	73	27	26,488	33
Eldsund-Tingstuhöjden	1,505	1,109	44.8	52.7	66	55	45	21,721	34
Finninge	2,210	1,587	48.6	50.5	84	80	20	29,095	44
Härad	989	747	40.1	58.2	81	87	13	28,289	34
Kyrkberget-Kvarnbacken	1,789	1,468	39.1	60.0	80	82	18	26,704	42
Länna	800	565	30.9	68.1	81	81	19	26,664	31
Mariefred C	1,553	1,274	48.2	51.1	83	88	12	28,550	55
Marielund-Hedlandet	1,848	1,273	41.8	57.6	90	84	16	35,548	60
Norra Tosterö-Aspö	1,578	1,160	38.9	60.7	82	85	15	28,724	42
Slottsbrinken-Viggeby	1,633	1,207	40.6	57.8	86	88	12	32,010	50
Stadsskogen	1,675	1,115	50.6	47.7	66	57	43	22,200	37
Stavlund-Södra Tosterö	1,265	848	37.9	60.7	80	76	24	28,673	47
Storgärdet-Sidöparken	1,476	1,206	45.3	53.4	78	79	21	26,423	48
Strängnäs C	1,429	1,169	43.6	54.3	78	80	20	22,850	33
Tallåsen-Sörgärdet	1,577	1,278	43.2	55.8	80	84	16	24,865	44
Toresund	2,131	1,630	37.9	61.1	85	85	15	29,078	40
Ulvhäll-Långberget	2,198	1,536	44.4	53.6	81	74	26	25,937	38
Vårfruberga	1,481	1,137	38.7	60.2	83	88	12	27,190	37
Ytterselö-Överselö	1,790	1,405	43.1	55.6	81	85	15	24,919	35
Åker N	2,135	1,492	39.9	58.9	83	75	25	27,852	28
Åker S	1,771	1,260	38.5	60.2	81	73	27	25,685	26
Öster-Ekhov-Kalkudden	1,784	1,289	41.3	57.4	79	82	18	26,887	37
Source: SVT

== Elections ==
=== Riksdag ===
These are the results of the Riksdag elections of Strängnäs Municipality since the 1972 municipality reform. The results of the Sweden Democrats were not published by SCB between 1988 and 1998 at a municipal level to the party's small nationwide size at the time.

Year	Turnout	Votes	V	S	MP	C	L	KD	M	SD	ND
1973	92.5	13,741	3.1	43.0	0.0	24.6	11.9	1.5	15.5	0.0	0.0
1976	93.1	14,931	2.7	41.4	0.0	24.1	13.6	0.9	16.8	0.0	0.0
1979	92.0	15,400	3.8	41.9	0.0	17.9	12.9	1.0	21.7	0.0	0.0
1982	92.5	16,146	4.1	44.3	1.8	14.5	7.4	1.5	26.3	0.0	0.0
1985	91.2	16,528	3.7	44.0	1.6	10.3	17.8	0.0	23.4	0.0	0.0
1988	86.7	16,263	4.4	40.9	5.2	9.9	16.6	1.9	20.8	0.0	0.0
1991	87.5	17,207	2.9	34.9	3.1	7.2	11.9	6.2	25.2	0.0	8.2
1994	87.1	17,808	4.8	43.2	4.8	6.6	9.1	3.4	26.1	0.0	1.1
1998	81.4	16,902	9.2	35.5	4.2	4.2	5.6	12.2	27.7	0.0	0.0
2002	80.0	17,534	5.9	38.4	4.4	5.4	16.2	9.4	18.3	0.5	0.0
2006	83.1	18,922	3.7	32.5	4.7	7.6	8.3	6.7	32.4	2.2	0.0
2010	85.5	20,626	4.2	26.8	6.7	6.7	7.7	5.4	35.2	6.4	0.0
2014	87.2	21,889	4.6	27.5	5.9	5.5	5.4	4.9	28.8	14.7	0.0

Blocs

This lists the relative strength of the socialist and centre-right blocs since 1973, but parties not elected to the Riksdag are inserted as "other", including the Sweden Democrats results from 1988 to 2006, but also the Christian Democrats pre-1991 and the Greens in 1982, 1985 and 1991. The sources are identical to the table above. The coalition or government mandate marked in bold formed the government after the election. New Democracy got elected in 1991 but are still listed as "other" due to the short lifespan of the party. "Elected" is the total number of percentage points from the municipality that went to parties who were elected to the Riksdag.

Year	Turnout	Votes	Left	Right	SD	Other	Elected
1973	92.5	13,741	**46.1**	52.0	0.0	1.9	98.1
1976	93.1	14,931	44.1	**54.5**	0.0	1.4	98.6
1979	92.0	15,400	45.7	**52.5**	0.0	1.8	98.2
1982	92.5	16,146	**48.4**	48.2	0.0	3.4	96.6
1985	91.2	16,528	**47.7**	51.5	0.0	1.8	98.2
1988	86.7	16,263	**50.5**	47.3	0.0	2.2	97.8
1991	87.5	17,207	37.8	**50.5**	0.0	11.7	96.5
1994	87.1	17,808	**52.8**	45.2	0.0	2.0	98.0
1998	81.4	16,902	**48.9**	49.7	0.0	1.4	98.6
2002	80.0	17,534	**48.7**	49.3	0.0	2.0	98.0
2006	83.1	18,922	40.9	**55.0**	0.0	4.1	95.9
2010	85.5	20,626	37.7	**55.0**	6.4	0.9	99.1
2014	87.2	21,889	**38.0**	44.6	14.7	2.7	97.3

== Twin towns – sister cities ==
Strängnäs is twinned with:

- Kandava, Latvia
- Kisko (Salo), Finland
- Simanjiro District (Emboreet), Tanzania
- Muurla (Salo), Finland
- Olsztynek, Poland
- Priozersk, Russia
- Ratzeburg, Germany
- Rheinsberg, Germany
- Ribe, Denmark
- Saku, Estonia
- Sauvo, Finland
- Sogndal, Norway
