= Gylle Church =

- Gylle kyrka
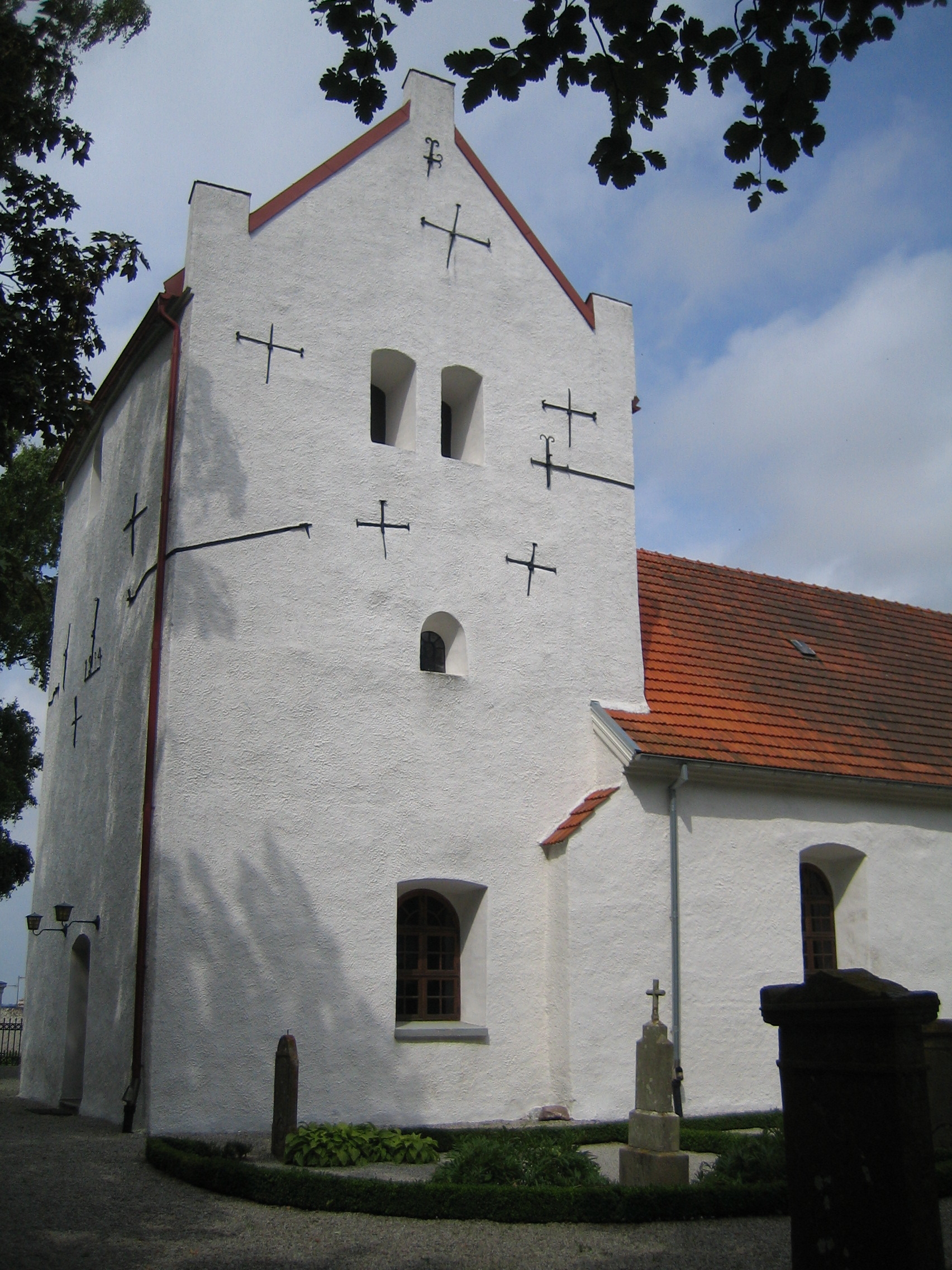
- Gylle Church

- Location within Skåne Location within Sweden
- 55°24′31″N 13°11′50″E
- Country: Sweden
- Denomination: Church of Sweden

Gylle Church (Swedish: Gylle kyrka) is a medieval Lutheran church on the countryside north-east of Trelleborg, Sweden. It belongs to the Diocese of Lund.

== History and architecture ==
Gylle Church was probably erected at the end of the 12th century, but has been subsequently changed and reconstructed on numerous occasions. The church tower dates from the late Middle Ages, probably the 15th or 16th century. In 1875, the church was substantially enlarged and altered. A large crucifix from the second half of the 15th century is preserved in the church, while the altarpiece is from 1580, in Renaissance style. The altarpiece has been re-painted several times, but during a renovation in 1936, the original paintings were restored. The pulpit is also from the 16th century.
