= Fredrik Modéus =

Swedish theologian and bishop (born 1964)

The Right Reverend Fredrik Modéus
- Bishop of Växjö
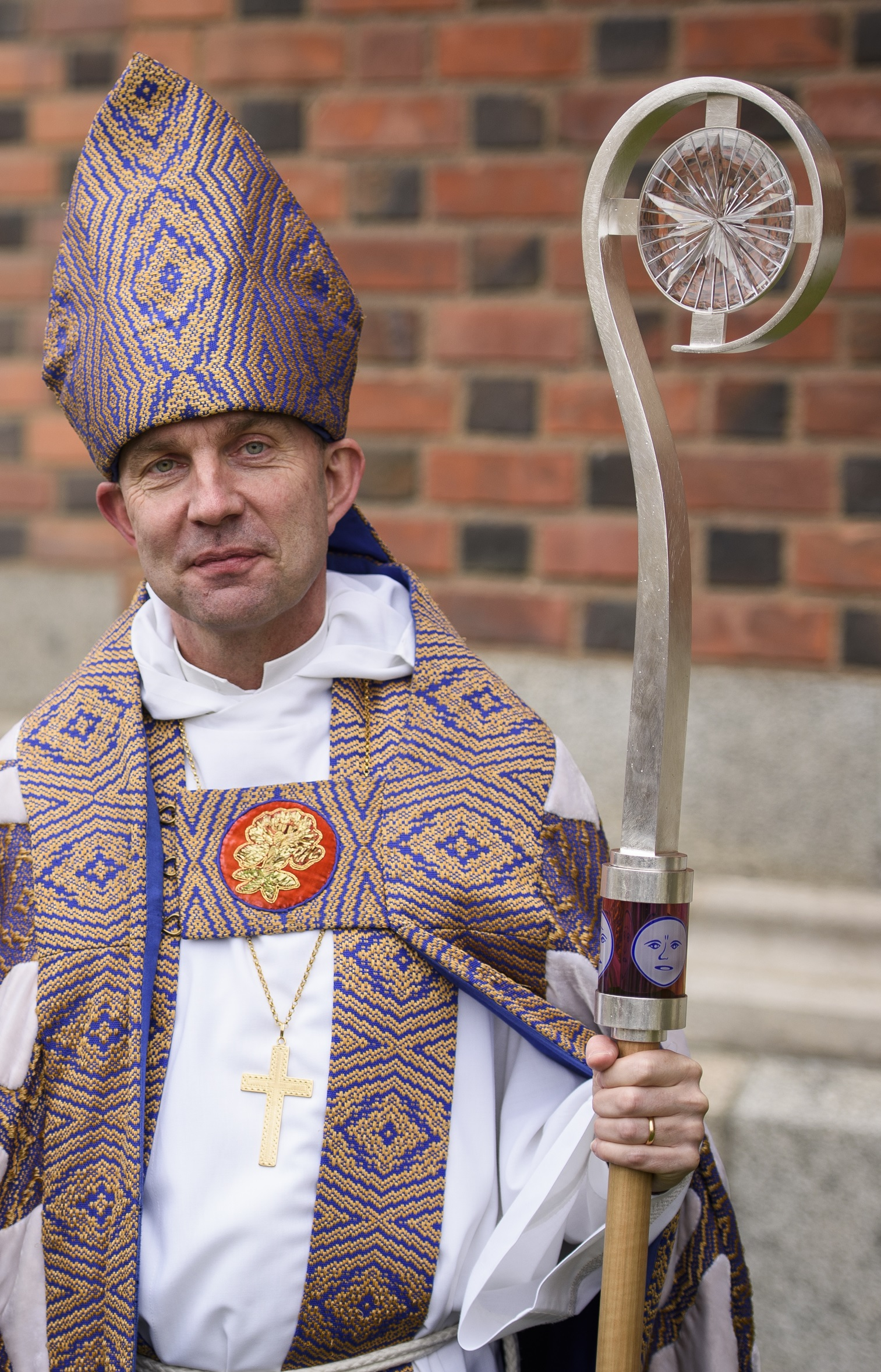
- Church: Church of Sweden
- Diocese: Växjö
- Appointed: 2015
- Predecessor: Jan-Olof Johansson

Orders
- Ordination: 1991
- Consecration: 12 April 2015 by Antje Jackelén

Personal details
- Born: 19 October 1964 (age 61) Jönköping, Sweden
- Denomination: Lutheran
- Parents: Adjuncts Nils Modéus and Ingrid Modéus
- Spouse: Carina Modéus
- Children: 3
- Education: Lund University
- Motto: Sufficit tibi gratia Dei (God's grace is all you need)

Fredrik Modéus (born 19 October 1964 in Jönköping) is a Swedish theologian and bishop, currently the 59th Bishop of Växjö.

== Priest ==
Modéus was ordained in 1991 for the Diocese of Växjö. After he served as vicar in Värnamo between 1991 and 1992. In 1992–1994, he served as a school chaplain in Hässleholm and between 1995 and 1996 as a school chaplain at Oskarshamns folkhøjskole. In 1996, Modéus moved to Lund and took office as a student clergyman, after which he served as supervisory director between 1997 and 1999 in the Helgealand Assembly. In 2000, he became a minister at the church of Helgeand in Lund. Between 2009 and 2014, he studied for a PhD at Lund University graduating in systematic theology on 13 May 2015 with his dissertation titled The Worship Community in the People's Church (Gudstjänstgemenskap i folkkyrkan).

== Bishop ==
In the spring of 2014, he was a candidate for the Bishopric of Lund, where he ended up in second place after Johan Tyrberg. In the autumn of the same year he once again took part in another election, this time for the bishopric of Växjö, where he ended up in the final round together with Thomas Petersson. On 3 December, he was elected with 58% of the votes. On 12 April 2015, he was consecrated bishop in the Uppsala cathedral.

== Personal life ==
Fredrik Modéus is the son of Adjuncts Nils Modéus and Ingrid Modéus, as well as brother of Archbishop of Sweden Martin Modéus and lawyer Daniel Modéus. Fredrik Modéus is married to the doctor Carina Modéus. Together they have three children.
