= Bodarp Church =

- Bodarps kyrka
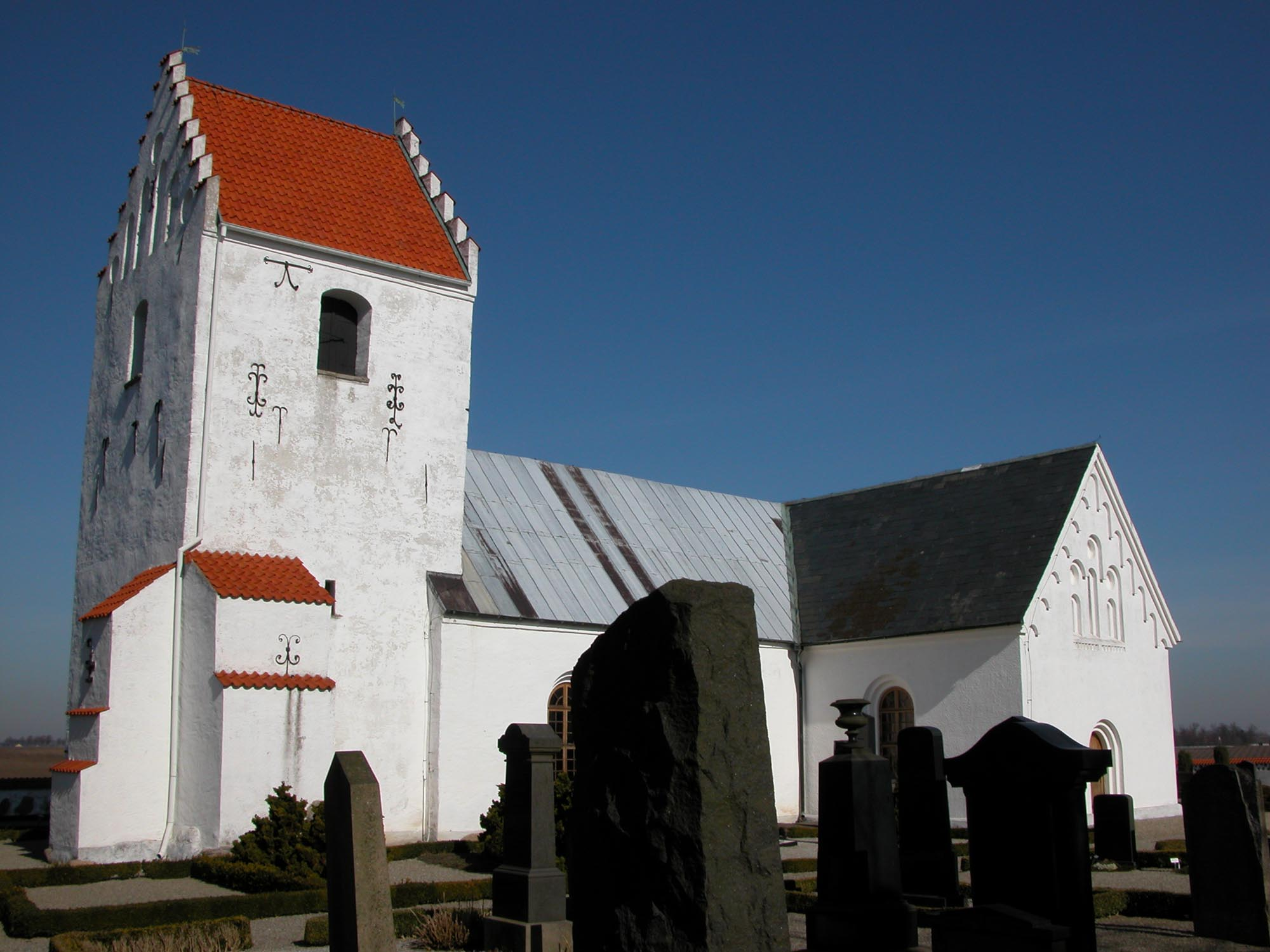
- Bodarp Church

- 55°26′10″N 13°04′08″E
- Country: Sweden
- Denomination: Church of Sweden

Administration
- Diocese: Lund

Bodarp Church (Swedish: Bodarps kyrka) is a medieval Lutheran church in the province of Scania, Sweden. It belongs to the Diocese of Lund.

== History and architecture ==
Bodarp Church is a largely Romanesque church dating from the late 12th or early 13th century. It has been successively enlarged and rebuilt during the following centuries: the tower dates from the end of the Middle Ages while the north and south transept were added during the 19th century. Internally, the church received vaults during the 15th century. The church was renovated in 1938. The church has an altarpiece from the 17th century, a baptismal font from the same century and a pulpit from 1860. The church bells date from 1594 and 1788 respectively; the oldest was manufactured in Lübeck.
