= Bonderup Church =

- Bonderups kyrka
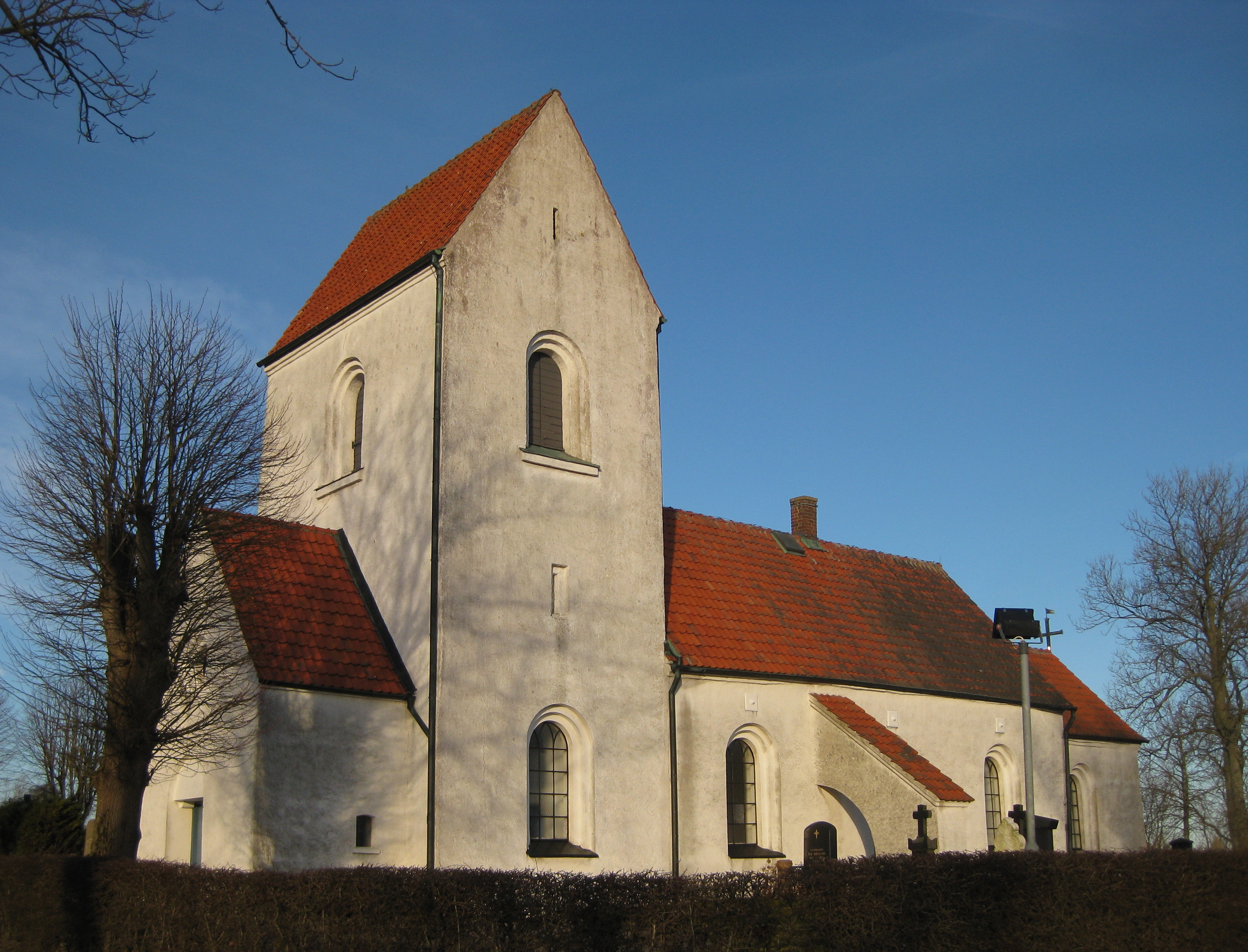
- Bonderup Church

- 55°38′24″N 13°21′20″E
- Country: Sweden
- Denomination: Church of Sweden

Administration
- Diocese: Lund

Bonderup Church (Swedish: Bonderups kyrka) is a medieval church in the province of Scania, Sweden. It belongs to the Diocese of Lund.

== History and architecture ==
The church was probably built during the 12th century and altered in the 13th century. The original church seems to have had some kind of westwork, probably housing the baptismal font, and a choir without an apse. The interior vaults were added during the first half of the 15th century. At the same time, the nave was slightly enlarged. A church porch was another late medieval addition, which however was removed during the 19th century. In the 19th century, a tower was added to the church but destroyed by lightning in 1916. The presently visible tower was thus built during the 20th century. The oldest of the church fittings is the larger of the two church bells, made in 1536. The pulpit is from 1763, and some of the church silver from 1749.
