= Hardeberga Church =

- Hardeberga kyrka
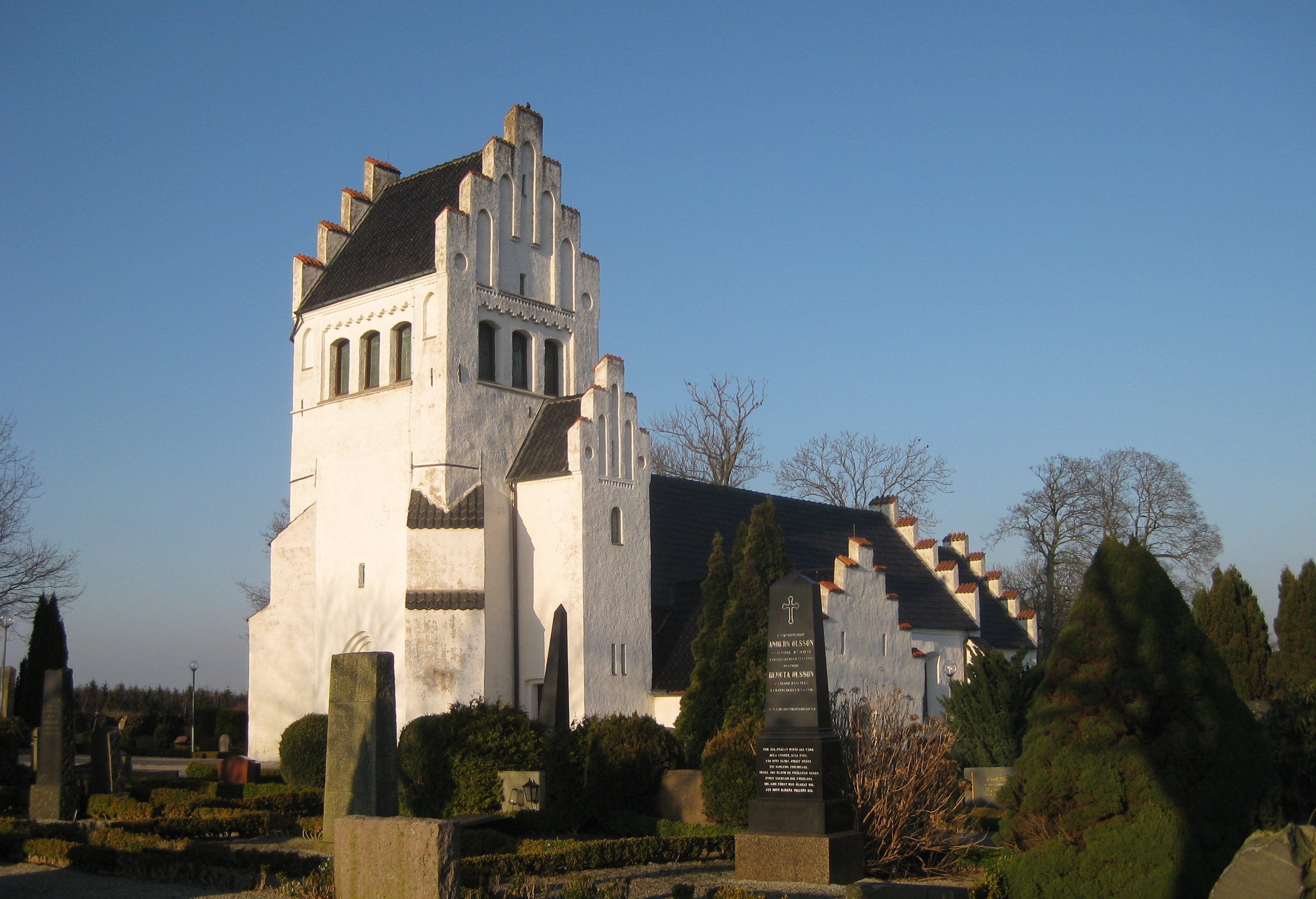
- Hardeberga Church

- 55°41′52″N 13°17′37″E
- Country: Sweden
- Denomination: Church of Sweden

Hardeberga Church (Swedish: Hardeberga kyrka) is a medieval Lutheran church in the province of Scania, Sweden. It belongs to the Diocese of Lund.

== History and architecture ==
The church was probably erected at the end of the 12th century, and has later been enlarged. The tower dates from the late Middle Ages. A renovation and partial reconstruction of the church was carried out in 1909. The church contains a medieval baptismal font, a chalice from the 16th century and an altarpiece dating from the 17th century. Of the two church bells, the smaller one is the oldest, made in the 13th century. The church is decorated inside with murals made in 1909 by Gottfrid Pettersson. The stained glass windows were made in 1952 by Carl Andersson.
