= Anders Wejryd =

Swedish Lutheran clergyman (born 1948)

The Most Reverend Anders Wejryd
- Archbishop Emeritus of Uppsala; Primate Emeritus of Sweden
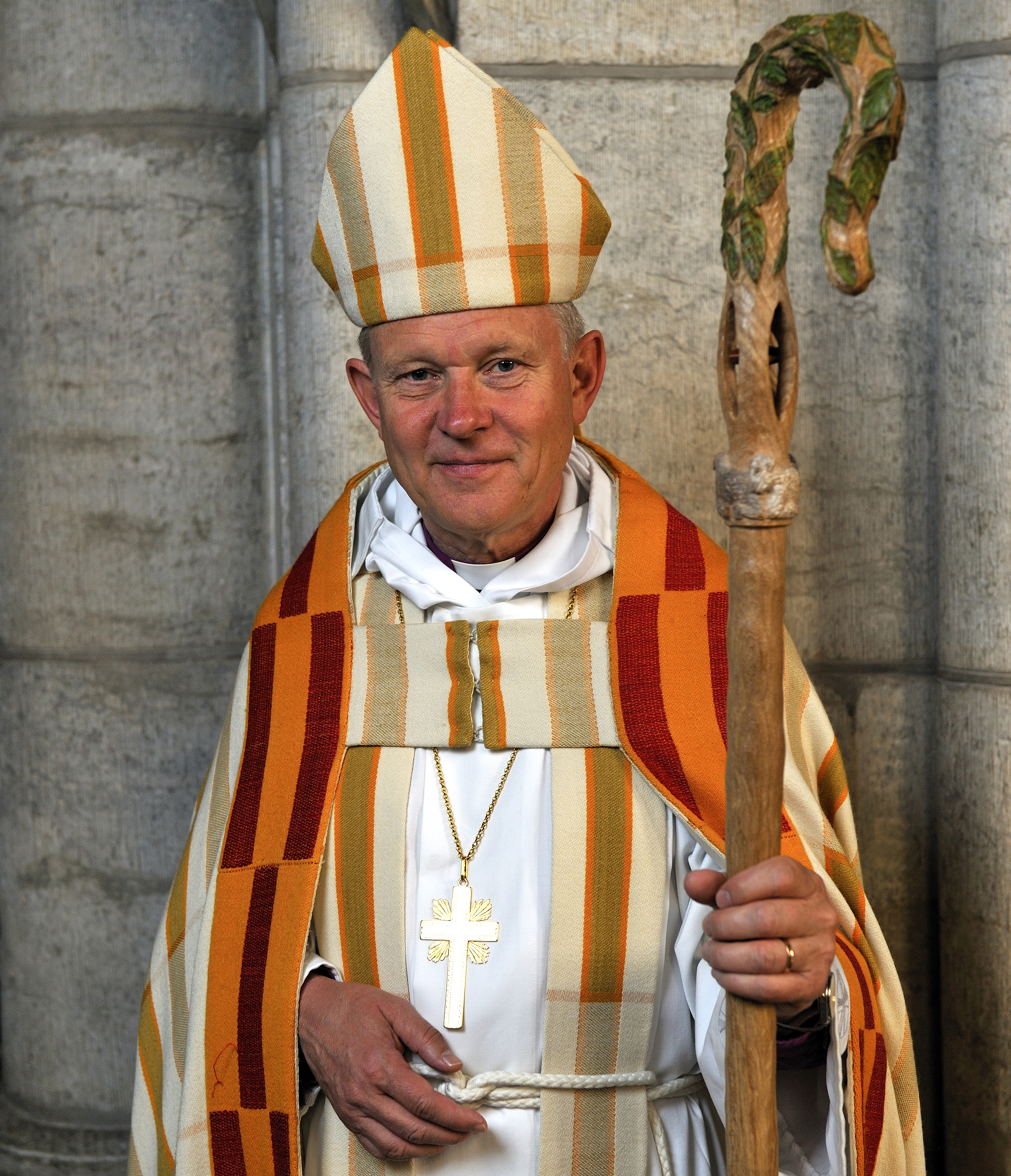
- Wejryd in 2009
- Church: Church of Sweden
- Diocese: Uppsala
- Elected: 30 March 2006
- Installed: 2 September 2006
- Term ended: 15 June 2014
- Predecessor: K. G. Hammar
- Successor: Antje Jackelén
- Previous post: Bishop of Växjö (1995–2006)

Orders
- Ordination: 17 December 1972 (priest)
- Consecration: 17 December 1995 by Gunnar Weman

Personal details
- Born: Anders Harald Wejryd; 8 August 1948 (age 78) Falköping, Sweden
- Denomination: Lutheran
- Parents: Harald Wejryd; Birgitta Lagher
- Spouse: Kajsa Wejryd (née Malmfors)
- Children: 3
- Education: Uppsala University
- Motto: Parate viam Domini; (Prepare the Way of the Lord)

Ordination history of Anders Wejryd
History
Priestly ordination
- Date: 17 December 1972
- Place: Västerås
Episcopal consecration
- Consecrated by: Gunnar Weman
- Date: 17 December 1995
- Place: Uppsala Cathedral

Anders Harald Wejryd (born 8 August 1948) is a Swedish Lutheran clergyman. Having been Bishop of Växjö since 1995, he was elected Archbishop of Uppsala and primate of the Church of Sweden in March 2006 and took office in September of the same year. He left office in 2014, and was replaced with Antje Jackelén.

== Early life and ministry ==
Wejryd studied at Uppsala University, where he received his Bachelor of Divinity degree in 1972. In the same year, he was ordained priest in Västerås. He has served as priest in Västerås, Munktorp and Arboga, and was vicar of the parish Munktorp-Odensvi from 1978 to 1985, and vicar of Arboga parish and rural dean of the deanery Köping-Arboga from 1985 to 1987. In the 1980s, he continued part-time doctoral studies, doing research on Nathan Söderblom's missionary work until 1987, when his new job left him no time to continue. From 1987 to 1995 he was director of Ersta diakonisällskap (a church-connected foundation in Stockholm running a small hospital, social care activities and a nursing college), before becoming Bishop of Växjö in 1995, and Archbishop of Uppsala in 2006.

== Archiepiscopacy ==
Wejryd was the first Archbishop to be elected after the separation of the Church of Sweden from the state on 1 January 2000. This meant that the Government of Sweden had no role in his appointment. In the preliminary election on 8 February 2006, he received 33% of the votes among 14 candidates (of which only eight received any votes at all). In the first round of voting on 15 March, six candidates remained, and Wejryd received a plurality of votes, 44.6%, but not an absolute majority, with Ragnar Persenius as runner-up at 30.8%. A second round of voting between Wejryd and Persenius was arranged on 30 March, when Wejryd received 176 votes (58.1%) against 127 for Persenius.

Wejryd took up his office on 2 September 2006. He met with Pope Benedict XVI in March 2007. In June 2010, he officiated at the wedding of Crown Princess Victoria and Daniel Westling.

Titles in Lutheranism
Preceded by K. G. Hammar	Archbishop of Uppsala; Lutheran Primate of Sweden; 2006–2014	Succeeded by Antje Jackelén
