= Karlstad Cathedral =

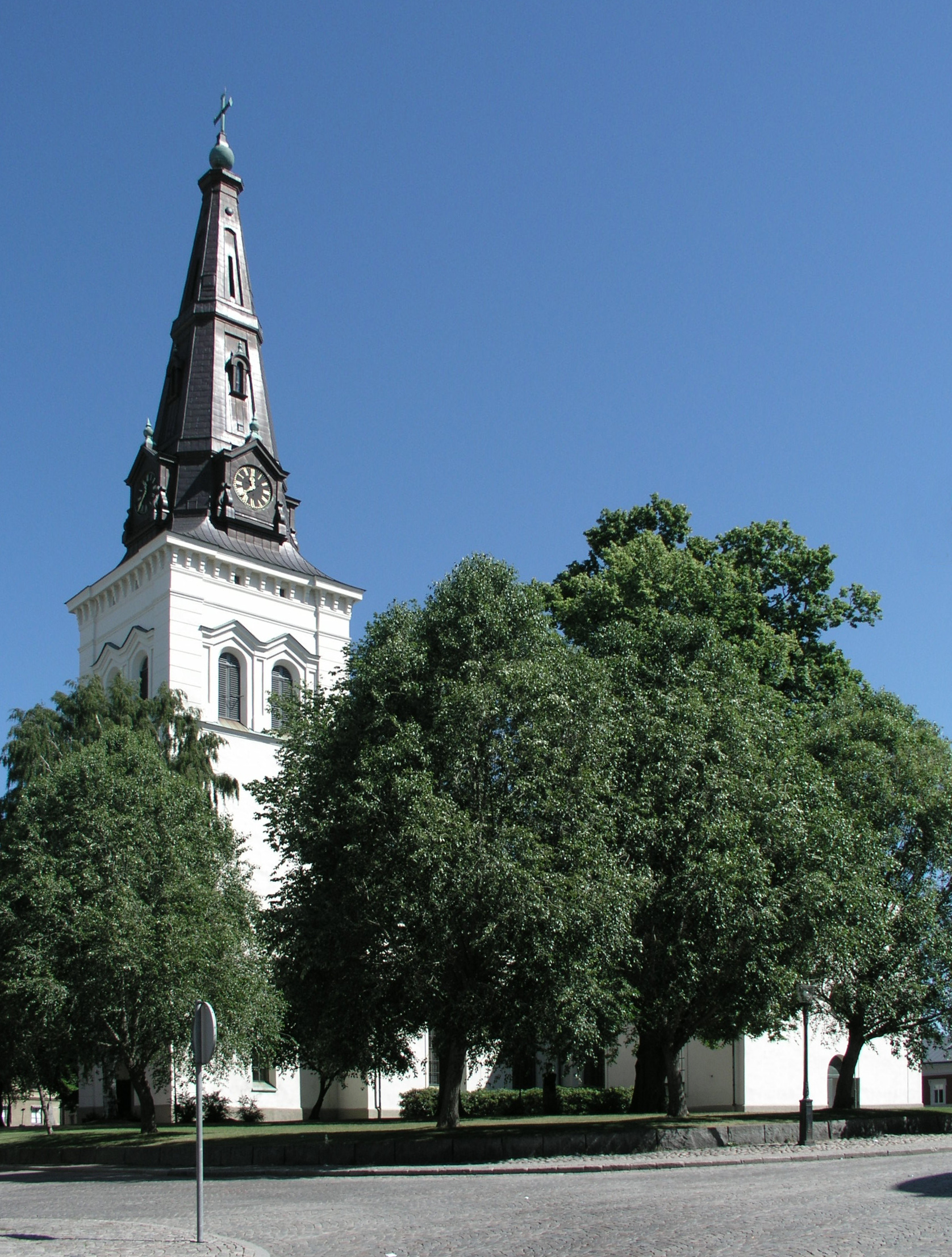
- Karlstad Cathedral in July 2006
- Karlstad Cathedral
- 59°22′54″N 13°30′23″E
- Location: Karlstad
- Country: Sweden
- Denomination: Church of Sweden

History
- Consecrated: 13 July 1730 (2 July 1730, Old Style)

Administration
- Diocese: Diocese of Karlstad

Clergy
- Bishop: Sören Dalevi
- Dean: Dan Fredriksson

Karlstad Cathedral (Swedish: Karlstads domkyrka) is a cathedral in Karlstad, Sweden. The church is located in the middle of Karlstad on Lagberget on Tingvalla island. It belongs to Karlstad Cathedral Parish of the Diocese of Karlstad of the Church of Sweden.

== History ==
There has been a church on the site since the 1300s. That church was burned down together with virtually the entire city in 1616. Subsequently rebuilt, Karlstad became a cathedral in 1647 when Queen Christina (1626–1689) established the Diocese of Karlstad. That church also burned down in 1719. A new church was erected in 1723–1730 at Lagberget on Tingvalla Island, under the direction of Superintendent Johannes Steuchius (1676–1742) who later became Archbishop. The church is built in a Baroque style and was inaugurated on 13 July 1730 (2 July 1730 according to the Old Style).

In 1790, architect Erik Palmstedt (1741-1803) designed a new choral interior with a new altar and pulpit. The roof and tower of Karlstad Cathedral were destroyed by the big city fire on 2 July 1865, when almost all of Karlstad was put in ashes. After the fire, the tower got its current neoclassical look after drawings by architect Albert Törnqvist (1819-1898). The interior restoration did not take place until the end of the 1870s. The church was restored in 1915–1916. In 1956–1957, a new large sacristy was built on two floors to the east. In 1965–1967, the church was restored. The cathedral was additionally renovated in 1998.

== Gallery ==
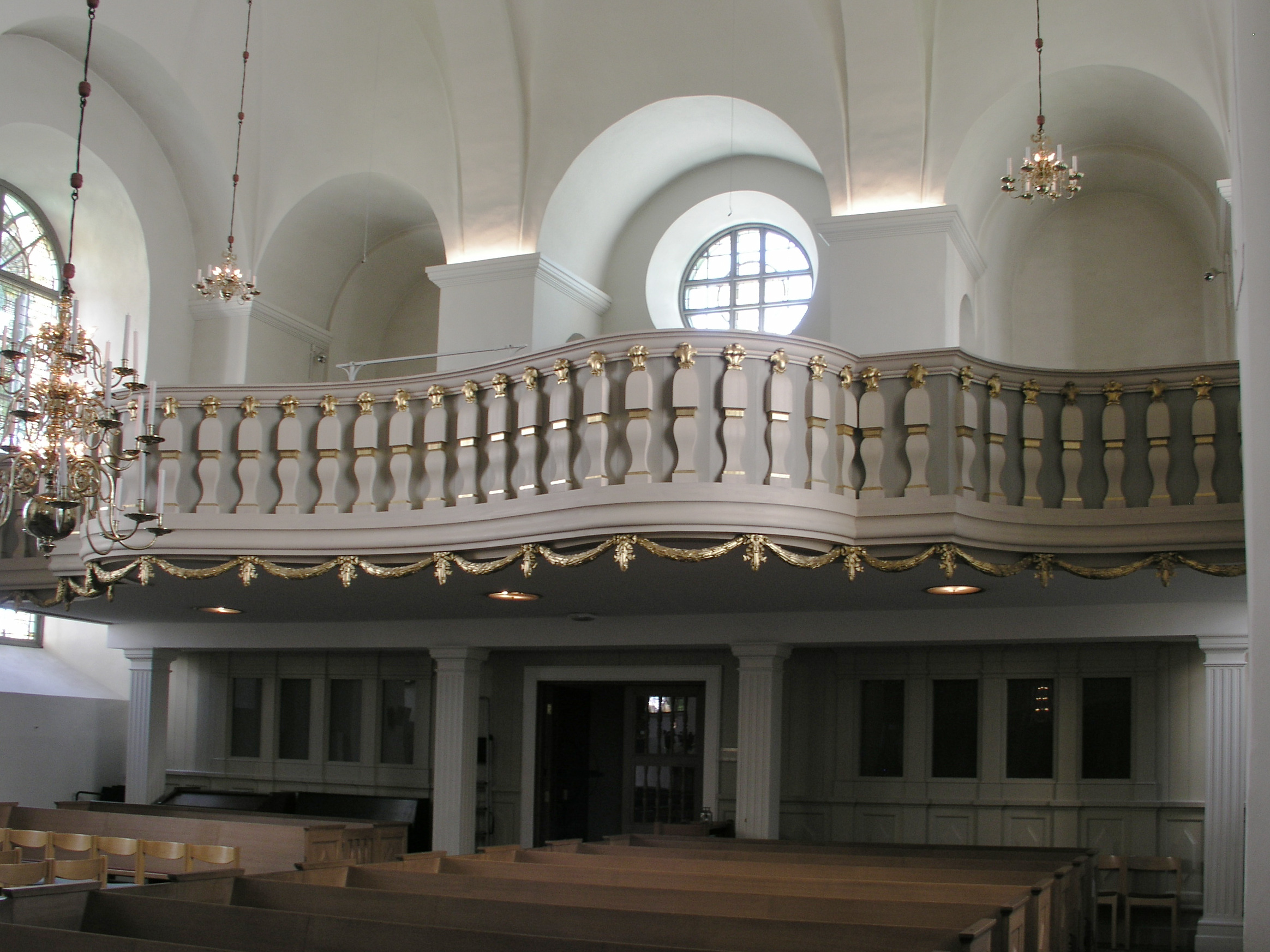
Balcony

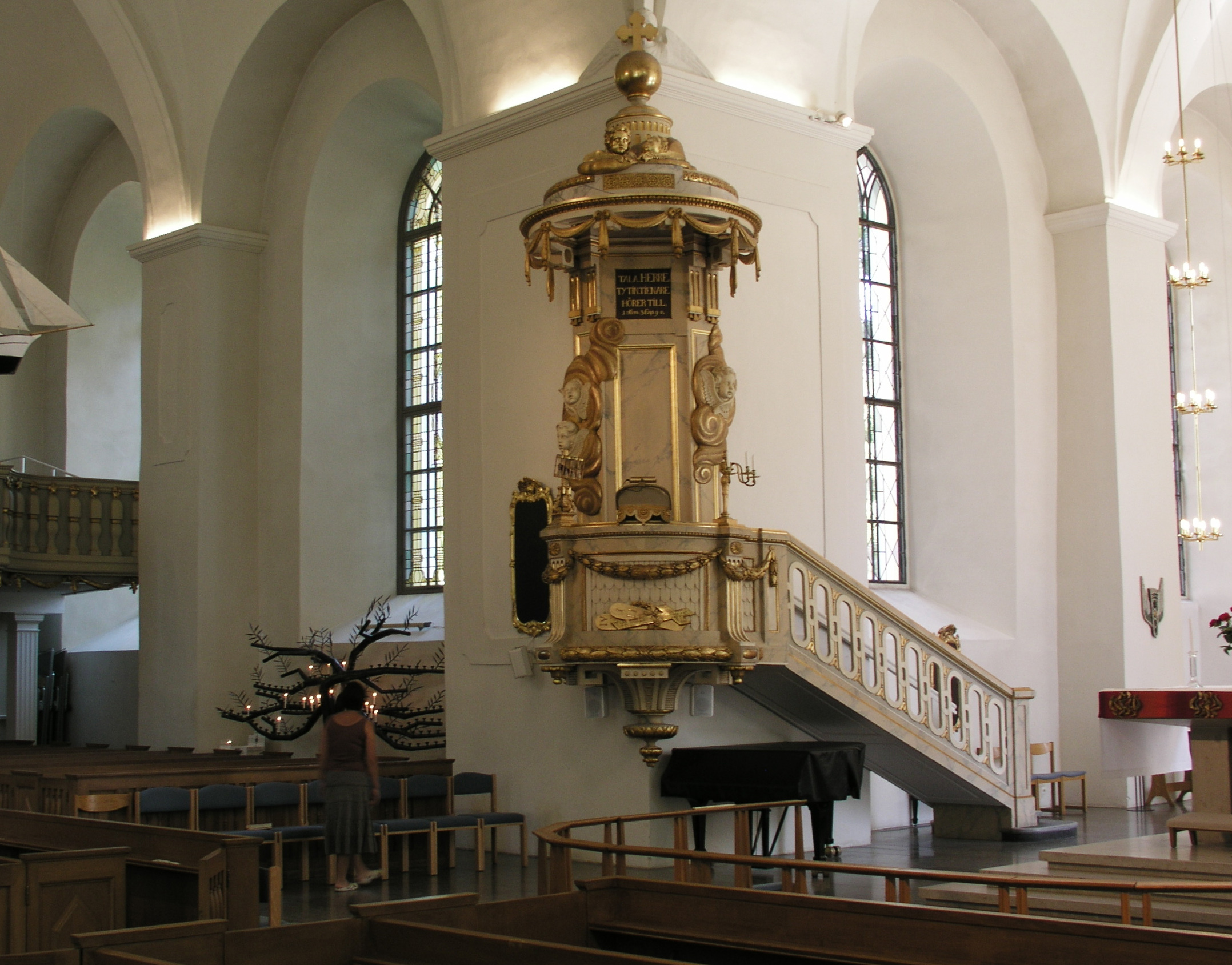
Pulpit

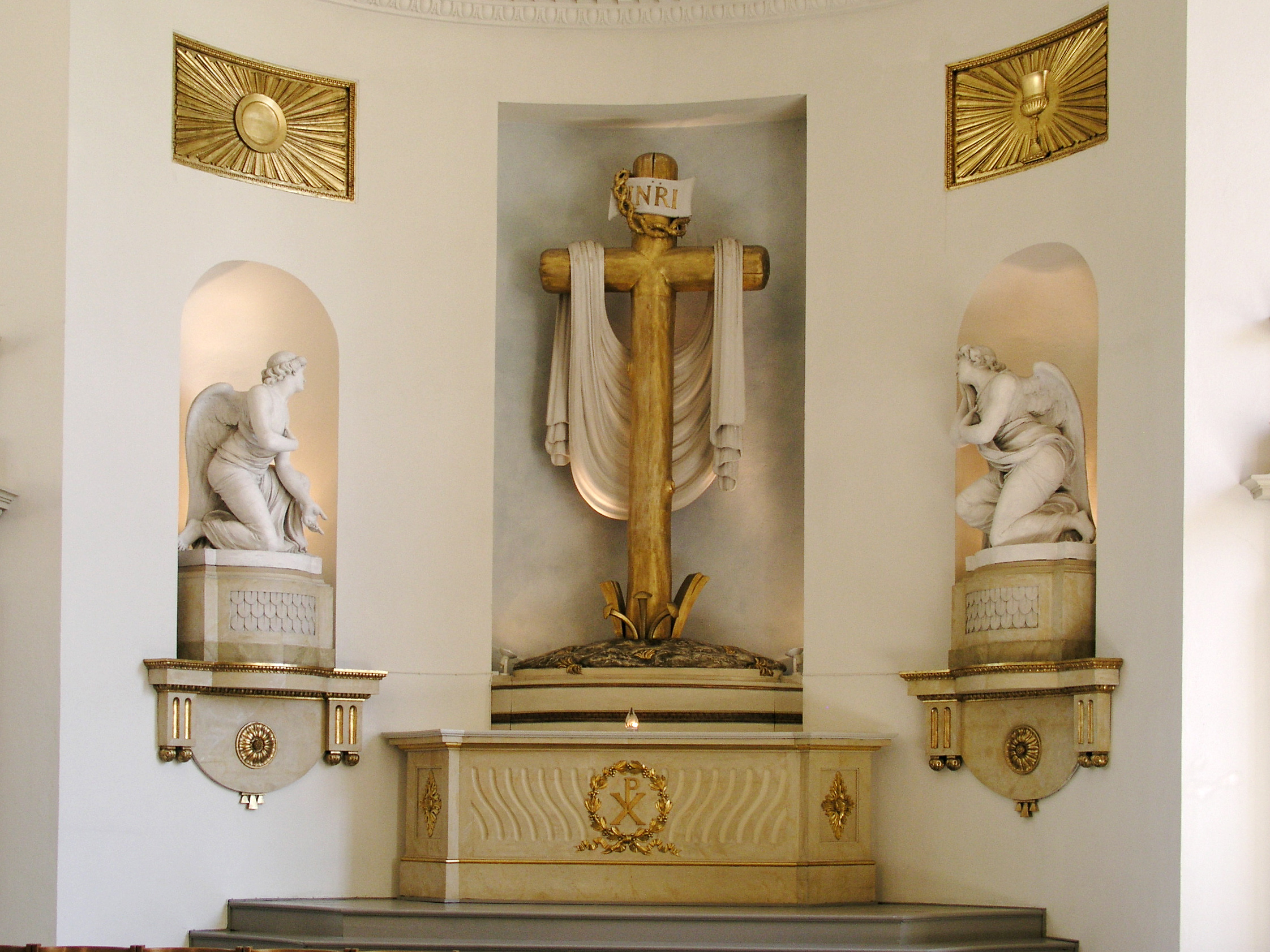
Altar

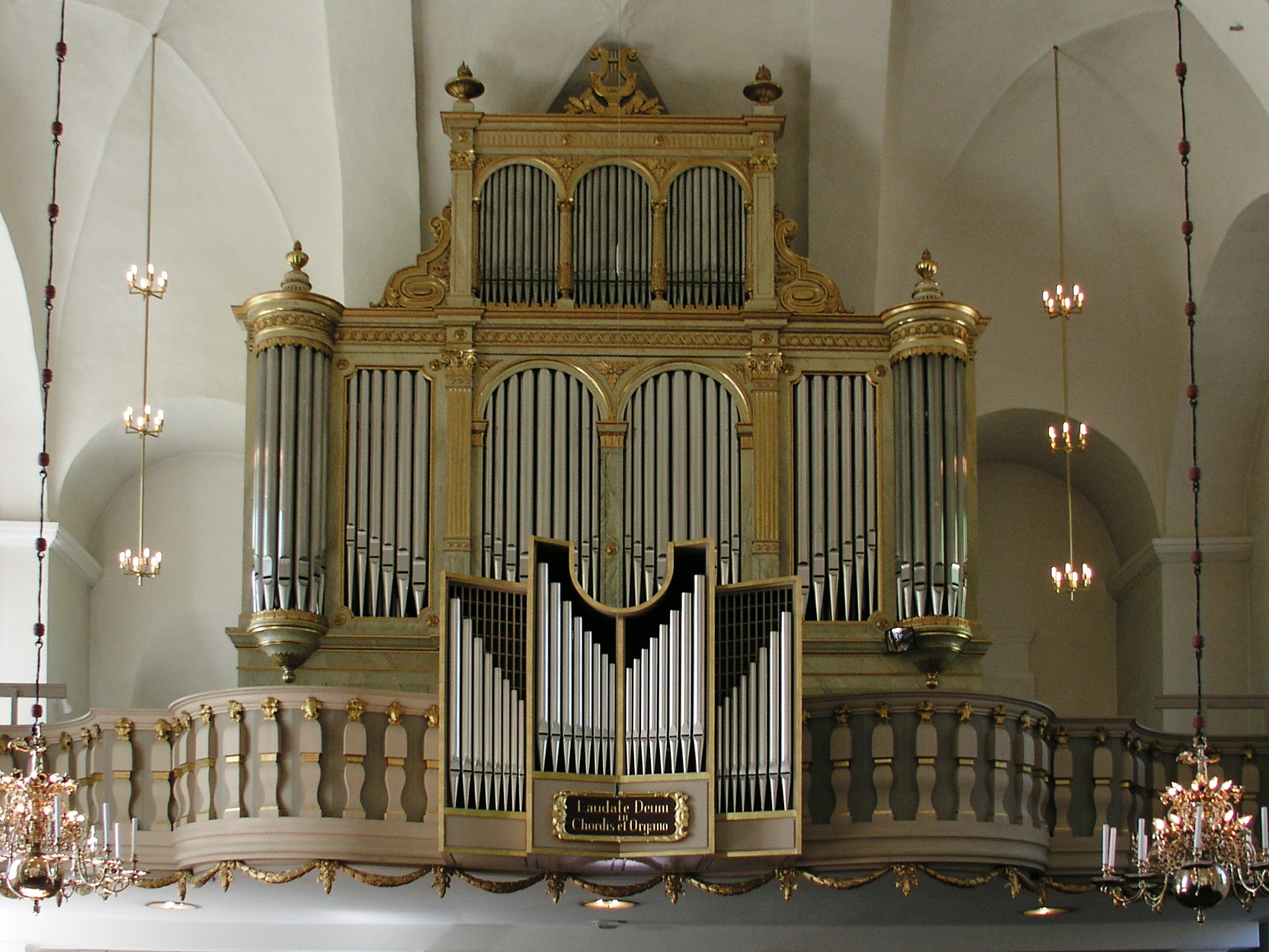
Organ
