= Diocese of Karlstad =

Diocese of Karlstad Diocesis Carolostadiensis Karlstads stift
- Arms of the diocese of Karlstad

- Flag

Location
- Country: Sweden
- Deaneries: 8 kontrakt
- Coordinates: 59°22′54″N 13°30′23″E

Statistics
- Parishes: 50
- Congregations: 88

Information
- Denomination: Church of Sweden
- Established: 1581
- Cathedral: Karlstad Cathedral

Current leadership
- Bishop: Sören Dalevi
- Metropolitan Archbishop: Antje Jackelén

Map

Website
- www.svenskakyrkan.se

The Diocese of Karlstad (Swedish: Karlstads stift) is a diocese of the Church of Sweden with its episcopal see in the city of Karlstad. It covers most of the provinces Värmland and Dalsland. Its current borders are from 1693.

== List of bishops ==
- Sveno Benedicti Elfdalius, 1647–1666
- Andreas Birgeri Kilander, 1666–1673
- Jonas Johannis Scarinius, 1673
- Erlandus Svenonis Broman, 1673–1693
- Benedictus Svenonis Camoenius, 1693–1704
  - Vacant (1704–1706)
- Jonas Laurentii Arnell, 1706–1707
  - Vacant (1707–1709)
- Torsten Rudeen, 1709–1717
- Daniel Norlindh, 1717–1718
- Ingemund Bröms, 1718–1722
- Johannes Steuchius, 1723–1731
- Magnus Petri Aurivillius, 1731–1740
  - Vacant (1740–1742)
- Nils Lagerlöf, 1742–1769
  - Vacant (1769–1771)
- Jöran Claes Schröder, 1771–1773
  - Vacant (1773–1775)
- Daniel Henrik Herweghr, 1775–1787
  - Vacant (1787–1789)
- Herman Schröderheim, 1789–1802
  - Vacant (1802–1805)
- Olof Bjurbäck, 1805–1829
- Johan Jacob Hedrén, 1830–1836
- Carl Adolf Agardh, 1836–1859
- Johan Anton Millen, 1859–1863
- Anton Niklas Sundberg, 1864–1870
  - Vacant (1870–1872)
- Claes Herman Rundgren, 1872–1906
- Johan Alfred Eklund, 1906–1938
- Arvid Runestam, 1938–1957
- Gert Borgenstierna, 1957–1976
- Sveninge Ingebrand, 1976–1986
- Bengt Wadensjö, 1986–2002
- Esbjörn Hagberg, 2002–2016
- Sören Dalevi, 2016–present
