= Hakarp's church =

Church building in Hakarp, Sweden

Coordinates: 57.7964°N 14.3114°E

Hakarp's church (Swedish: Hakarps kyrka) is a church building in Hakarp parish in the Huskvarna pastorate of the Diocese of Växjö. The church is located in Hakarp's kyrkby and is a pink cross church and church of interest that was built in 1694. Before the stone church, there were two churches: a stave church, which was built in the middle of the 12th century, and a church built of lying logs, which was built around 1283 The wooden church from the 13th century was demolished at the same time as the current stone church was built. In the new church there is, among other things, a crucifix which is believed to have belonged to the church since the first one was built.

== Sources ==
- Per-Åke Andersson: Till minnet av Hakarps kyrka 300 år
- Harald Möllerström: Hakarps krönika 1970-1971
- Harry Bergenblad: Hakarps krönika 1971
