= Martin Modéus =

Swedish Lutheran clergyman

The Most Reverend Martin Modéus
- Archbishop of Uppsala; Primate of Sweden
- Modéus in 2026
- Church: Church of Sweden
- Archdiocese: Uppsala
- Elected: 8 June 2022
- Installed: 4 December 2022
- Predecessor: Antje Jackelén
- Previous post: Bishop of Linköping (2011–2022)

Orders
- Ordination: 1986
- Consecration: 6 March 2011 by Anders Wejryd

Personal details
- Born: Nils Martin Modéus; 1 March 1962 (age 64) Jönköping, Sweden
- Denomination: Lutheran
- Residence: Archbishop's Palace, Uppsala
- Spouse: Marianne Modéus
- Children: 3
- Motto: Levande tillsammans med Kristus ("Alive together with Christ")
- Coat of arms

Nils Martin Modéus (born 1 March 1962) is a Swedish theologian and bishop who is Archbishop of Uppsala and primate of the Church of Sweden. Prior to this, he was bishop of the Diocese of Linköping from 2011 until 2022, when he was installed as Archbishop.

== Biography ==
Modéus was ordained a priest in 1986 for the Diocese of Växjö. He served as a curate and vicar of the parish of Byarum until 1988 when he became district leader and curate of the parish of Tullinge-Tumba in the Diocese of Stockholm. He held this position until 1995. In 1996, he was assigned by the Swedish church to write a book that resulted in the book Tradition och liv (Tradition and life) .

From 1997 to 1999, Modéus undertook a PhD in Old Testament exegesis at the University of Lund. From 2000 to 2003, Modéus worked once more as a curate in Tullinge-Tumba. In 2003, he took up the post of diocesan curate in the Diocese of Stockholm, responsible for church service development. He held this task until March 2011, when he was elected and ordained bishop of Linköping.

Martin Modéus is the son of junior lecturers Nils Modéus and Ingrid Modéus. He has two brothers: Fredrik Modéus, born in 1964, Bishop of the Diocese of Växjö and Daniel Modéus, born 1970, attorney in Stockholm. He is married to Marianne Langby Modéus and has three children from a previous marriage

On 8 June 2022, he was elected Archbishop of Uppsala and primate of the Church of Sweden and installed in Uppsala Cathedral on 4 December 2022.

Titles in Lutheranism
Preceded by Martin Lind	Bishop of Linköping; 2011–2022	Succeeded by Marika Markovits
Preceded by Antje Jackelén	Archbishop of Uppsala; Lutheran Primate of Sweden; 2022–present	Incumbent
