= Simlinge Church =

Coordinates: 55°23′27″N 13°17′12″E

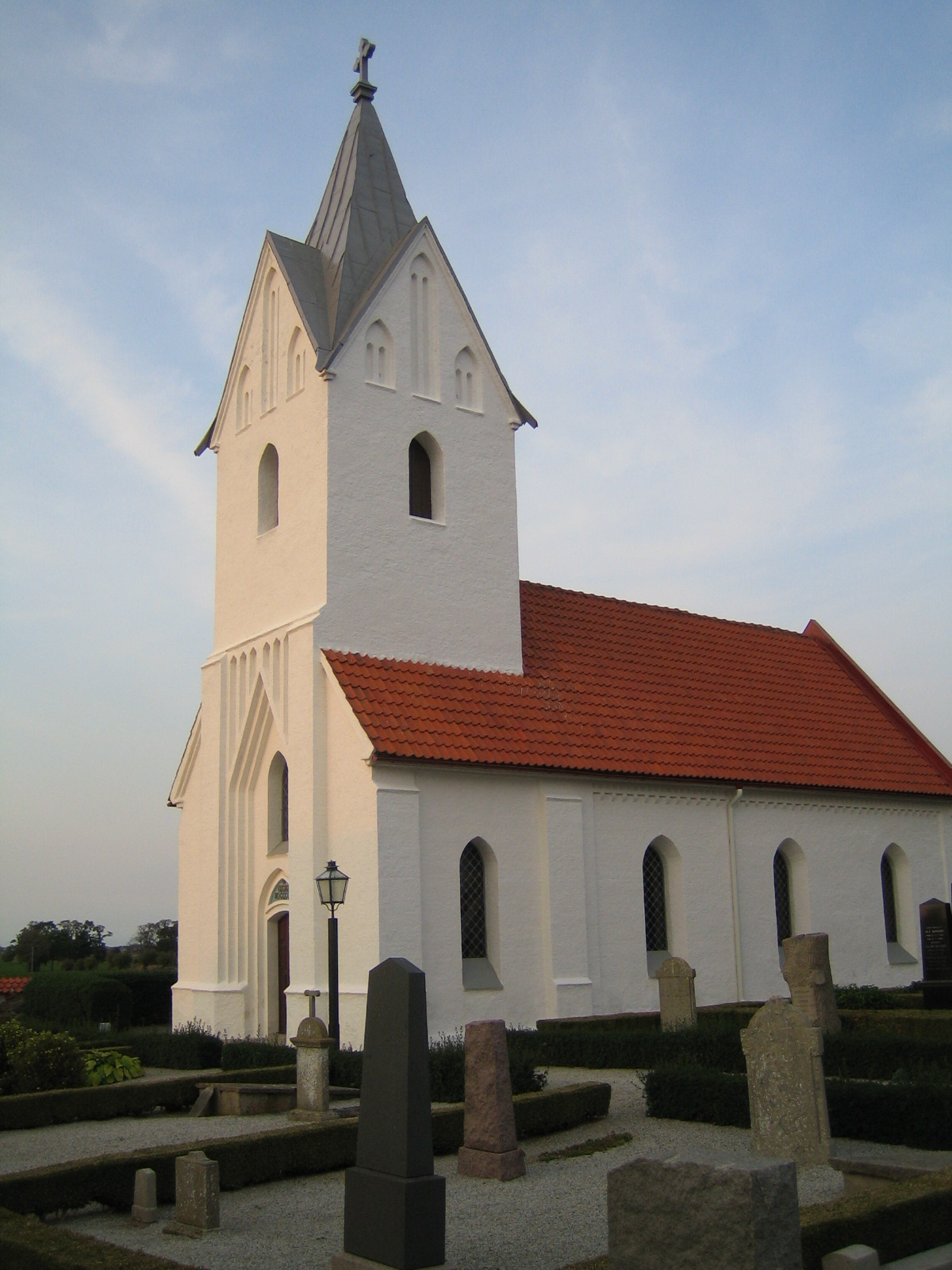
Simlinge Church, external view

Simlinge Church (Swedish: Simlinge kyrka) is a medieval Lutheran church north-east of Trelleborg, Sweden. It belongs to the Diocese of Lund.

== History and architecture ==
The church dates from circa 1200 and is constructed of brick. During the 15th century, the original wooden ceiling was replaced with the currently visible vaults. The tower dates from 1852.
