= Sören Dalevi =

Swedish prelate and theologian

The Right Reverend Sören Dalevi
- Bishop of Karlstad
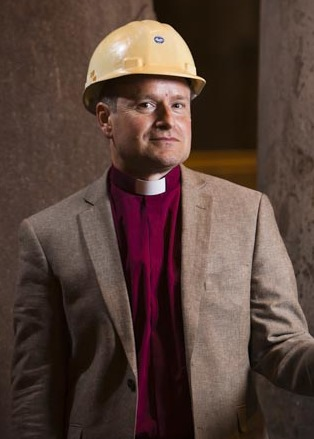
- Church: Church of Sweden
- Diocese: Karlstad
- Elected: 28 April 2016
- Predecessor: Esbjörn Hagberg

Orders
- Ordination: 7 January 1996 by Bengt Wadensjö
- Consecration: 28 August 2016 by Antje Jackelén

Personal details
- Born: 12 June 1969 (age 56) Björneborg, Sweden
- Spouse: Veronica Dalevi
- Children: 3
- Coat of arms

Sören Dalevi (born 12 June 1969 in Björneborg) is a Swedish prelate and theologian. Since 2012, he has been a lecturer in religious studies at Karlstad University. In 2016, he was elected as Bishop of Karlstad.

== Biography ==
Sören Dalevi was ordained as a priest in 1996, after which he became vicar in the parish of Grums. He was the founder of youth work in the Diocese of Karlstad between 1997 and 2000 and committees in the parish of Norrstrands in Karlstad between 2000 and 2003. He then pursued research studies at Karlstad University. Between 2008 and 2012, Dalevi was a member of the school board at Geijerskolan. Dalevi's research focused on church education.

On 28 April 2016, he was elected Bishop of Karlstad. At the preliminary voting session, Sören Dalevi received 59.1% of the votes. The other candidate who took part in the election, Karin Johannesson, gained 40.9% of the votes.
