= Johan Tyrberg =

The Right Reverend Johan Tyrberg
- Bishop of Lund
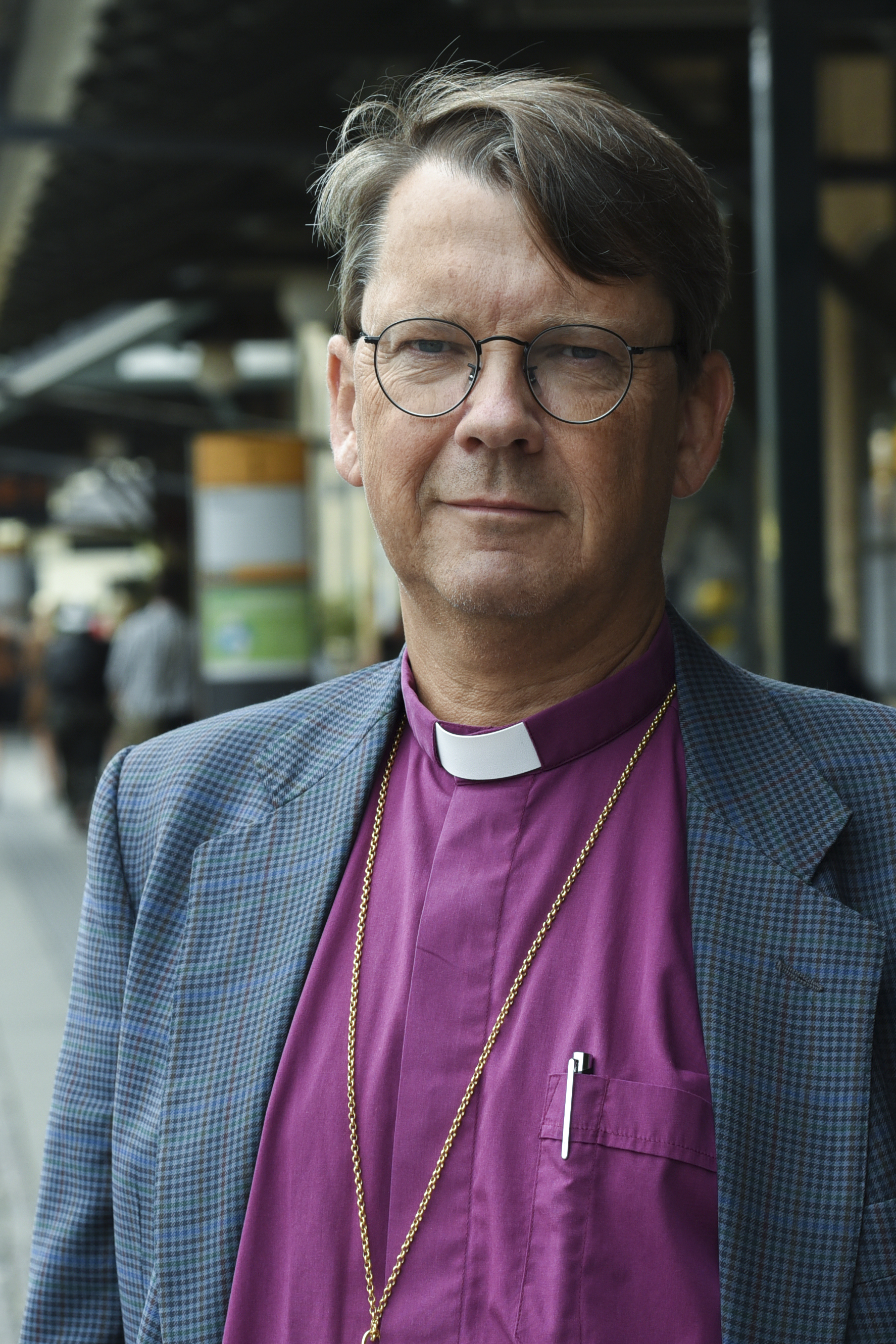
- Church: Church of Sweden
- Diocese: Lund
- Elected: 1 April 2014
- Predecessor: Antje Jackelén

Orders
- Ordination: 1990
- Consecration: 24 August 2014 by Antje Jackelén

Personal details
- Born: 20 June 1963 (age 62) Tyringe, Sweden
- Children: 3
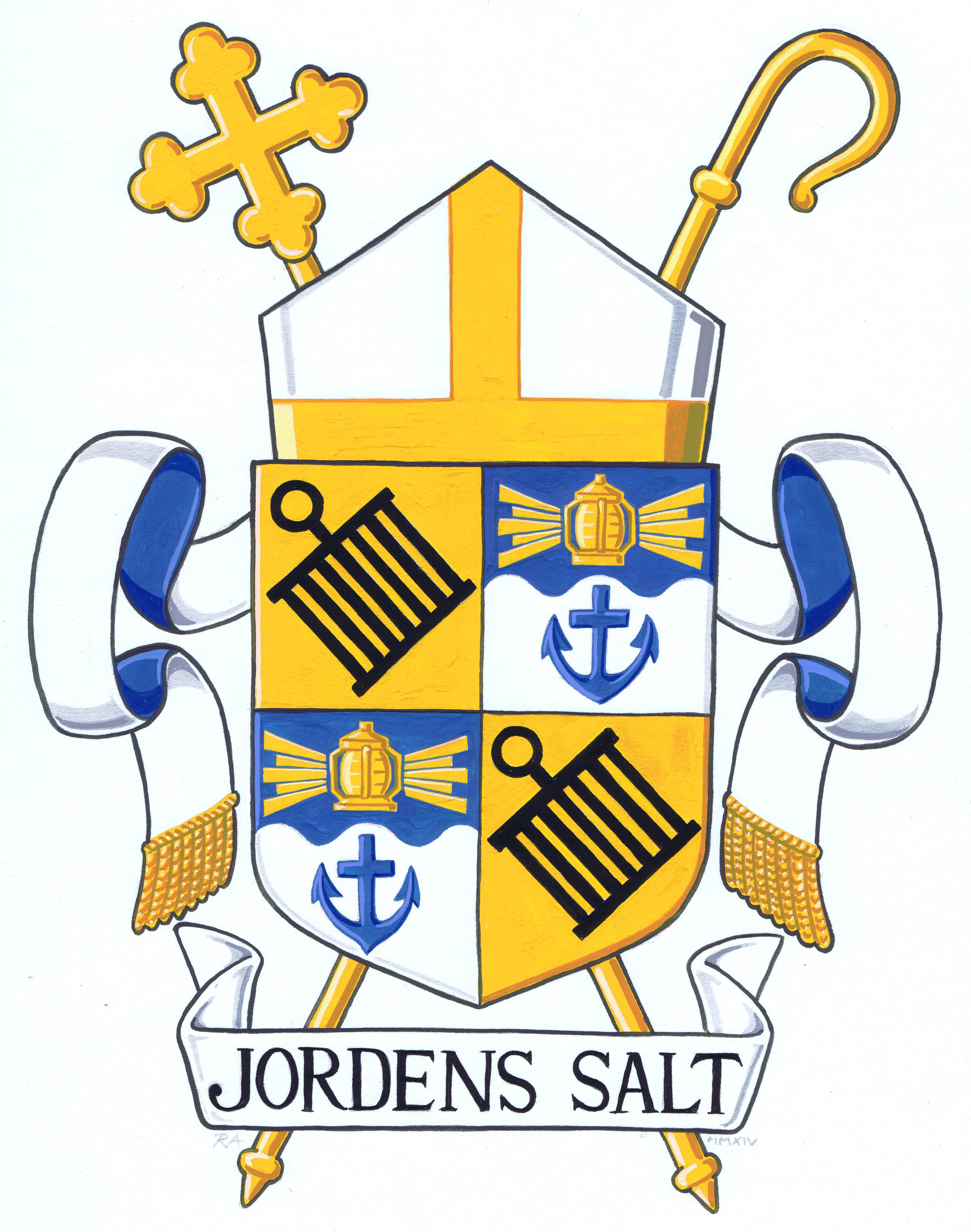
- Coat of arms

Johan Arvid Tyrberg (born 20 June 1963 in Tyringe) is a Swedish prelate, serving as the 69th bishop of the Diocese of Lund. He is the nephew of Bishop Emeritus Karl-Johan Tyrberg.

== Biography ==
Tyrberg studied at Lund University and was ordained in 1990. After serving in various quarters, including within the Swedish Church abroad, based in Frankfurt, he became vicar of Karlshamn parish in 2007. In 2009, he became rural dean of Lister och Bräkne. On 18 March 2014, Tyrberg was selected as a candidate for bishop with Fredrik Modéus, and was elected on to the second round of the election on 1 April by a large majority. He was ordained bishop in Uppsala Cathedral on 24 August 2014 and installed as bishop on 30 August of the same year.
