= Sjövik =

- Location within Västra Götaland Location within Sweden
- Coordinates: 57°55′N 12°22′E
- Country: Sweden
- Province: Västergötland
- County: Västra Götaland County
- Municipality: Lerum Municipality

Area
  - Total: 0.84 km^{2} (0.32 sq mi)

Population (31 December 2010)
  - Total: 905
  - Density: 1,078/km^{2} (2,790/sq mi)
- Time zone: UTC+1 (CET)
  - Summer (DST): UTC+2 (CEST)

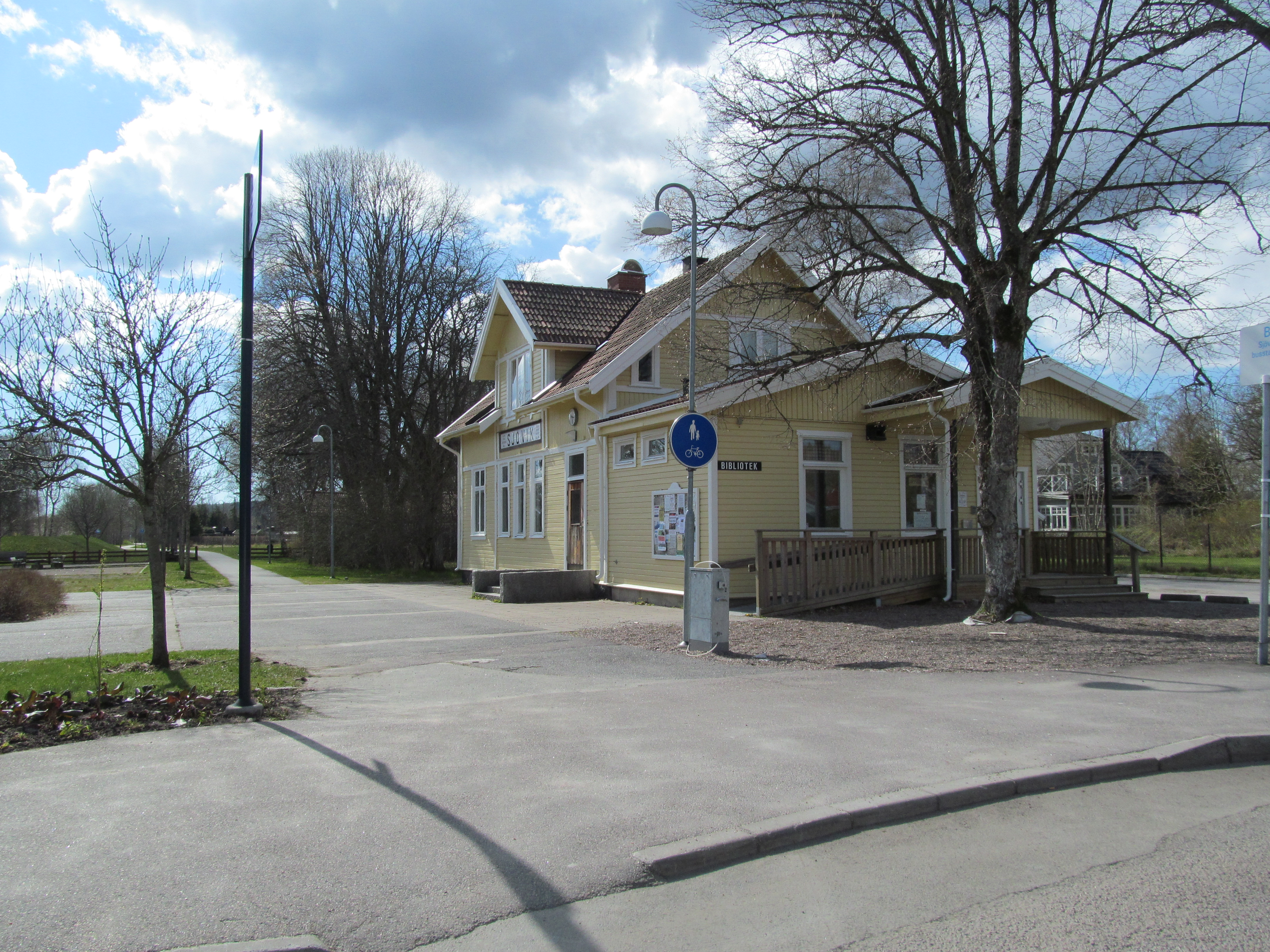
Sjövik library, previously Sjövik train station

Sjövik is a locality situated in Lerum Municipality, Västra Götaland County, Sweden. It had 905 inhabitants in 2010.
