= Diocese of Växjö =

Diocese of the Lutheran Church of Sweden

Diocese of Växjö Diocesis Vexionensis Växjö stift
- Arms of the diocese of Växjö

- Flag

Location
- Country: Sweden
- Deaneries: 16 kontrakt
- Coordinates: 56°52′39″N 14°48′43″E

Statistics
- Parishes: 97
- Congregations: 224

Information
- Denomination: Church of Sweden
- Established: 12th century
- Cathedral: Växjö Cathedral

Current leadership
- Bishop: Fredrik Modéus
- Metropolitan Archbishop: Martin Modéus, Archbishop of Uppsala

Map

Website
- svenskakyrkan.se/vaxjostift

The Diocese of Växjö (Swedish: Växjö stift) is one of 13 dioceses within the Lutheran Church of Sweden. Its episcopal see is located in the city of Växjö. The diocese was established in the 12th century as a Roman Catholic bishopric, but was taken over by the Church of Sweden as a result of the Protestant Reformation in Sweden.

The Lutheran Diocese of Växjö is situated in southern Sweden and includes most of the county of Jönköping at its north end, the southern and central parts of the county of Kalmar, the island of Öland in the east, the county of Kronoberg in the south, and a small part of the county of Halland in the west. The diocese consists of 249 parishes, and has the highest church attendance in Sweden.

== History ==
Within the Roman Catholic bishopric, the ancient episcopal see of Växjö comprised the regions Värend and Njudung in Småland. The chapter of Vexiö consisted of a dean, archdeacon, subdean, eleven prebendaries, and a schoolmaster.

Little is known about the origin of the diocese. In 1126, King Sigurd Magnusson of Norway is known to have led a crusade to Småland to Christianize its inhabitants. The Diocese of Växjö may have been established by the Danish, or it may have separated from the Diocese of Linköping between 1164 and 1170. The diocese's second known bishop was Stenar, who was mentioned in two letters dating to 1183. In 1191 he quarreled with the Bishop of Linköping concerning the borders of their respective dioceses. Stenar was succeeded in 1193 by John Ehrengisleson.

In the twelfth century, the construction of Växjö Cathedral began. The Cathedral made Växjö an important religious centre in the Diocese of Växjö. Saint Sigfrid allegedly lived and died in Växjö, and was buried in the cathedral at his death. He was the bishopric's patron saint and was canonized by Pope Adrian IV in 1158. Saint Sigfrid's shrine was, until the Protestant Reformation, the center of the Cathedral of St. John the Baptist and St. Sigfrid at Växjö. In 1205 the biography of Saint Sigfrid was written.

Bishop Gregory (about 1241), or his successor, renewed the boundary dispute with the Bishop of Linköping, which was settled by the pope in 1248 or 1249. Bishop Bo (1287–91) appealed in a dispute to the Archbishop of Lund, which was regarded as an insult to the Archbishop of Uppsala. Conflict was averted by Bo's death and a declaration of obedience to the Archbishop of Upsala, issued by the chapter of Vexiö. The most famous of the later bishops was Nicolaus Ragvaldi (1426–38), present at the Council of Basle, who became Archbishop of Uppsala in 1438. The last Roman Catholic bishop was Ingemar Petri (consecrated 1495), who, by judicious concessions, remained at Vexiö until his death in 1530. He took no part in episcopal consecrations during Gustav I Vasa's reign, when the Catholic hierarchy was replaced by the Lutheran state religion.
