= Antje Jackelén =

German-Swedish Lutheran cleric (born 1955)

The Most Reverend Antje Jackelén
- Archbishop Emerita of Uppsala; Primate Emerita of Sweden
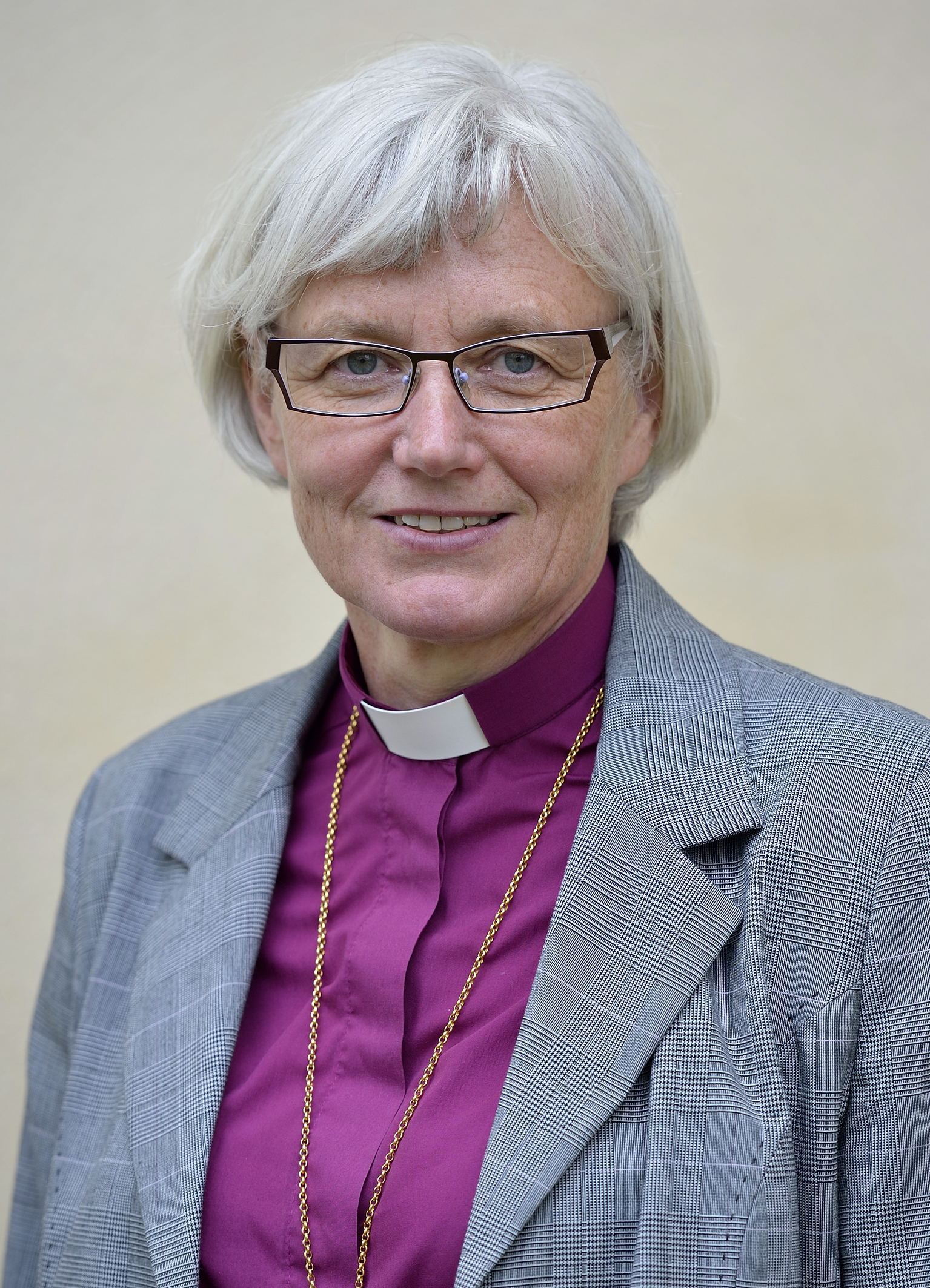
- Jackelén in 2013
- Church: Church of Sweden
- Archdiocese: Uppsala
- Elected: 15 October 2013
- Installed: 15 June 2014
- Term ended: 4 December 2022
- Predecessor: Anders Wejryd
- Successor: Martin Modéus
- Previous post: Bishop of Lund (2007–2014)

Orders
- Ordination: 1980 by Lars Carlzon
- Consecration: 15 April 2007 by Anders Wejryd

Personal details
- Born: Antje Zöllner; 4 June 1955 (age 71) Herdecke, North Rhine-Westphalia, West Germany
- Denomination: Lutheran
- Spouse: Heinz Jackelén (m. 1979)
- Children: 2
- Education: University of Tübingen; Uppsala University; Lund University
- Motto: Gud är större ("God is greater")
- Coat of arms
- Antje Jackelén's voice Introduces herself in the podcast K-podd; Recorded 22 July 2016

Antje Jackelén (Note: German: [ˈantjə jakəˈleːn], Swedish: [ˈǎnːɕɛ jakɛˈleːn].) (née Zöllner; (Note: German pronunciation: [ˈtsœlnɐ].) born 4 June 1955) is archbishop emerita and primate emerita (prima inter pares) of the Church of Sweden, the national church. On 15 October 2013, she was elected the 70th Archbishop of Uppsala and formally received through a service in Uppsala Cathedral on 15 June 2014, making her Sweden's first foreign-born archbishop since the 12th century, and the first female archbishop.

Jackelén was ordained a priest in the Church of Sweden in 1980 and became Doctor of Theology at Lund University in 1999. Previously she was Bishop of Lund from 2007 to 2014.

== Biography ==
Jackelén was born 4 June 1955 in Herdecke, West Germany. She studied Lutheran theology at the University of Tübingen and Uppsala University.

Jackelén served as a priest in Tyresö parish in the Diocese of Stockholm 1981–1988, in Gårdstånga parish in the Diocese of Lund 1988–1994 and in the Cathedral parish of Lund 1995–1996. After finishing her doctorate, she worked at Lund University 1999–2001 and was assistant professor of Systematic Theology/Religion and Science at the Lutheran School of Theology at Chicago 2001–2003. From 2003 she was Associate Professor and Director of the Zygon Center for Religion and Science until 2007.

Jackelén was elected Bishop of Lund in 2006, and succeeded Christina Odenberg in 2007. Unlike Odenberg, Jackelén obliged clergy who did not recognize her ministry to attend an Eucharist at which she presided. Odenberg had been the first woman to become a bishop in the Church of Sweden, and Jackelén became the third. Jackelén was the first woman to be appointed as bishop after a popular vote in the diocese, the two former (Odenberg in 1997, and Caroline Krook, Bishop of Stockholm, in 1998) having both been appointed by the Swedish government before the separation of the Church of Sweden from the state in 2000. Jackelén was ordained Bishop of Lund by Anders Wejryd, Archbishop of Uppsala, in Uppsala Cathedral on 15 April 2007, and was received in her diocese through a service in Lund Cathedral on 21 April.

As her official motto, she chose Gud är större ("God is greater"), referring to a passage in the First Epistle of John (1 John 3.18–20) and this also became the title of her pastoral letter, published in 2011. For her coat of arms, she chose an oval shield design by Jan Raneke displaying triple oak leaves from her home town Herdecke's coat of arms with triple mantuan pilgrim's crosses, quartered with the flag of Scania symbolising her episcopal see of Lund. The oak leaves are also featured on the coat of arms of Blekinge which constitutes the easternmost part of the Diocese of Lund.

As Bishop of Lund, Jackelén was one of the assistant officiants during the state wedding of Victoria, Crown Princess of Sweden, and Daniel Westling, in 2010.

She has served as representative of the Church of Sweden on the Lutheran World Federation council.

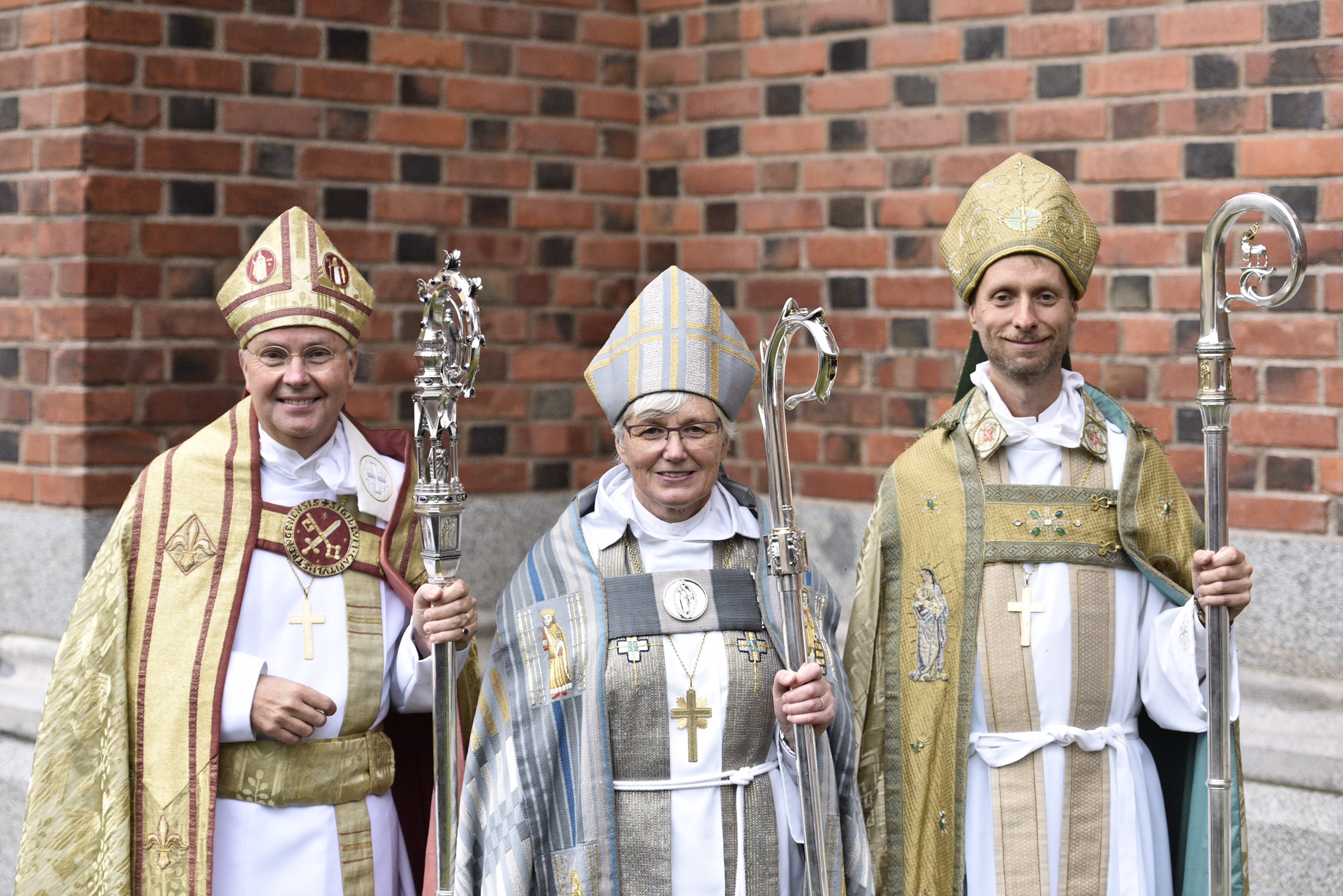
Jackelén (center) as Archbishop of Uppsala on 6 September 2015, with Johan Dalman, Bishop of Strängnäs (left), and Mikael Mogren, Bishop of Västerås (right)

She was elected Archbishop of Uppsala on 15 October 2013 and was officially received in Uppsala Cathedral on 15 June 2014, in the presence of Carl XVI Gustaf of Sweden and Queen Silvia of Sweden, after the retirement of Anders Wejryd. In March 2014, Johan Tyrberg was elected to succeed her as Bishop of Lund.

On Monday, 4 May 2015, she had an official audience with Pope Francis in Rome. This made her the first woman and archbishop to be welcomed at the Vatican. Her and the Pope's churches, while having very important and major differences (the stances on the state of ordination and the clergy, Marian beliefs, and their stances on some contemporary social issues, for example), did publish a document on the push toward theological dialogue and communion regarding the anniversary of the Protestant Reformation. She has several points of agreement, notably on evolution and the climate, the need for dialogue between science and religion, and the need to care for the poor, and to support some continued role for the Churches in public life, even in secularized societies which tend to want to separate the two.

She once again met Pope Francis when he visited Sweden during the turn of the 2016 October–November month switch, beginning the 500th anniversary of the Protestant Reformation.

On 7 December 2021, the Church of Sweden announced that she would retire. She laid down her bishop's staff during a church service inside the Uppsala Cathedral on 30 October 2022.

== Publications ==
Her doctoral dissertation Zeit und Ewigkeit: die Frage der Zeit in Kirche, Naturwissenschaft und Theologie (Lund 1999) was later republished on Neukirchener Verlag under the same title in 2002. A Swedish translation came in 2000 and an English translation Time & eternity: the question of time in church, science, and theology was published in 2005. She was the speaker at the 2003 Goshen Conference on Religion and Science, a conference that features noted academics in the field of religion and science. The proceedings were published by Pandora Press.

== Private life ==
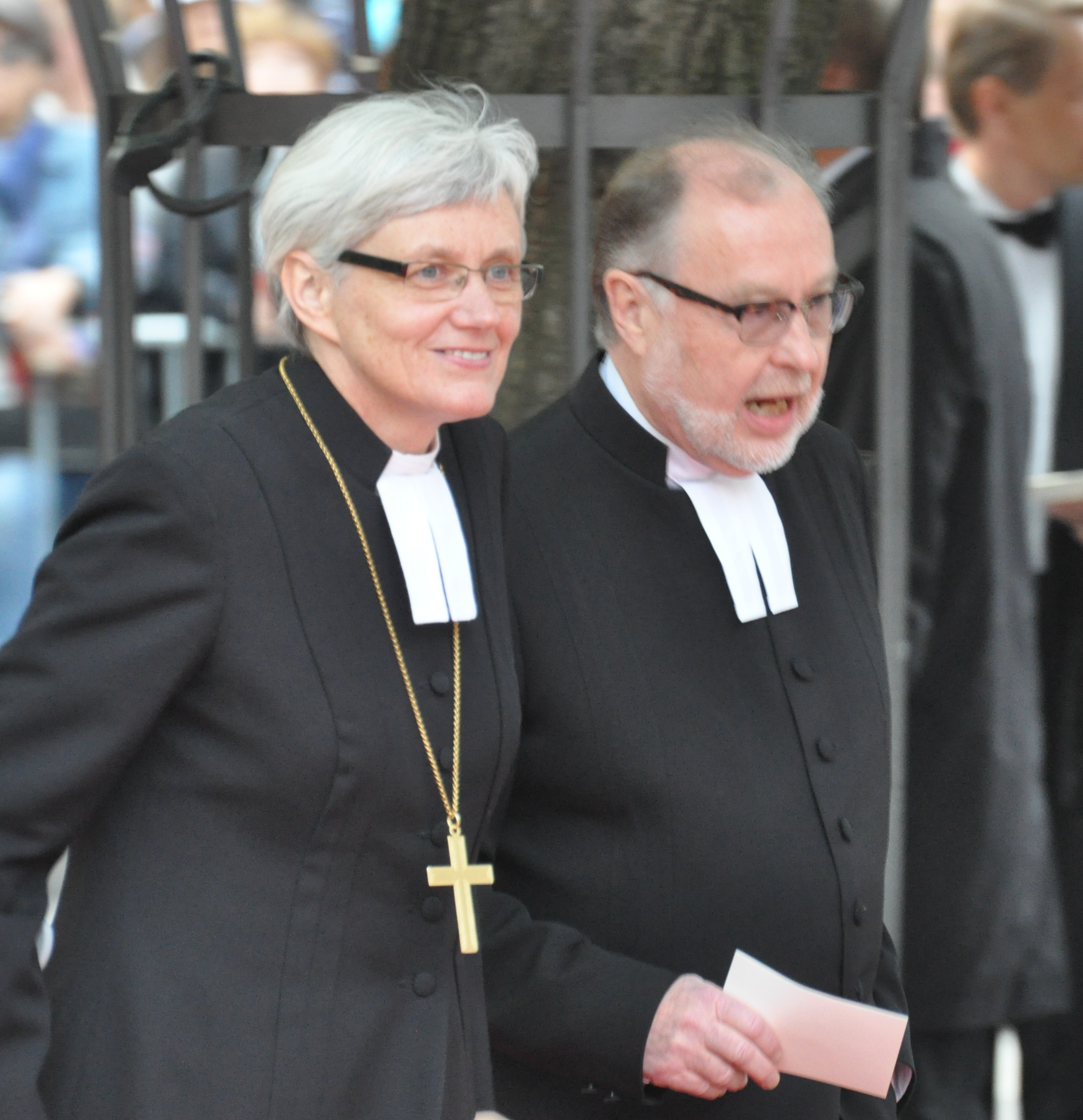
Antje and Heinz Jackelén during the royal wedding gala in 2010

Her husband, Heinz Jackelén, is a retired priest, also originally from Germany, and they have two daughters and several grandchildren. The couple met as undergraduate theology students at Uppsala University. The name Jackelén is believed to come from French-German Huguenot ancestors (Ja(c)quelin).

== Theological views ==
Jackelén has published several works which deal with the relationship between the natural sciences and religious faith, as well as the role of religion in modern society. She endorses the theory of evolution and sees no contradiction in believing both in God and in evolution.

Her election to archbishop sparked controversy when, during the election, she made statements about the virgin birth and the validity of Islam. In an interview with Swedish Christian newspaper Dagen, she stated that the virgin birth of Jesus is a "mythological term to explain the unique. Those who interpret the virgin birth as a biological issue have completely missed the point." She later clarified her statement as being intended to emphasise that in her view, neither a strictly literal interpretation of the virgin birth, nor a rejection of the virgin birth on the grounds of scientific impossibility, can capture the theological tradition surrounding the virgin birth.

Before the archbishop election Jackelén was asked the question "Does Jesus give a better picture of God than Muhammed?", to which she answered "To me it is obvious that Christians, Muslims and Jews worship the same God". For this she was both criticized and praised within the church.

She supports same-sex marriage in church, while calling for the state to support the institution of marriage as such.

== Political positions ==
Jackelén has spoken out against a ban on school graduation ceremonies in churches, believing a total ban on religious influences in public schools to be detrimental to the spiritual development of children, while emphasising the role of the Church of Sweden in Swedish civil society.

Together with the bishops' conference she has also addressed climate change in a Bishops' letter in 2014 and again 2019, calling for the members of the Church of Sweden as well as the Swedish state to set goals to reduce greenhouse gas emissions and for Sweden to enter binding international agreements on the issue. In the revised version 2019 she and the bishops stressed the importance of meeting the goals in the Paris Agreement She sees a role for the Church in the existential and spiritual parts of the climate debate, such as eco-anxiety. She is a vocal supporter of Greta Thunberg and has called her prophetic.

== Honours ==
In June 2017, Jackelén was awarded The Lambeth Cross for Ecumenism by the Archbishop of Canterbury "For her services to ecumenism - especially her leadership in addressing human, theological and social issues in partnership and dialogue".

== Notes ==
Titles in Lutheranism
Preceded by Christina Odenberg	Bishop of Lund; 2007–2014	Succeeded by Johan Tyrberg
Preceded by Anders Wejryd	Archbishop of Uppsala; Lutheran Primate of Sweden; 2014–2022	Succeeded by Martin Modéus
