= Diocese of Lund =

Church of Sweden diocese

Diocese of Lund Diocesis Lundensis Lunds stift
- Arms of the diocese of Lund. It shows a gridiron in remembrance of the martyrdom of Saint Lawrence, the patron saint of Lund Cathedral.

- Flag

Location
- Deaneries: 18 kontrakt
- Coordinates: 55°42′15″N 13°11′37″E

Statistics
- Parishes: 155
- Congregations: 189

Information
- Denomination: Church of Sweden
- Established: around 1050
- Cathedral: Lund Cathedral

Current leadership
- Bishop: Johan Tyrberg

Map

Website
- www.svenskakyrkan.se/lundsstift

Archdiocese of Lund Archidioecesis Lundensis Lund ærkebispedømme
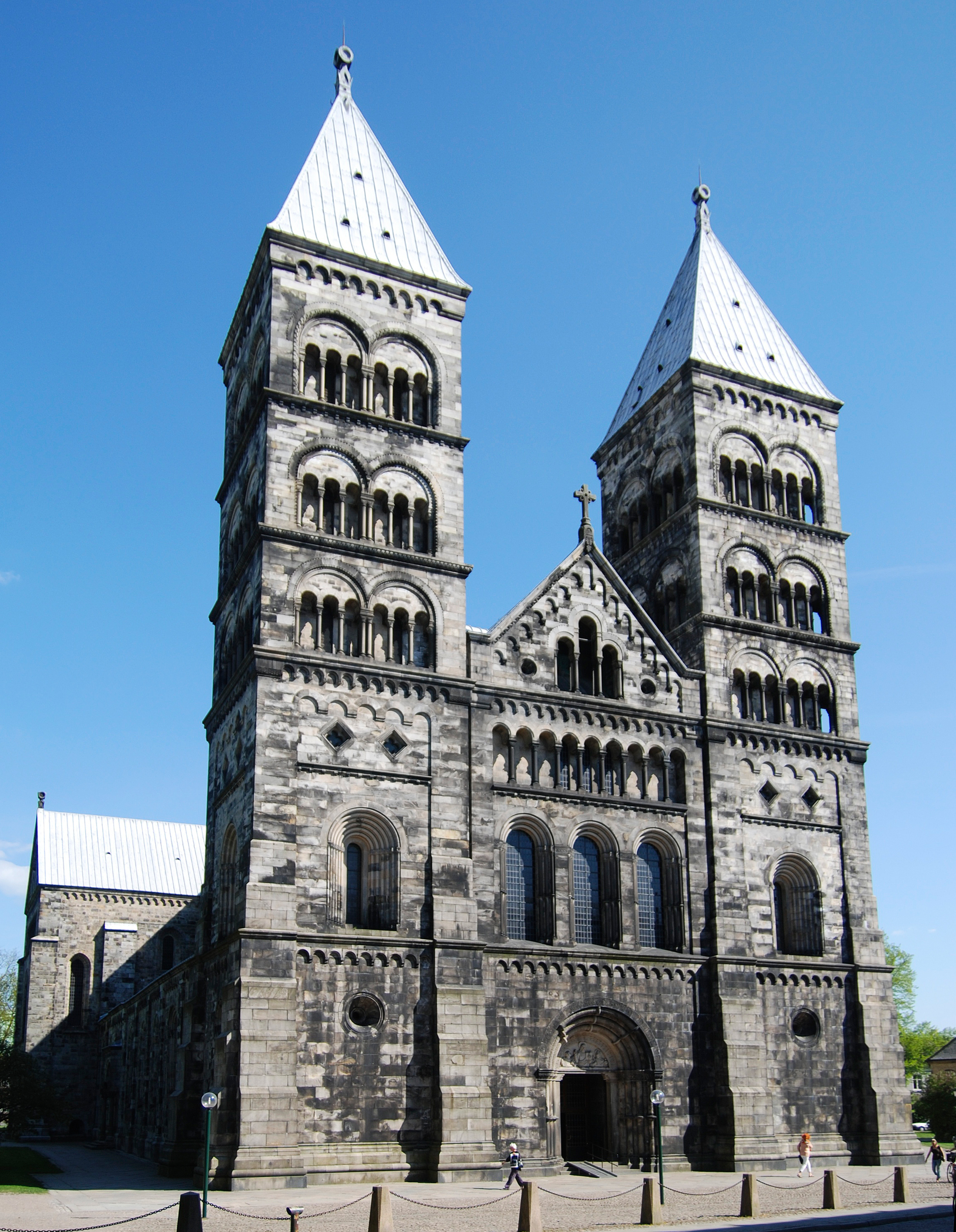
- Lund Cathedral, the seat of the Archbishop of Lund.

Location
- Country: Denmark (present-day Sweden)
- Ecclesiastical province: Lund

Information
- Denomination: Roman Catholic
- Sui iuris church: Latin Church
- Rite: Roman Rite
- Established: 1048 (As Diocese of Lund); 1103 (As Archdiocese of Lund)
- Dissolved: 1536
- Cathedral: Lund Cathedral

The Diocese of Lund (Swedish: Lunds stift) is a diocese within the Church of Sweden which corresponds to the provinces of Blekinge and Skåne. There are 217 parishes within the diocese, the most significant number in any of the dioceses of the Church of Sweden. The present bishop of Lund, Johan Tyrberg, succeeded Antje Jackelén in 2014.

The diocese was originally established in 1060 as a Roman Catholic diocese within the Kingdom of Denmark. Beginning in 1104, it had jurisdiction over ecclesiastical affairs in Denmark, Norway, and Sweden as the Archdiocese of Lund. Following the Danish Reformation, it became a diocese in the Lutheran Church of Denmark. Since the signing of the treaty of Roskilde in 1658 it has been the southernmost diocese in the Lutheran Church of Sweden.

== History ==
=== Catholic diocese ===
The Roman Catholic Diocese of Lund was formed in 1060, in what was then Danish territory, by separation from the Diocese of Roskilde, then both suffragans of the German Archdiocese of Hamburg-Bremen. Initially, only the provinces of north-western Skåne and Halland were under its jurisdiction. The two other Scanian Provinces, Blekinge and Bornholm, were instead under the jurisdiction of the nearby Diocese of Dalby. At the earliest in 1067, the Dalby diocese was merged with the Lund diocese.

In 1104, the diocese became the Metropolitan Archdiocese of Lund with its own ecclesiastical province, initially covering Denmark, Norway and Sweden. Norway got its own Archbishop of Nidaros in 1152, and Sweden its Archbishop of Uppsala in 1164. However, the Swedish archbishop remained for a long time nominally subordinate to the Archbishop of Lund.

The Diocese of Reval was created in 1240 for the Danish Duchy of Estonia, centred around Reval (modern Tallinn). For a short time, it remained subjugated to the Archdiocese of Lund even after Denmark sold its territories in Estonia to the Livonian Order in 1346 while other dioceses of Medieval Livonia were subjugated to the Archdiocese of Riga. The diocese was finally transferred to the Archdiocese of Riga in 1374.

=== Protestant era ===
During the Danish Reformation in 1536, the infrastructure of the Catholic church within the Kingdom of Denmark was seized by the crown and reinstated into the Church of Denmark. The office of archbishop was abolished in Denmark, and the Lutheran Diocese of Lund was demoted to an ordinary diocese. Initially, the bishops were styled superintendents.

After the Treaty of Roskilde in 1658, Scania came under Swedish rule and the diocese was integrated into the Church of Sweden, subordinate to the Archbishop of Uppsala. The Scanian Provinces had been ceded to Sweden, though Bornholm was permanently restored to Denmark in 1660.

The Catholic church became highly suppressed within Scandinavia during the reformation. The majority of the Nordic region was then administered by the Apostolic Vicariate of Nordic Missions, which had little fixed presence. In 1783, the Apostolic Prefecture of Sweden was formed later becoming the Apostolic Vicariate of Sweden. In 1953, the Vicariate was promoted to the Roman Catholic Diocese of Stockholm which has jurisdiction over the whole of Sweden.

== See also ==
- List of bishops of Lund
- Lund Cathedral

== Sources and external links ==
- Official website
- article Lunds stift from Nordisk Familjebok, in Swedish
- Herbermann, Charles, ed. (1913). "Lund" . Catholic Encyclopedia. New York: Robert Appleton Company.
- GCatholic with incumbent bio links
