= Church of Sweden =

Evangelical Lutheran church

Coordinates: 59°51′35″N 17°37′50″E

- Svenska kyrkan
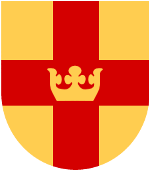
- Arms of the Church of Sweden with its centred crown, representing both the victory of Christ over death and the crown of Erik the Holy, Patron Saint of Sweden.
- Type: National church
- Classification: Protestant
- Orientation: Lutheran
- Scripture: Protestant Bible
- Theology: High church Lutheranism
- Polity: Episcopal
- Governance: General Synod
- Primate: Martin Modéus
- Associations: Lutheran World Federation; World Council of Churches; Conference of European Churches; Porvoo Communion
- Full communion: Philippine Independent Church; Union of Utrecht of the Old Catholic Churches; Episcopal Church (United States)
- Region: Sweden
- Headquarters: Uppsala, Sweden
- Founder: Ansgar (According to tradition); Stefan of Alvastra (First Archbishop of Uppsala, under the jurisdiction of the Roman Catholic Church); Gustav I of Sweden (Separated from the Holy See during the Swedish Reformation); Laurentius Petri Nericius (Consecrated as first Lutheran Archbishop of Uppsala in 1531. Author of the Swedish Church Ordinance of 1571)
- Origin: 1014, establishment of the first Swedish diocese, the Diocese of Skara 1164, establishment of the Archdiocese of Uppsala 1536, separation from Rome through the abolition of Canon Law 1593, adoption of the Augsburg Confession
- Separated from: Roman Catholic Church (1536)
- Separations: Evangelical Lutheran Church of Finland (1809); The Mission Province (2003)
- Congregations: 1,288 in Sweden, 31 abroad (2023)
- Members: 5,365,542 (2025)
- Official website: svenskakyrkan.se
- Logo

The Church of Sweden (Swedish: Svenska kyrkan) is an Evangelical Lutheran church in Sweden. A former state church, it is a national church which covers the whole nation.

Headquartered in Uppsala, it is the largest Christian denomination in Sweden. A member of the Porvoo Communion, the church professes Lutheranism. It is composed of thirteen dioceses, divided into parishes. The Primate of the Church of Sweden, as well as the Metropolitan of all Sweden, is the Archbishop of Uppsala.

It is liturgically and theologically "high church", having retained priests, vestments, and the Mass during the Swedish Reformation. In common with other Evangelical Lutheran churches (particularly in the Nordic and Baltic states), the Church of Sweden maintains the historical episcopate and claims apostolic succession. Some Lutheran churches have congregational polity or modified episcopal polity without apostolic succession, but the historic episcopate was maintained in Sweden and some of the other Lutheran churches of the Porvoo Communion. The canons of the Church of Sweden states that the faith, confession and teachings of the Church of Sweden are understood as an expression of the catholic Christian faith. It further states that this does not serve to create a new, confessionally peculiar interpretation, but concerns the apostolic faith as carried down through the traditions of the church, as the Lutheran Reformation aimed at conserving the faith and traditions of the Church while removing what it saw as medieval innovations.

It was Sweden's state church until 2000. At the end of 2025, its registered membership of 5,365,542 included 50.7% of the Swedish population. This high membership is due largely to automatic membership, through 1995, for any newborn child of a church member whose membership was not rejected. Approximately 2% of the church's members attended regularly in 2010, when the membership was higher. A total of about 4% of the members were in attendance in a given week at that time.

== Theology ==
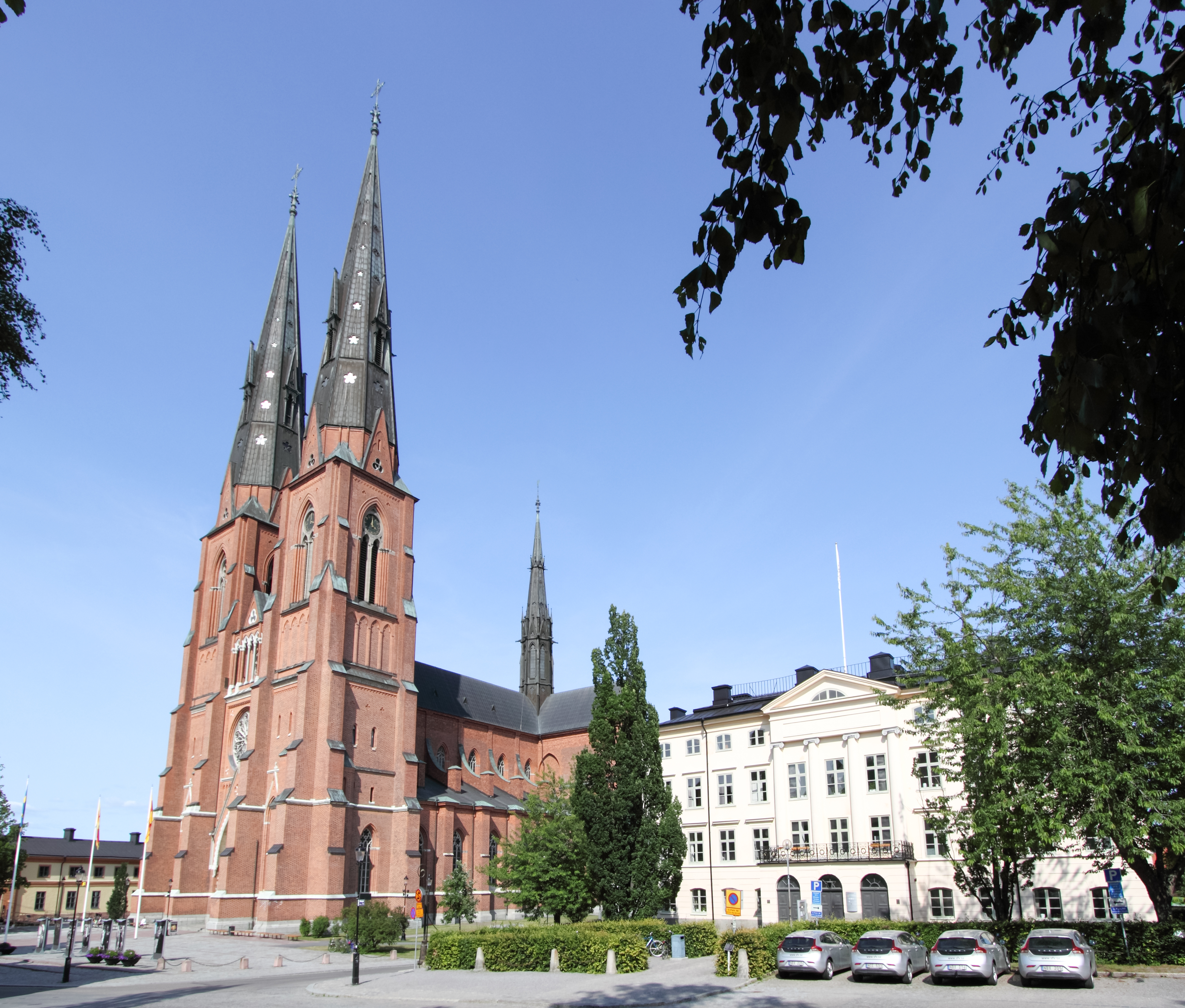
Uppsala, with its large cathedral, remains the seat of the Church of Sweden.

King Gustav Vasa instigated the Church of Sweden in 1536 during his reign as King of Sweden. This act separated the church from the Catholic Church and its canon law. In 1571, the Swedish Church Ordinance became the first Swedish church order following the Reformation.

The Church of Sweden became Lutheran at the Uppsala Synod in 1593 when it adopted the Augsburg Confession to which most Lutherans adhere. At this synod, it was decided that the church would retain the three original Christian creeds: the Apostolic, the Athanasian, and the Nicene.

In 1686, the Riksdag of the Estates adopted the Book of Concord, although only certain parts, labelled Confessio fidei, were considered binding, and the other texts merely explanatory. Confessio fidei included the three aforementioned Creeds, the Augsburg Confession and two Uppsala Synod decisions from 1572 and 1593.

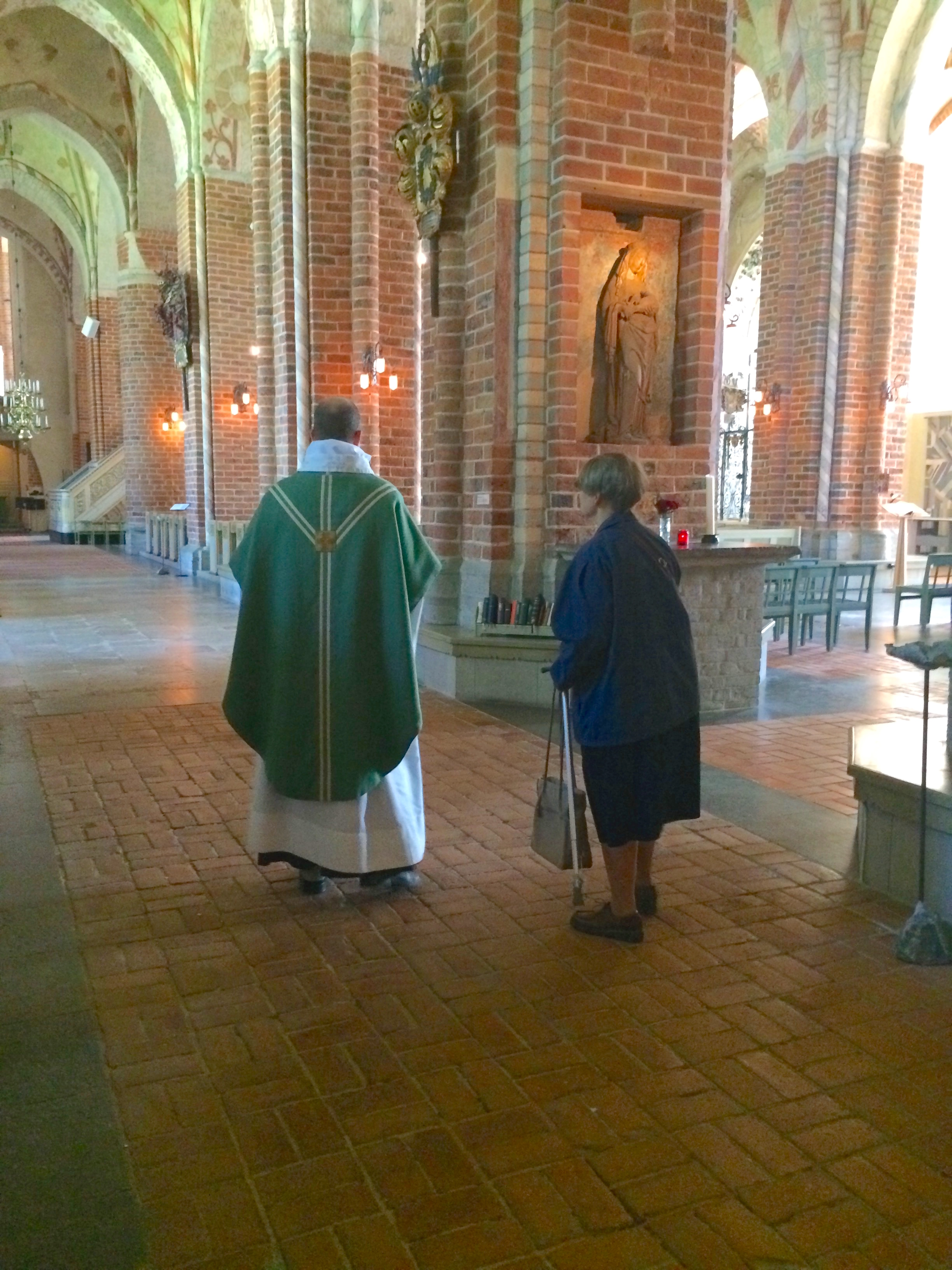
Preparing for the celebration of mass in Strängnäs Cathedral, Church of Sweden

During the 19th and 20th centuries, a variety of teachings were officially approved, mostly directed towards ecumenism:

- the 1878 development of the Catechism
- the Uppsala Creed of 1909, preparing for Eucharistic communion with the Church of England
- the constitutions of World Council of Churches (WCC)
- the constitutions of Lutheran World Federation (LWF)
- Church of Sweden's official response to the "Lima document"
- a Council of the Bishops Letter in Important Theological Questions
- the 1995 Treaty of Communion with the Philippine Independent Church

In practice, however, Lutheran creed texts play a minor role, and parishes instead rely on Lutheran tradition in conjunction with influences from other Christian denominations and diverse ecclesial movements, such as Low Church, High Church, Pietism ("Old Church"), and Laestadianism, which locally might be strongly established, but have little nationwide influence.

During the 20th century, the Church of Sweden oriented itself strongly towards liberal Christianity and human rights. In 1957, the General Synod rejected a proposal for the ordination of women, but a revised Church Ordinance bill proposal from the Riksdag in the spring of 1958, along with the fact that, at the time, clergy of the Church of Sweden were legally considered government employees, put pressure on the General Synod and the College of Bishops to accept the proposal, which passed by a synod vote of 69 to 29 and a collegiate vote of 6 to 5 respectively in the autumn of 1958. Since 1960, women have been ordained as priests, and in 1982, lawmakers removed a "conscience clause" allowing clergy members to refuse to cooperate with female colleagues. A proposal to perform same-sex weddings was approved on 22 October 2009 by 176 of 249 voting members of the Church of Sweden Synod. In response to the rise of theological liberalism in the denomination, traditionalist clergy and laity from the Church of Sweden established, in 2003, the Mission Province of the Church of Sweden, a nonterritorial ecclesiastical province that only ordains men to holy orders and does not perform same-sex marriages. The Mission Province (Missionsprovinsen) is a member of the International Lutheran Council, which represents Confessional Lutheran bodies around the globe.

In 2000, the Church of Sweden ceased to be the state church, but it maintains strong ties with communities, particularly in relation to rites of passage. There are many infants baptized and teenagers confirmed (currently 40% of all 14 year olds) for families even without formal church membership.

== History ==
=== Middle Ages ===
While some Swedish areas had Christian minorities in the 9th century, Sweden was, because of its geographical location in northernmost Europe, not Christianized until around AD 1000, around the same time as the other Nordic countries, when the Swedish King Olof was baptized. This left only a modest gap between the Christianization of Scandinavia and the Great Schism, however there are some Scandinavian/Swedish saints who are venerated eagerly by many Orthodox Christians, such as St. Olaf. However, Norse paganism and other pre-Christian religious systems survived in the territory of what is now Sweden later than that; for instance the important religious center known as the Temple at Uppsala at Gamla Uppsala was evidently still in use in the late 11th century, while there was little effort to introduce the Sámi of Lapland to Christianity until considerably after that.

The Christian church in Scandinavia was originally governed by the archdiocese of Bremen. In 1104, an archbishop for all Scandinavia was installed in Lund. Uppsala was made Sweden's archdiocese in 1164, and remains so today. The papal diplomat William of Modena attended a church meeting in Skänninge in March 1248, where the ties to the Catholic Church were strengthened.

The most cherished national Catholic saints were the 12th-century King Eric the Saint and the 14th-century visionary Bridget, but other regional heroes also had a local cult following, including Saint Botvid and Saint Eskil in Södermanland, Saint Helena of Skövde, and Saint Sigfrid in Småland. In their names, miracles were performed and churches were named.

=== Reformation ===
Shortly after seizing power in 1523, Gustav Vasa addressed the Pope in Rome with a request for the confirmation of Johannes Magnus as Archbishop of Sweden, in the place of Gustav Trolle who had been formally deposed and exiled by the Riksdag of the Estates.

Gustav promised to be an obedient son of the Church, if the pope would confirm the elections of his bishops. But the pope requested Trolle to be re-instated. King Gustav protested by promoting the Swedish reformers, the brothers Olaus and Laurentius Petri, and Laurentius Andreae. The king supported the printing of reformation texts, with the Petri brothers as the major instructors on the texts. In 1526, all Catholic printing presses were suppressed, and two-thirds of the Church's tithes were appropriated for the payment of the national debt. A final breach was made with the traditions of the old religion at the Riksdag called by the king at Västerås in 1544.

Other changes of the Reformation included the abolition of some Catholic rituals. However, the changes were not as drastic as in Germany; as in Germany, Swedish churches kept not only crosses and crucifixes, but also icons and the traditional liturgical vestments which in Germany were usually discarded in favor of the black preaching gown and stole used until recent times. Many holy days, based on saints' days, were not removed from the calendar until the late 18th century due to strong resistance from the population.

After the death of Gustav Vasa, Sweden was ruled by John III, who had Catholicizing tendencies, and then by his more openly Catholic son, Sigismund, who was also ruler of Catholic Poland. The latter was eventually deposed from the Swedish throne by his uncle, who acceded to the throne as Charles IX, and used the Lutheran church as an instrument in his power struggle against his nephew. He is known to have had Calvinist leanings.

The New Testament was translated into Swedish in 1526 and the entire Bible in 1541. Revised translations were published in 1618 and 1703. New official translations were adopted in 1917 and 2000. Many hymns were written by Swedish church reformers and several by Martin Luther were translated. A semi-official hymnal appeared in the 1640s. Official hymnals of the Church of Sweden (Swedish: Den svenska psalmboken) were adopted in 1695, 1819, 1937 and 1986. The last of these is ecumenical, and combines traditional hymns with songs from other Christian denominations, including Seventh-day Adventist, Baptist, Catholic, Mission Covenant, Methodist, Pentecostal, and the Salvation Army. In October 2013, the Church of Sweden elected Antje Jackelén as Sweden's first female archbishop.

=== Emigration aspects ===
In the 1800s–1900s, the Church of Sweden supported the Swedish government by opposing both emigration and preachers' efforts recommending sobriety (alcoholic beverages are sold in Sweden by a government monopoly). This escalated to a point where its ministers were even persecuted by the church for preaching sobriety, and the reactions of many congregation members to that contributed to the desire to leave the country (which, however, was against the law until 1840).

=== Coat of arms ===
Coat of arms of the Church of Sweden

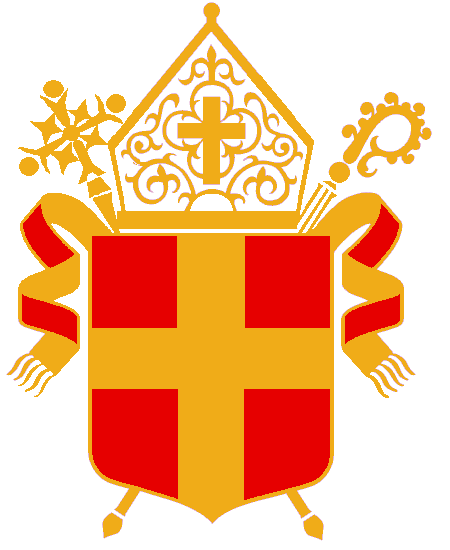
Coat of arms of the Archdiocese of Uppsala

The 19th century coat of arms is based on that of the Archdiocese of Uppsala. It is blazoned Or on a cross Gules an open crown of the field and thus features a gold/yellow field with a red cross on which there is a gold/yellow crown. The crown is called the victory crown of Christ, based on the royal crowns used in medieval times and corresponds in form to the crowns in the Swedish coat of arms and to that resting on the head of Saint Eric in the coat of arms of Stockholm.

== Membership statistics ==
Church of Sweden statistics
Year	Population	Church members	Percentage	Change in the Percentage (yearly avg.)
1972	8,146,000	7,754,784	95.2%	
1975	8,208,000	7,770,881	94.7%	0.2%▼
1980	8,278,000	7,690,636	92.9%	0.4% ▼
1985	8,358,000	7,629,763	91.5%	0.3% ▼
1990	8,573,000	7,630,350	89.0%	0.5% ▼
1995	8,837,000	7,601,194	86.0%	0.6% ▼
2000	8,880,000	7,360,825	82.9%	0.6% ▼
2005	9,048,000	6,967,498	77.0%	1.2% ▼
2010	9,415,570	6,589,769	70.0%	1.4% ▼
2015	9,850,452	6,225,091	63.2%	1.4% ▼
2020	10,379,295	5,728,748	55.2%	1.6% ▼
2021	10,452,326	5,628,067	53.9%	1.3% ▼
2022	10,536,649	5,555,385	52.9%	1% ▼
2023		5,484,992	52.1%	0.8% ▼
2024		5,426,053	51.4%	0.7% ▼
2025		5,365,542	50.7%	0.7% ▼

== Synodical structure ==
The Church adopted, at the time that it was still a state church, an administrative structure largely modelled after the state. Direct elections are held to the General Synod (Swedish: Kyrkomötet, The Church Assembly), and the diocesan and parish (Swedish: Församling) assemblies (and in some cases, confederation of parishes (Swedish: kyrklig samfällighet, 'church association') assemblies and directly elected parish councils). The electoral system is the same as used in the Swedish parliamentary or municipal elections (see Elections in Sweden). To vote in the Church general elections, one must be member of the Church of Sweden, at minimum 16 years of age, and nationally registered as living in Sweden.

The groups that take part in the elections are called nominating groups (Swedish: nomineringsgrupper). In some cases the nationwide political parties take part in the elections, such as the Social Democrats and the Centre Party. After the formal separation of Church of Sweden from the State of Sweden, the growing tendency in the elections is towards independent parties forming for candidature, either based on a political conviction, for example Folkpartister i Svenska kyrkan founded by Liberal People's Party members, or a pure church party such as the political independents' Partipolitiskt obundna i Svenska kyrkan (POSK) and Frimodig kyrka.

== Ordained ministry ==
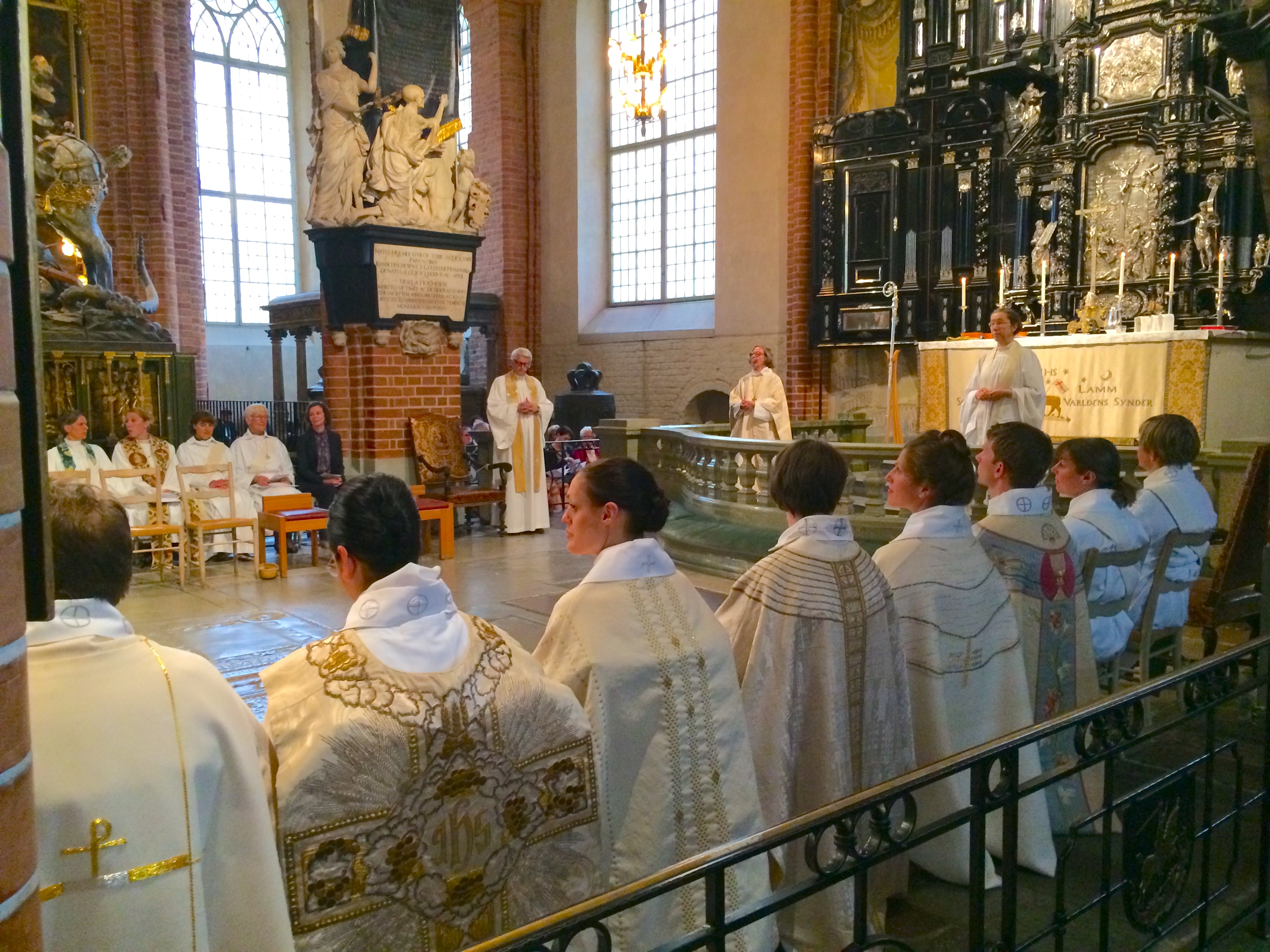
Sung Mass with the ordinations of two deacons and seven priests by the Bishop of Stockholm, in St Nicholas's Cathedral (Storkyrkan)

The Church of Sweden maintains the historic threefold ministry of bishops, priests, and deacons, and has approximately 5,000 ordained clergy in total.

It practices direct ordination, also called ordination per saltum (literally, ordination by a leap), in which candidates are directly ordained to the specific order of ministry for which they have trained. This is an alternative approach to the sequential ordination of other historic churches (including the Anglican, Orthodox, and Catholic churches) in which candidates must be ordained in the strict sequence of deacon, then priest, then bishop. A Church of Sweden priest can be ordained directly to that office, without any previous ordination as a deacon. All deacons of the Church of Sweden are, therefore, permanent deacons. The order of bishop is not entered through direct ordination, however, and a Church of Sweden bishop is required to be a validly ordained priest prior to their consecration; if a deacon or lay person were to be selected for the position, they would first be ordained as a priest.

After the Reformation, the Swedish Church seems to have practiced variously both direct ordination and sequential ordination. Although direct ordination was more widespread, and became normative, the practice of sequential ordination is attested in the seventeenth century Swedish Church. Bishop Johannes Rudbeckius (1619–1646) habitually ordained men to the diaconate in advance of ordaining them to the priesthood, and this was said by Archbishop Johannes Lenaeus of Uppsala (in 1653) to be usual Church of Sweden practice.

In the Evangelical Lutheran churches, including the Church of Sweden, ministerial function is indicated by the usual vestments of western tradition, including the stole, worn straight by bishops, crossed by priests (wearing the stole straight by priests is only permitted when in choir dress, i.e., a surplice rather than an alb, as no cincture is then used that would permit crossing the stole), and diagonally across the left shoulder by deacons. However, whereas in Roman Catholic or Anglican ordinations the candidates for priesthood will already be wearing the diagonal deacon's stole, in the Church of Sweden candidates for both diaconate and priesthood are unordained at the start of the service. Tiit Pädam of Uppsala University and a Swedish-based priest of the Estonian Evangelical Lutheran Church writes: "At the beginning of the [Evangelical Lutheran] ordination service, the candidates are dressed in white albs and no one wears a stole at the beginning of the rite. In this way the churches express a significant aspect of their understanding of ordination. The white alb, used both by the ordinands to the diaconate as well as to the priesthood, is a sign that the ordination is a new beginning, rooted in the priesthood of all the baptised."

The Church of Sweden employs full-time deacons to staff its extensive outreach and social welfare diakonia programme. Whilst deacons have the traditional liturgical role (and vesture) in the Swedish Church, their principal focus of work is outside the parish community, working in welfare roles. Nonetheless, deacons are attached to local parishes to be connected with church communities, and with a parish priest.

== Dioceses and bishops ==
Map of Swedish dioceses

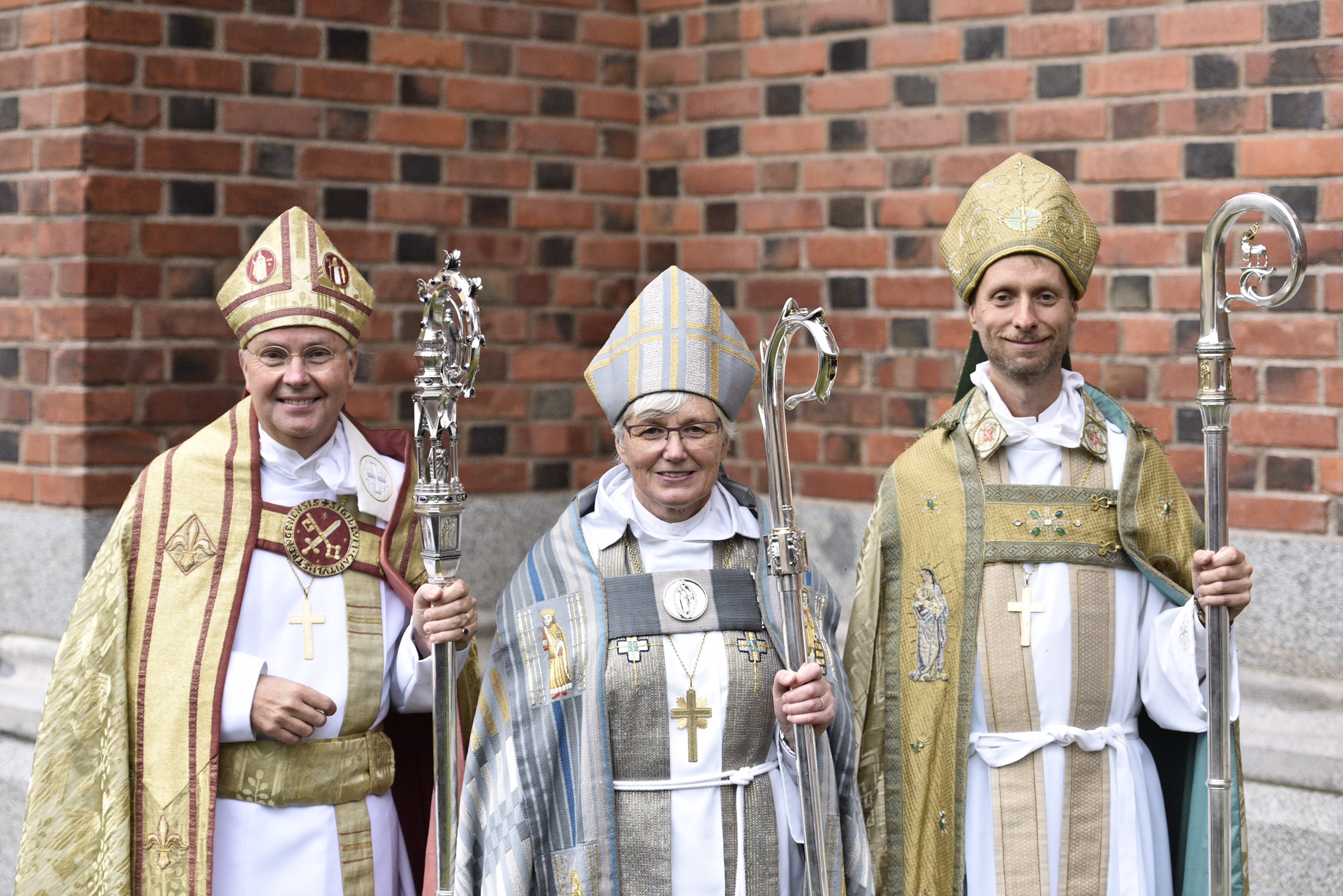
Antje Jackelén, former Archbishop of Uppsala (centre), with Johan Dalman, Bishop of Strängnäs (left), and Mikael Mogren, Bishop of Västerås (right)

The Church of Sweden is divided into thirteen dioceses (Swedish: stift), each with a bishop and cathedral chapter (Swedish: domkapitel). A bishop is elected by priests, deacons, and some laity in the diocese and is the chairman of the cathedral chapter. Priest and deacon members of a cathedral chapter are elected by priests and deacons in the diocese, while its lay members are selected by the stiftsfullmäktige, a body elected by church members.

A diocese is divided into "contracts" kontrakt (deaneries), each with a kontraktsprost (provost), as the leader. Deaneries with a diocesan cathedral are called domprosteri. Titular provosts can also sometimes be appointed, in Swedish called prost or titulärprost. The dean and head minister of a cathedral is called domprost, "cathedral dean" or "cathedral provost", and is a member of the cathedral chapter as its vice chairman.

At the parish level, a parish is called a församling. A more archaic term for a parish in Swedish is socken, which was used both in the registry and in the church administration. After the municipal reforms in 1862, the latter usage officially was replaced with församling, a term somewhat meaning 'congregation', originally and still used for the Lutheran territorial and nonterritorial congregations in cities and also for other religious congregations. One or several parishes are included in a pastorat with a head minister or vicar called a kyrkoherde (literally 'church shepherd') and sometimes other assistant priests called komminister (minister). At a cathedral an assistant minister is called a domkyrkosyssloman.

In addition to the 13 dioceses, the Church of Sweden Abroad (Swedish: Svenska kyrkan i utlandet – SKUT) maintains more than 40 overseas parishes. Originally a collection of overseas churches under the direction of a committee of the General Synod, SKUT was reorganised on 1 January 2012 with a quasi-diocesan structure. Under this reorganisation it gained a governing council, constituent seats on the General Synod of the Church of Sweden (like the 13 mainland dioceses), and for the first time, full-time deacons to provide a programme of social welfare alongside the work of priests and lay workers. However, SKUT does not have its own bishop, and is placed under the episcopal oversight of the Bishop of Visby.

Diocese	Diocesan coat of arms	Seat	Cathedral	Founded	Current bishop	Bishop's coat of arms
Archdiocese of Uppsala		Uppsala	Uppsala Cathedral	1123	Martin Modéus (Archbishop) Karin Johannesson (Bishop)	
Diocese of Skara		Skara	Skara Cathedral	1014	Åke Bonnier	
Diocese of Lund		Lund	Lund Cathedral	1048	Johan Tyrberg	
Diocese of Linköping		Linköping	Linköping Cathedral	1100	Marika Markovits	
Diocese of Strängnäs		Strängnäs	Strängnäs Cathedral	1129	Johan Dalman	
Diocese of Växjö		Växjö	Växjö Cathedral	1165	Fredrik Modéus	
Diocese of Västerås		Västerås	Västerås Cathedral	12th century	Mikael Mogren	
Diocese of Visby		Visby	Visby Cathedral	1572	Erik Eckerdal	
Diocese of Karlstad		Karlstad	Karlstad Cathedral	1581	Sören Dalevi	
Diocese of Gothenburg		Gothenburg	Gothenburg Cathedral	1620	Susanne Rappmann	
Diocese of Härnösand		Härnösand	Härnösand Cathedral	1647	Eva Nordung Byström	
Diocese of Luleå		Luleå	Luleå Cathedral	1904	Åsa Nyström	
Diocese of Stockholm		Stockholm	Stockholm Cathedral	1942	Andreas Holmberg	

The Diocese of Kalmar existed as a superintendentia from 1603 to 1678 and as a diocese between 1678 and 1915, at which time it was merged with the Diocese of Växjö. Another diocese which no longer exists is the Diocese of Mariestad, which existed as superintendentia between 1580 and 1646 and was replaced by the Diocese of Karlstad.

The dioceses of Uppsala, Strängnäs, Västerås, Skara, Linköping, Växjö, and the now-Finnish Diocese of Turku, are the original seven Swedish dioceses, dating from the Middle Ages. The rest have come into existence after that time and the Swedish reformation in the 16th century. The Diocese of Lund was founded in 1060, became an archdiocese in 1104, and lay in Denmark. The Province of Lund consisted of Denmark, Sweden, and Finland throughout the Middle Ages (originally also Norway and Iceland), although Uppsala had their own subordinate ecclesiastical province and archbishop from 1164.

When Eva Brunne was consecrated as Bishop of Stockholm in 2009, she became the first openly lesbian bishop in the world.

== Monasteries and convents ==
The Church of Sweden has several monastic communities.

- The Sisters of the Holy Paraclete (Helgeandssystrarna), who live in Alsike Convent.
- The Brothers of the Holy Cross (Heliga korsets brödraskap), Benedictine monks who live at the Östanbäck Monastery in Sala, Västmanland.
- The Sisters of St. Francis (Helige Franciskus systraskap), Franciscan nuns who live in Klaradals kloster in Sjövik.
- The Sisters of the Risen Saviour (Uppståndne frälsarens systraskap) who live in Överselö klostergård.
- The Daughters of Mary (Mariadöttrarna av Den Evangeliska Mariavägen) in Vallby.
- Linköpings kloster in Linköping, approved by the Bishop of Linköping in 2006, and inaugurated in 2014, a small contemplative and vegetarian convent, focused on climate issues; it has links with the Anglican Society of Saint Margaret.
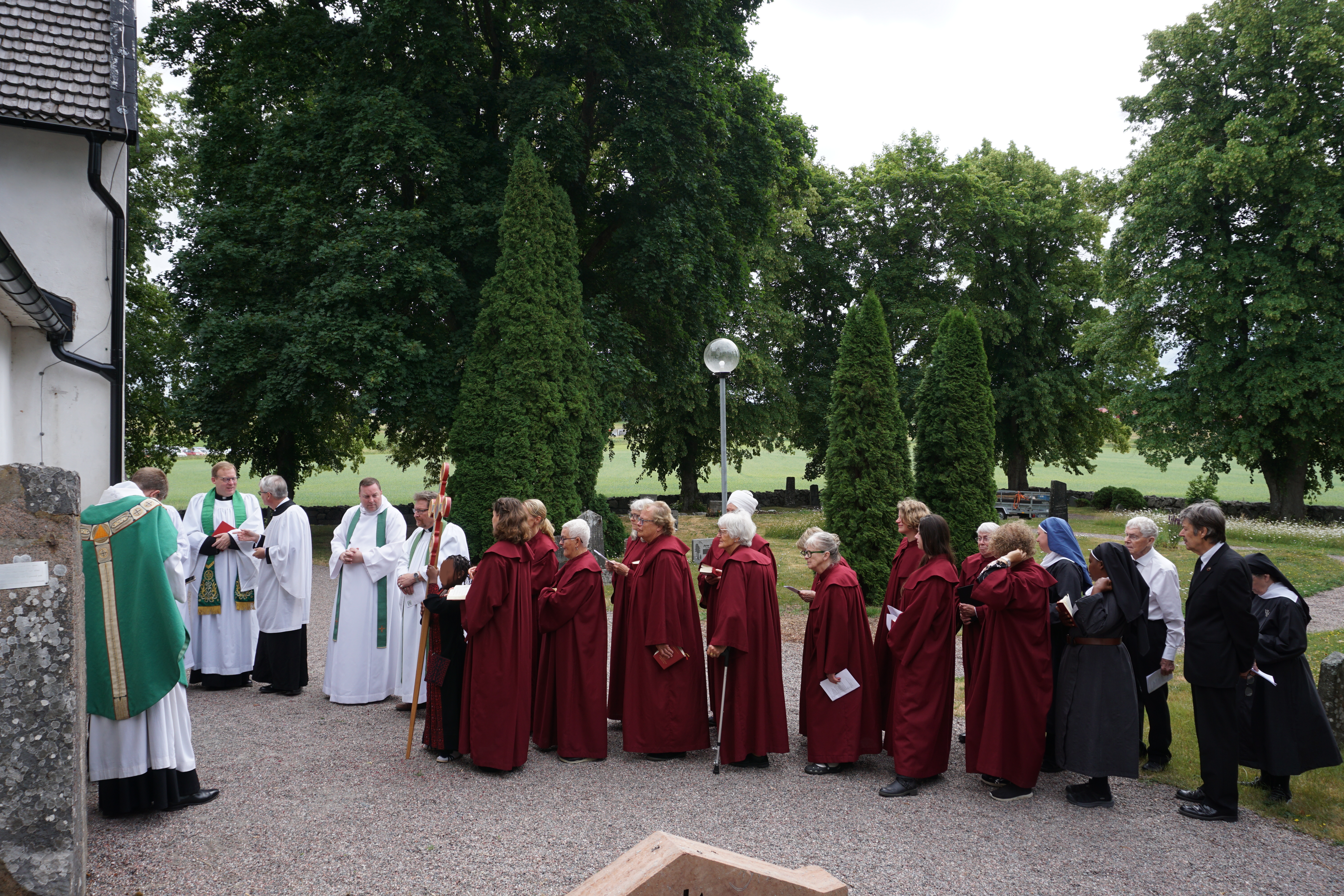
  The procession waiting to go inside for the Sunday mass and funeral of Sister Marianne, the first nun in the Church of Sweden since the reformation. At the end are nuns from Alsike Monastery.

== Partner churches ==
The Church of Sweden is a founding member of the Lutheran World Federation, formed in Lund, Sweden in 1947. Anders Nygren, later the Bishop of Lund, served as the first President of the Lutheran World Federation.

Since 1994, the Church of Sweden has been part of the Porvoo Communion, bringing it into full Communion with the Anglican churches of the British Isles and the Iberian Peninsula, together with the other Lutheran churches of the Nordic nations and the Baltic states. In 1995, full communion was achieved with the Philippine Independent Church. Since 2015, the Church of Sweden has also been in full communion with the Episcopal Church of the United States.

In 2016, the Church of Sweden reached full communion with the Old Catholic churches within the Union of Utrecht.

== Sámi relations ==
In 2021, the Church of Sweden apologized for its abuse of Sámi over several centuries, including forcible Christianization, the mistreatment of children in Sámi schools, and collecting the remains of Sámi people for research on scientific racism and eugenics. The Church of Sweden described their "dark actions" against the Sámi as "colonial" and "legitimized repression". Prior to apologizing, the Church of Sweden had produced a 1,100 page long document in 2019 compiling the church's history of oppressing Sámi people and erasing Sámi culture.

== See also ==
- Religion in Sweden
- Catholic Church in Sweden
- Archbishop of Uppsala
- Church of Sweden Abroad
- List of Lutheran dioceses and archdioceses
- Church of Sweden Parishes
- Swedish churches in London
- List of the largest Protestant bodies

=== Other Nordic national Lutheran churches ===
- Church of Denmark
- Church of the Faroe Islands
- Church of Iceland
- Church of Norway
- Evangelical Lutheran Church of Finland
