= 1 Corinthians 13 =

13th chapter of the First Epistle to the Corinthians

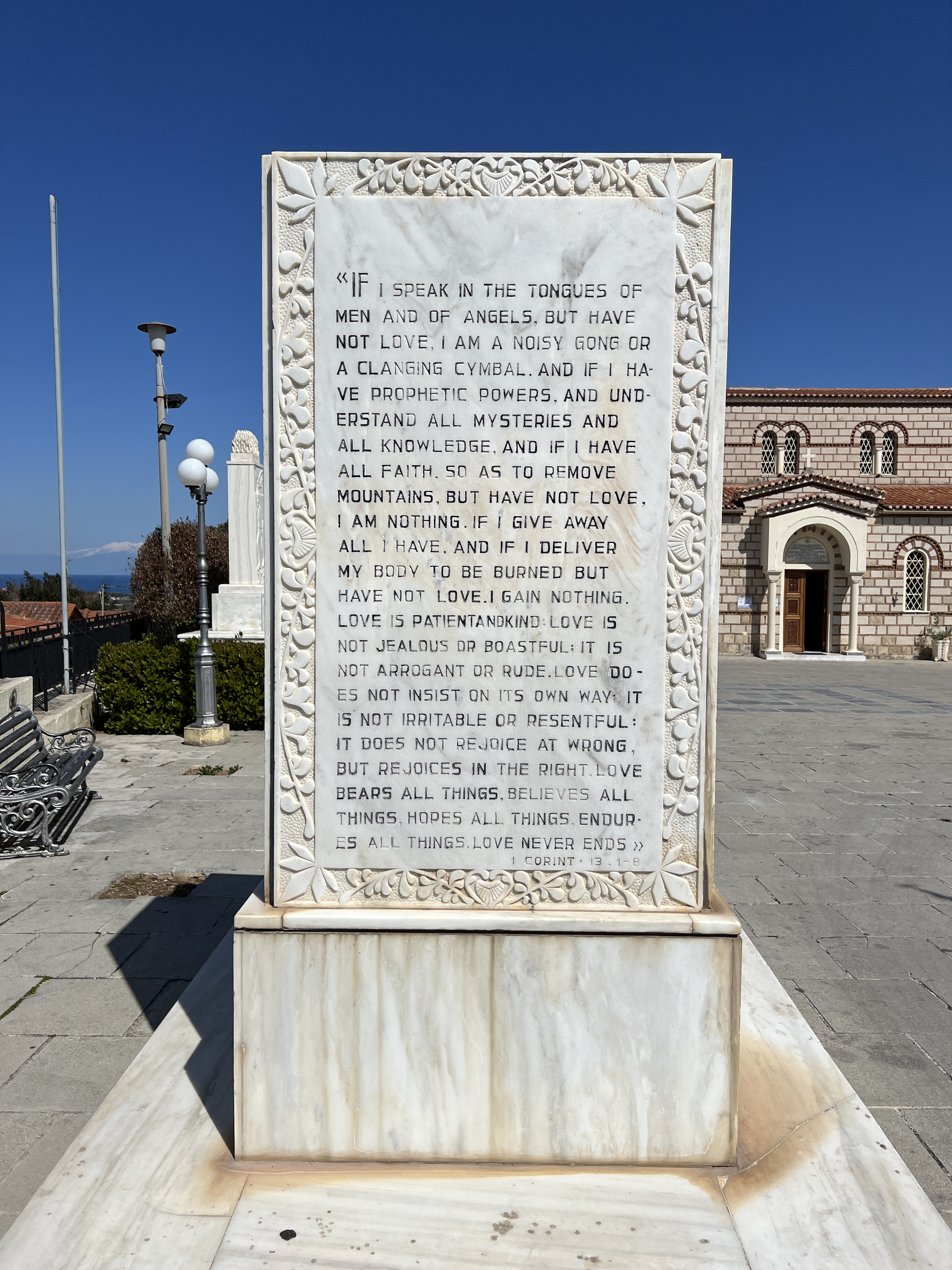
- A stele inscribed with 1 Corinthians 13 in Corinth, Greece.
- Book: First Epistle to the Corinthians
- Category: Pauline epistles
- Christian Bible part: New Testament
- Order in the Christian part: 7

1 Corinthians 13 is the thirteenth chapter of the First Epistle to the Corinthians in the New Testament of the Christian Bible. Authored by Paul the Apostle at Ephesus in the mid-50s AD, it is a sustained praise of love (ἀγάπη, agapē), the word rendered "charity" in the King James Version and "love" in most other English translations. The chapter stands at the centre of Paul's discussion of spiritual gifts in chapters 12 to 14: Paul argues that no gift, however impressive, has any value without love, and that love, unlike the gifts, will never end.

The chapter falls into three movements: without love the gifts are worthless (verses 1 to 3), love described in action (verses 4 to 7), and love outlasting the gifts (verses 8 to 13). Its closing verses contain two of the most familiar phrases of the English Bible: "For now we see through a glass, darkly" and "faith, hope, charity, these three; but the greatest of these is charity".

Often called the "love chapter" or the "hymn to love", it is among the most widely known passages of the New Testament, and has shaped Western ethics, Christian liturgy, and theological reflection on love, as well as a long history of use in literature, music and public life.

== Text ==
The original text was written in Koine Greek and is divided into 13 verses. The chapter division, applied in the Middle Ages, cuts across a longer unit: the bridge sentences at 1 Corinthians 12:31 ("I will show you a still more excellent way") and 1 Corinthians 14:1 ("Pursue love, and earnestly desire the spiritual gifts") frame the chapter and bind it to the discussion of spiritual gifts on either side.

The earliest surviving manuscripts containing the chapter are Papyrus 46 (c. AD 175–225), Codex Sinaiticus (330–360), Codex Vaticanus (325–350), Codex Alexandrinus (400–440) and Codex Ephraemi Rescriptus (c. 450).

The best-known textual variant in the chapter occurs in verse 3, where manuscripts divide between καυχήσωμαι (kauchēsōmai, "so that I may boast") and καυθήσομαι (kauthēsomai, "so that I may be burned"), a difference of a single letter. The oldest manuscripts, including Papyrus 46, Sinaiticus and Vaticanus, read "boast", the reading preferred by Bruce Metzger and modern commentators including Fee, Fitzmyer and Thiselton; other commentators, including Barrett, Bruce, Conzelmann and Collins, retain "be burned" as the reading that better fits Paul's escalating argument. Fee and Hays note that 1 Clement (55:2), written near the end of the first century, already echoes the verse.

The text reads:

^{1} If I speak with the languages of men and of angels, but don't have love, I have become sounding brass or a clanging cymbal. ^{2} If I have the gift of prophecy, and know all mysteries and all knowledge, and if I have all faith, so as to remove mountains, but don't have love, I am nothing. ^{3} If I give away all my goods to feed the poor, and if I give my body to be burned, but don't have love, it profits me nothing.

^{4} Love is patient and is kind. Love doesn't envy. Love doesn't brag, is not proud, ^{5} doesn't behave itself inappropriately, doesn't seek its own way, is not provoked, takes no account of evil; ^{6} doesn't rejoice in unrighteousness, but rejoices with the truth; ^{7} bears all things, believes all things, hopes all things, and endures all things.

^{8} Love never fails. But where there are prophecies, they will be done away with. Where there are various languages, they will cease. Where there is knowledge, it will be done away with. ^{9} For we know in part and we prophesy in part; ^{10} but when that which is complete has come, then that which is partial will be done away with. ^{11} When I was a child, I spoke as a child, I felt as a child, I thought as a child. Now that I have become a man, I have put away childish things. ^{12} For now we see in a mirror, dimly, but then face to face. Now I know in part, but then I will know fully, even as I was also fully known. ^{13} But now faith, hope, and love remain—these three. The greatest of these is love.

— 1 Corinthians 13, World English Bible

== Composition and context ==
Chapters 12 to 14 of the letter form a single discussion of spiritual gifts, prompted by disorder in the worship of the young church at Corinth, where dramatic gifts such as speaking in tongues had become marks of status. Within that discussion, chapter 13 supplies the standard by which the gifts are to be measured. C. K. Barrett writes that "love provides the scale by which other gifts may be tested and measured"; Joseph Fitzmyer calls the chapter not an aside but "the climax to what Paul has been teaching in chapter 12". Several of the qualities denied of love in verses 4 to 7 (envy, boasting, being "puffed up", self-seeking) correspond to faults Paul has rebuked in the Corinthians earlier in the letter, so that the chapter also gathers up the letter's argument to that point.

The chapter's elevated style has led readers since to speak of it as a "hymn to love", but most modern commentators decline the label. Barrett judges it "prose", whose "rhythmical patterns are not regular enough to warrant presentation in the form of poetry", while adding that "the balance of the sentences and the point and power of the vocabulary are seldom equalled by Paul, or indeed in Greek literature generally". Fee likewise argues that it is exalted prose rather than a hymn. A widely used alternative classification is the encomium, a formal composition in praise of a person or quality: Raymond Collins finds in it the classical encomium's four-part pattern of prologue, deeds, comparison and conclusion, and Fitzmyer calls it "a rhetorical encomium of love, intended as an exhortation". Ben Witherington III, drawing on classical rhetoric (Quintilian, Rhetorica ad Herennium) describes it as a deliberate set piece in the rhetoric of praise (epideictic rhetoric), a planned digression in the technical sense of that word: not a wandering from the subject, but a self-contained showpiece inserted to strengthen the surrounding deliberative argument. Anthony Thiselton declines to fix any single genre label, holding that "no single language function should obscure its multilayered character".

Praises of a supreme virtue or power were a recognized form in the ancient world, and commentators cite parallels including Plato's praise of Eros in the Symposium, the praise of truth in 1 Esdras 4, and the twenty-one attributes of wisdom in the Book of Wisdom 7:22–23, which Fitzmyer considers the closest parallel. Hans Conzelmann traced the chapter's style to the wisdom teaching of Hellenistic Judaism, observing that it nowhere explicitly mentions Christ. Whether Paul composed the chapter for this letter or adapted an earlier piece of his own is debated. Fee, Hays, Witherington and Blomberg regard it as composed for its present place, and Collins argues that "the entire chapter reflects Paul's way of argumentation, his vocabulary, and his ideas"; Thiselton, citing C. T. Craig, holds that "almost every word in the chapter has been chosen with this particular situation at Corinth in mind". Barrett, by contrast, thinks the polished passage "was probably inserted into 1 Corinthians as a ready-made piece", though written by Paul and intended by him to stand where it does, and Bruce allows that it may have been an earlier composition of Paul's own, quoting Arthur Darby Nock's description of it as "one of the most strikingly original things St Paul ever wrote". Occasional suggestions that the chapter is a later interpolation by another hand have found little acceptance.

Commentators from at least the 4th century (Chrysostom) commonly divide the chapter into three paragraphs: the necessity of love (verses 1 to 3), the character of love (verses 4 to 7), and the permanence of love (verses 8 to 13). Kenneth Bailey analyses it as a ring composition, a symmetrical pattern in which the opening and closing sections mirror each other and the emphasis falls at the centre, here on the description of love in verses 4 to 7.

== Summary ==
In the first three verses, Paul declares that the most exalted spiritual attainments are worthless without love. Speaking "in the tongues of men and of angels" without love is "a noisy gong or a clanging cymbal"; prophecy, understanding of "all mysteries and all knowledge", and faith sufficient "to remove mountains" amount, without love, to nothing; even giving away all one's possessions and surrendering one's own body gains nothing. (Note: Quotations in this section follow the English Standard Version: 1 Corinthians 13.)

Verses 4 to 7 describe love through a series of actions. Love is patient and kind; it does not envy or boast; it is not arrogant or rude; it does not insist on its own way; it is not irritable or resentful; it does not rejoice at wrongdoing, but rejoices with the truth. Love "bears all things, believes all things, hopes all things, endures all things".

The final movement, verses 8 to 13, contrasts love's permanence with the gifts' impermanence: "Love never ends", but prophecies, tongues and knowledge will pass away, for "we know in part and we prophesy in part, but when the perfect comes, the partial will pass away". Paul illustrates the contrast with a child who grows up and puts away childish things, and with the difference between seeing "in a mirror dimly" and seeing "face to face". The chapter closes: "So now faith, hope, and love abide, these three; but the greatest of these is love."

== Reception ==
The philosopher Simon May writing on the history of the idea of love, treats the chapter as the passage where, "for the first time in Western history, love is clearly named as ... the source of all other value... the fundamental principle of the moral universe" and as "the foundation stone" of a still-current Western belief that a life without love "is impoverished in a way for which no heroic deeds or original achievements can ever compensate". The historian Tom Holland agrees, observing that ranking of love above prophecy, knowledge and faith had no precedent in Greek and Roman ethics which preceded it in Western thought. He calls it "a formula for revolution", tracing its influence (alongside that of 1 John 4:7–12 and Matthew 5:43–47) through Augustine's dictum "love, and do as you will" and the civil-rights preaching of Martin Luther King, to the modern Western assumption of universal human dignity. Holland agrees with Nietzsche's own hostile account that the origin of the idea of human dignity lies in these passages: "not in the French Revolution, nor in the Declaration of Independence, nor in the Enlightenment, but in the Bible".

=== Early Church ===
The chapter appealed strongly to early Christian interpreters, who found in it both a portrait of Christian character and a statement about the limits of human knowledge of God. John Chrysostom devoted three homilies to it (Homilies 32 to 34 on First Corinthians, preached in the late fourth century), reading each clause of verses 4 to 7 as a remedy for a specific Corinthian vice. For Chrysostom love was greater than every gift and even than martyrdom, and open to every Christian equally: "it is not one, or two, or three gifts that I point out to you, but one way which leadeth to all these".

Verse 12, with its contrast between seeing "in a mirror dimly" and "face to face", became one of the most cited biblical texts in early Christian discussion of the beatific vision, the direct sight of God promised to the blessed. Augustine returned to the verse repeatedly, in The City of God and in his sermons, to describe the vision of God in the resurrection; Gregory of Nyssa read the "mirror" as the purified soul, in which the divine image can already be glimpsed. The verse was also turned to polemical use: Chrysostom cited "now I know in part" against the Eunomians, who claimed complete knowledge of God's essence.

The closing triad of verse 13 became the basis of the three theological virtues of faith, hope and charity in Christian moral theology. Augustine's sermons already state the classic reasoning: "Faith is succeeded by sight, hope by reality, but love has no successor." Bruce notes that the three were later joined to the four classical cardinal virtues to form the traditional seven virtues.

=== Liturgy ===
In the historic Western lectionary, 1 Corinthians 13 was the epistle for Quinquagesima, the last Sunday before Lent, a position it held both in the Roman Missal before 1970 and in the Book of Common Prayer of 1662, whose collect for the day ("...all our doings without charity are nothing worth: Send thy Holy Ghost, and pour into our hearts that most excellent gift of charity...") is itself built on the chapter. In the modern Revised Common Lectionary it is read on the Fourth Sunday after the Epiphany in Year C.

The chapter is one of the most frequently chosen readings at Christian weddings. It appears among the appointed New Testament readings in the Catholic Order of Celebrating Matrimony, and the Church of England describes it as the most popular reading at its weddings. Hays cautions that the wedding association can obscure Paul's original concern, which was the ordering of a divided congregation's common life rather than romantic love.

=== Music ===
The chapter has attracted composers across five centuries. Orlande de Lassus set verses 11 to 13 in "Cum essem parvulus" ("When I was a child", published 1582). Johannes Brahms closed his last song cycle, the Vier ernste Gesänge (Four Serious Songs, 1896), with verses 1 to 3 and 12 to 13, turning from the preceding songs' meditations on death to "faith, hope, love". Hal Hopson's 1972 hymn "The Gift of Love" ("Though I may speak with bravest fire"), a paraphrase of verses 1 to 3 set to the English folk melody "O Waly Waly", has been described by the hymnologist C. Michael Hawn as one of the most popular late twentieth-century hymns. In Krzysztof Kieślowski's film Three Colours: Blue (1993), Zbigniew Preisner's "Song for the Unification of Europe", which climaxes the film, sets the chapter's Greek text for soprano, chorus and orchestra.

=== Literature, film and public life ===
The rendering of verse 12 in the King James Version, "through a glass, darkly" (taken over from the 1560 Geneva Bible, which lacked the comma), has become a common English expression and has furnished the titles of many works. Ingmar Bergman's film Through a Glass Darkly (1961), the first of his trilogy on faith, won the Academy Award for Best Foreign Language Film; Philip K. Dick reworked the phrase for his novel A Scanner Darkly (1977), which quotes and meditates on the verse; and George S. Patton took it as the title of his poem "Through a Glass, Darkly", on his belief that he had lived past lives as a soldier. The chapter has repeatedly figured in American and British public life. Franklin D. Roosevelt took the oath of office at all four of his presidential inaugurations on his family's seventeenth-century Dutch Bible opened to 1 Corinthians 13. Prime Minister Tony Blair read the chapter at the funeral of Diana, Princess of Wales in Westminster Abbey in 1997. President Barack Obama adapted verse 11 in his first inaugural address in 2009: "in the words of Scripture, the time has come to set aside childish things".

=== Theology ===
The chapter has remained a touchstone for Christian theology of love, and has been cited as a founding text in the wider history of Western ethical thought. Anders Nygren's influential study Agape and Eros (1930–1936) treated it as a central text for his distinction between agapē, the spontaneous and unmotivated love of God, and egocentric human erōs. Karl Barth structured his account of Christian love in the Church Dogmatics around the chapter, summarizing its three movements as "it is love alone that counts, love alone that triumphs, and love alone that endures", a formula later commentators have adopted as section headings.

In Roman Catholic teaching, the Catechism of the Catholic Church cites or quotes the chapter fifteen times. Pope Benedict XVI's encyclical Deus caritas est (2005) calls the chapter "the Magna Carta of all ecclesial service", and Pope Francis's apostolic exhortation Amoris laetitia (2016) devotes the heart of its chapter on married love to a phrase-by-phrase commentary on verses 4 to 7.

== Analysis ==
=== Love and the spiritual gifts (verses 1–3) ===
Paul opens with three conditional sentences, each granting that a spiritual endowment has real value yet declaring it worthless when exercised without love. Fitzmyer traces the descending force of the three conclusions: without love "I produce nothing of value", "I am of no value", "I gain nothing of any value". The sequence begins with speaking in tongues, Fee suggests, because that is where the Corinthian problem lay, and Thiselton, following D. A. Carson, notes that the shock of verse 1 is that it is not the gift but the speaker himself who becomes the noise: "It is not the gift of tongues that is only a resounding gong ... but I, myself." The reference to "tongues of men and of angels" reflects a contemporary belief in angelic heavenly language: Fee, Hays and Bruce cite the Testament of Job (48–50), in which Job's daughters speak in the dialect of angels, and Collins takes the phrase to describe the Corinthians' own understanding of tongues. Fitzmyer, by contrast, reads it as ironic rhetorical exaggeration : "No one knows what angelic language is, or even whether angels have tongues." The images of "sounding brass" and "clanging cymbal" have been explained in two main ways. Fee, Hays and Barrett associate them with the ecstatic rites of pagan cults such as that of Cybele; on Barrett's reading, a church with tongues but without love "is mere paganism". Because χαλκός ("bronze") is not otherwise used of a musical instrument, several recent commentators, including Fitzmyer, Collins and Thiselton, instead take it as one of the bronze acoustic jars that amplified voices in Greek theatres, an image Corinth's famous bronze industry would have made vivid: an empty vessel that resonates with sound not its own. Bailey relates the same imagery to the din of a Corinthian bronze market.

=== The character of love (verses 4–7) ===
Love is described through a chain of verbs, fifteen in Fee's count, and commentators stress that Paul describes conduct rather than feeling: for Paul, Fee writes, "to love is to act". Thiselton translates them as "Love waits patiently; love shows kindness ... does not keep a reckoning up of evil ... It never tires of support, never loses faith, never exhausts hope, never gives up." Several of the qualities denied of love correspond to Corinthian faults named earlier in the letter, among them jealousy, boasting and being "puffed up" (φυσιόω, physioō, a verb used in this letter only of the Corinthians). Fitzmyer notes that the verb rendered "is kind" (χρηστεύεται, chrēsteuetai) occurs only here in the Greek Bible. Witherington, drawing on Chrysostom, reads each clause as an antidote to a specific Corinthian vice, and, following Margaret M. Mitchell, takes love as Paul's positive counterpart to Corinthian factionalism.

Individual verbs have drawn particular comment. Bailey glosses the opening μακροθυμεῖ (makrothymei, "is patient") as the patience of the strong who could retaliate but do not, and the "endures" of verse 7 as the patience of the weak who cannot change their suffering, the two words framing the description. The verb στέγει (stegei) in verse 7 is variously rendered "bears", "puts up with" (Fee), "supports" (Barrett) or, following its use for a watertight vessel, "keeps all confidences" (Bailey). On "keeps no record of wrongs", Barrett connects the bookkeeping verb λογίζεται (logizetai, "reckons") with Paul's language of justification: "What then does love do with evil? The final answer must be that it takes evil upon itself, and thus disposes of it."

Many interpreters observe that the portrait is one of a person. Bruce and Blomberg read it as a depiction of the character of Christ, Blomberg noting that one could substitute the name of Jesus for "love" throughout; Barrett writes that "the only human model he can have used is Jesus of Nazareth", and that the description is ultimately "a description of the love of God". Collins adds that the qualities listed are those "generally attributed to God", so that for Paul love "is neither a human virtue, nor is it simply one of the charisms".

=== The permanence of love (verses 8–13) ===
Fee argues that the weight of this paragraph falls not on the permanence of love as such but on the merely provisional character of the gifts: Paul "is not here condemning the gifts; he is relativizing them". "Love never fails" turns on the verb πίπτει (piptei, "falls"); Thiselton renders it "love never falls apart", and Barrett observes that the statement "can in truth be made only about God", whose love the Spirit reproduces in believers.

The clause "when the perfect comes" (verse 10, τὸ τέλειον, to teleion) is read by commentators across traditions as referring to the end of the age, the final state in which believers see God "face to face". Fee, Hays, Blomberg and Bruce identify it with the coming of Christ and the world to come; Barrett translates it "totality", "the whole truth about God", and insists it "remains an eschatological notion"; Collins calls it "clearly a reference to the eschaton"; and Fitzmyer writes that it "is scarcely related to the completion of the New Testament canon, as some have tried to take it; such an extraneous meaning is foreign to this context".

The canon interpretation Fitzmyer rejects arose within debates over cessationism, the view that miraculous gifts such as speaking in tongues and prophecy ceased in the church's early history: some writers in the tradition of B. B. Warfield identified "the perfect" with the completed New Testament, so that the gifts ceased when the last books were written. The reading has been rejected not only by the commentators above but within cessationism itself: Chrysostom already treated the extraordinary gifts as having ceased by his own day without appealing to this verse; Calvin referred the passage to death and the final judgment, remarking that "the whole of this discussion is ignorantly applied to the time that is intermediate"; and the modern cessationist writer John MacArthur likewise takes "the perfect" to be the eternal state rather than the canon. Thiselton concludes that the verses "should not be used as a polemic for either side" of the cessationist debate, since all that they make clear is that the gifts cease at the end of the age.

The analogy of the child (verse 11) is read by Fee as a contrast between two ages, the present and the age to come, rather than a remark about maturity; Bruce notes that the contrast between childhood and adulthood was a stock figure in Greco-Roman writing.

==== "Through a glass, darkly" (verse 12) ====
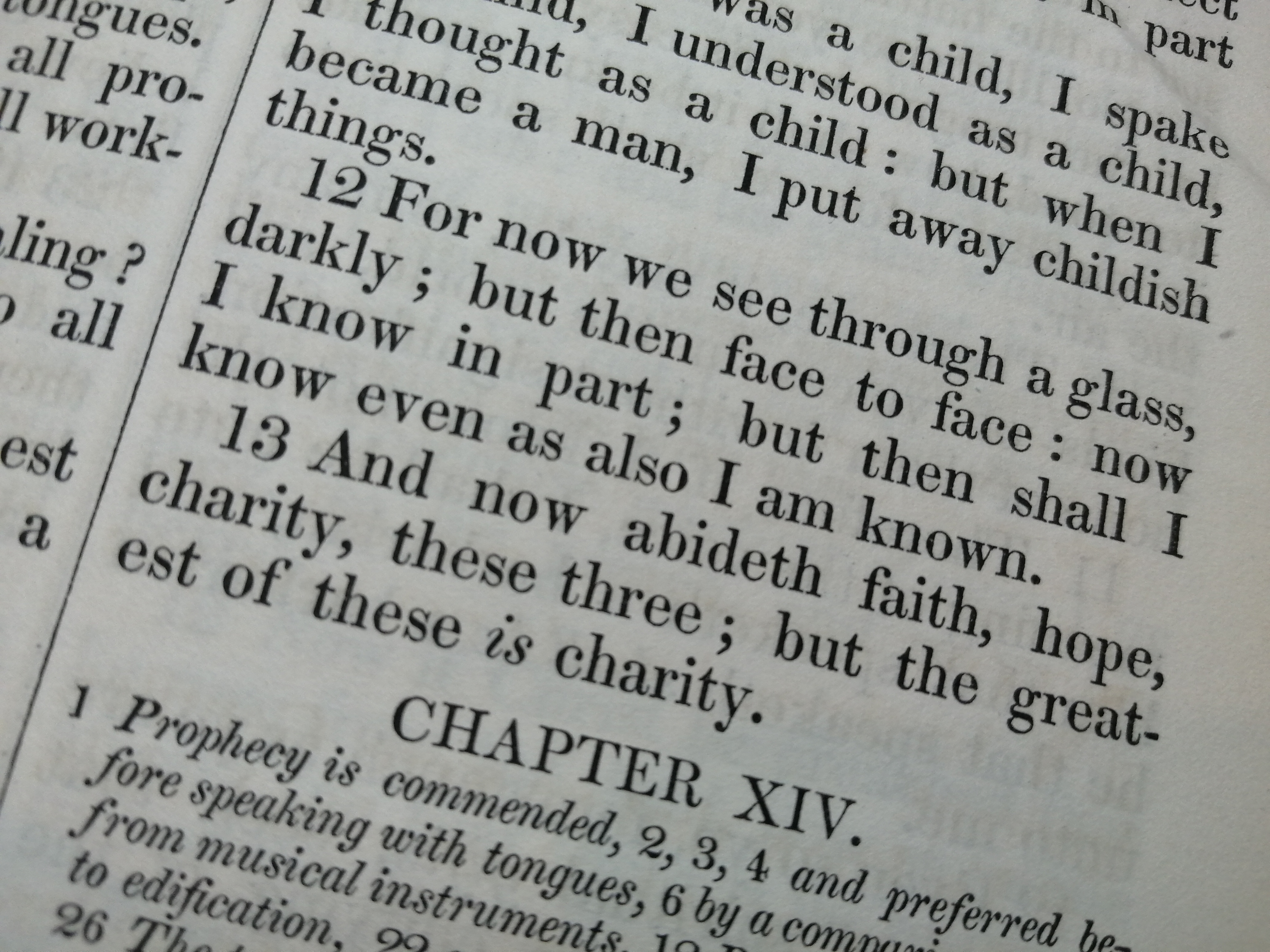
"Through a glass, darkly" in 1851 King James Version

Paul contrasts seeing "in a mirror dimly" (δι' ἐσόπτρου ἐν αἰνίγματι, di' esoptrou en ainigmati) with seeing "face to face". Ancient mirrors were of polished bronze, and Corinth was famous for producing them; Fee, Hays, Barrett and Thiselton all note the reference to local craftmanship. Most commentators hold that the point is not the poor quality of the reflection, since Corinthian mirrors were good by ancient standards, but its indirectness: as Fitzmyer puts it, "in a mirror, whether good or poor, one sees only a reflection or image of the thing, not the thing itself". The accompanying phrase ἐν αἰνίγματι (en ainigmati, "in a riddle", traditionally "darkly") echoes the Septuagint of Numbers 12:8, where God speaks to Moses "mouth to mouth ... and not in riddles". Later rabbinic literature developed the same image, contrasting the prophets, who saw God through a dim glass (aspaklaria), with Moses, who saw through a clear one.

Bailey observes that the chapter refers to a bronze object at three points, the cymbal of verse 1, the watertight vessel behind στέγει (stegei) in verse 7, and the mirror of verse 12, each evoking the bronze-working for which Corinth was known.

==== Faith, hope and love (verse 13) ====
The closing triad of faith, hope and love is, Fee and Bruce note, a traditional formula that Paul inherited rather than coined; Bruce cites A. M. Hunter to this effect. The three are said to "abide", and interpreters differ over the force of the adverb νυνί ("now"): Fee and Hays take it as temporal, so that the triad marks Christian life in the present age, whereas Bruce reads it as resumptive rather than temporal. Love is called the greatest because, on Fee's reading, it alone continues into eternity, faith and hope by their nature looking toward what is not yet possessed (cf. Romans 8:24); Hays adds that love will endure "when the love of God is all in all" (cf. 1 Corinthians 15:28), and Bruce that faith gives place to sight and hope to fulfilment while love remains unchanged. Bruce records that faith, hope and love were later joined to the four Platonic virtues to make up the traditional seven cardinal virtues.
