= Uddén =

Uddén or Udden is a surname. Notable people with the surname include:

- Åke Uddén (1903–1987), Swedish violist
- Cecilia Uddén (born 1960), Swedish journalist
- Jeremy Udden (born 1978), American musician
