= Elisabeth Ohlson Wallin =

Swedish photographer and artist (1961–2024)

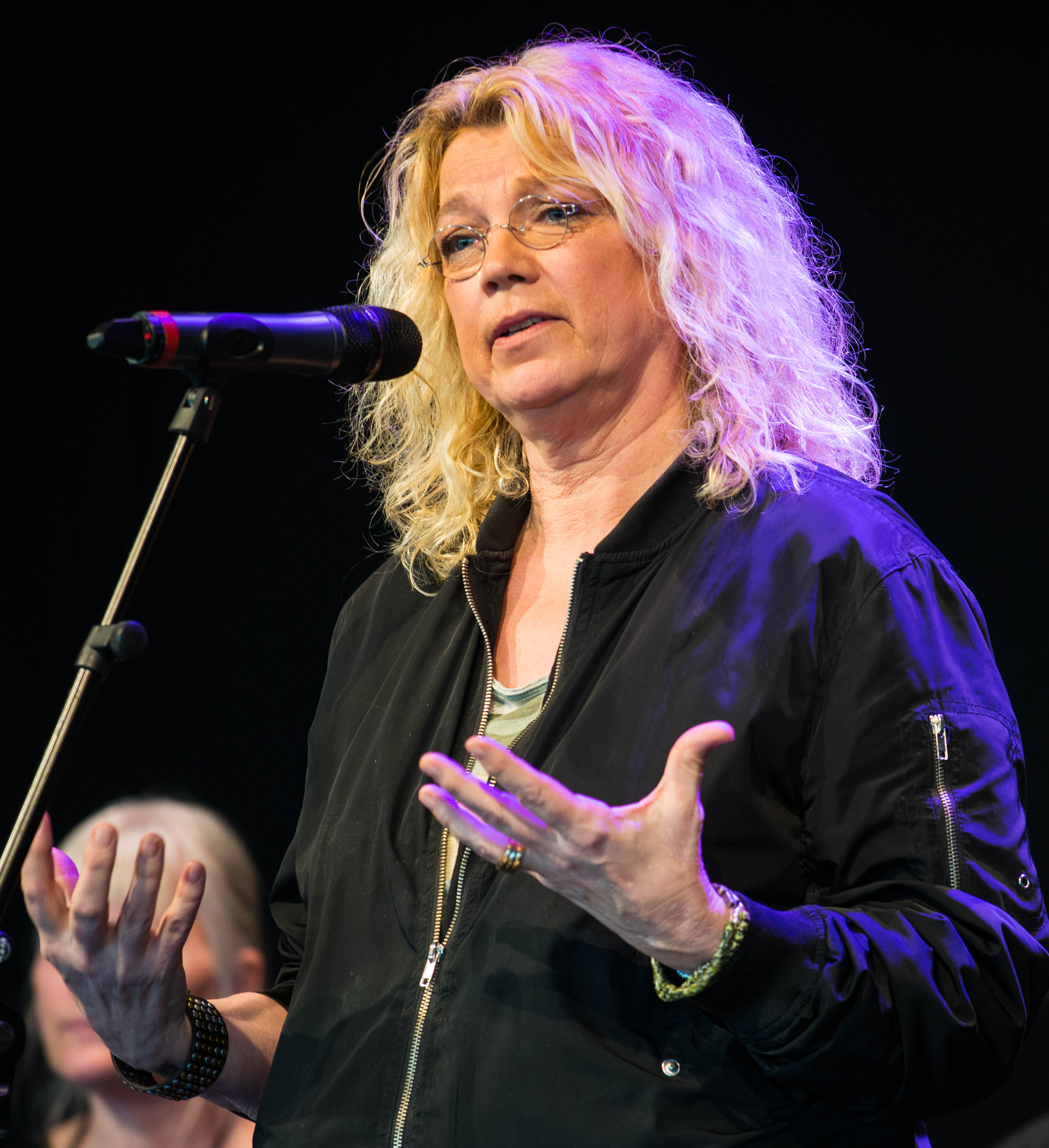
- Ohlson Wallin in 2015
- Born: 28 May 1961; Skara, Sweden
- Died: 30 October 2024 (aged 63)
- Citizenship: Swedish
- Occupations: Photographer, artist, theatre director
- Notable work: Ecce homo
- Spouse: Minna Strömberg Wallin
- Partner: Cecilia Uddén
- Awards: Ingemar Hedenius-priset (2009)
- Website: https://ohlson.se/

Elisabeth Ohlson (28 May 1961 – October 2024) was a Swedish photographer and artist. Her photographic work often represented LGBT people.

Ohlson, a lesbian, was most noted for her exhibition Ecce homo which portrayed Jesus among gay and transgender people. The scenes were modern versions of stories of the New Testament, such as Jesus riding a bicycle in a gay parade, paralleling the triumphal entry of Jesus riding into Jerusalem on a donkey. With this work, Ohlson wanted to remind people that Jesus worked with and helped the outcasts of society. She got the idea when one of her friends died of AIDS in the early 1990s.

The first Ecce Homo exhibition was held in Stockholm in 1998. Later an exhibition was held in Uppsala Cathedral that the archbishop K. G. Hammar had approved. Later Ecce Homo toured around the world. An Ecce Homo exhibition opened on 3 October 2012 in Belgrade, Serbia, then the only city in that part of Europe in which that exhibition was held. The exhibit had to be protected around the clock by security guards.

In 2009 Ohlson Wallin was awarded Ingemar Hedenius-priset.

Ohlson Wallin was diagnosed with inoperable stomach cancer in 2023. She died in October 2024, at the age of 63.
