= Per-Olov Ahrén =

Swedish clergyman

The Right Reverend Per-Olov Ahrén
- Bishop of Lund
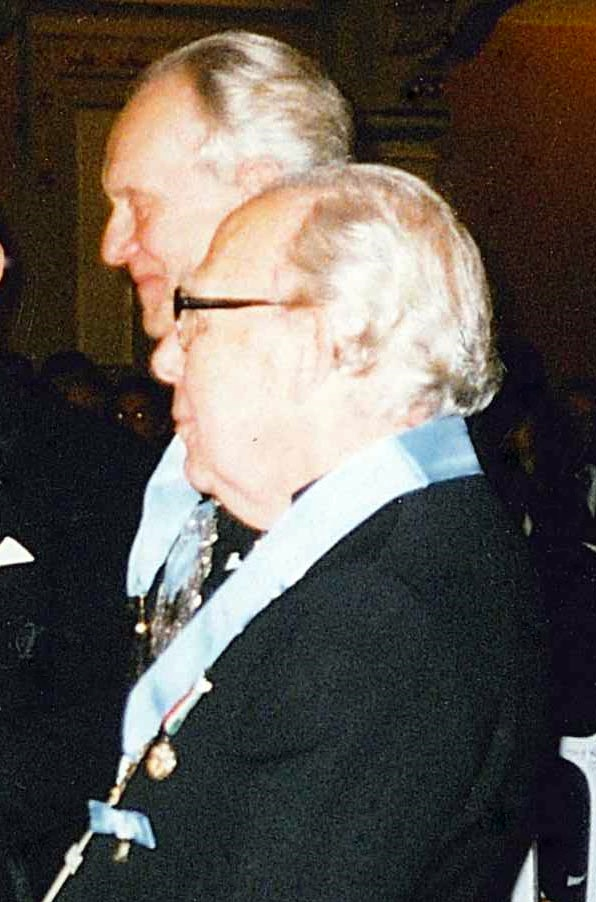
- Per-Olov Ahrén (in front) in 1998.
- Diocese: Diocese of Lund
- In office: 1980–1992
- Predecessor: Olle Nivenius
- Successor: K. G. Hammar

Personal details
- Born: 21 January 1926 Forserum, Sweden
- Died: 22 March 2014 (aged 88)
- Spouse: Gunnel Atell
- Children: 3
- Coat of arms

Per-Olov Ahrén (1926 in Forserum, Småland, Sweden – 22 March 2004) was a Swedish clergyman who served as bishop of Lund from 1980 to 1992.

His writings include Synod and Synodal Constitution : A Study in the Swedish Church Constitution Debate, 1827-1865 (1956) and Who is in charge in the church?: An Overview of the Organization of the Church of Sweden (1961)

== See also ==
- List of bishops of Lund
