= Lundensian theology =

Lundensian theology refers to the younger school of Lutheran theology and Luther research in Lund University. Its representatives were Anders Nygren, Gustaf Aulén and Ragnar Bring. Significant works of the Lundensian school have been Christus Victor and Agape and Eros.
