= Fädernas kyrka =

1909 hymn with lyrics by Johan Alfred Eklund and music by Gustaf Aulén

- Genre: Hymn
- Text: by Johan Alfred Eklund
- Language: Swedish
- Melody: by Gustaf Aulén
- Composed: 1909
- Published: 1921

Fädernas kyrka is a 1909 hymn with lyrics by Johan Alfred Eklund and music by Gustaf Aulén.

The song appeared in a hymnal for the first time in 1921, in the "Nya psalmer" addition. The song was originally very popular, especially within "Ungkyrkorörelsen", and was added to 1937 års psalmbok. During the early 1970s left-political movement, the lyrics were considered too nationalist, and discussions begun. The song was not appointed for Den svenska psalmboken 1986, since editing the lyrics was not allowed by the copyright holders.

However, a version with changed lyrics, are in Svensk psalmbok för den evangelisk-lutherska kyrkan i Finland 1986, as number 168.

== Publication ==
- Number 533 of Nya psalmer 1921, addition for 1819 års psalmbok, under the lines "Kyrkan och nådemedlen: Kyrkans och hennes uppgift".
- Number 169 of 1937 års psalmbok under the lines "Kyrkan"
- Number 169 of Psalmer för bruk vid krigsmakten 1961 verse 1, 4 and 7
- Number 168 of Finlandssvenska psalmboken 1986
