= Canutus Hahn =

Swedish clergyman

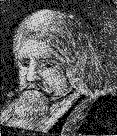
Canutus Hahn (1633–1687)

Canutus Hahn (1633–1687) was a Swedish clergyman who served as bishop of Lund 1680–1687.

Hahn was born on 13 November 1633 in Skye in Uråsa parish (Kronoberg County), son of a farmer Abraham Knutsson Hahn. He went to school in Kalmar and Växjö, enrolled at the universities of Greifswald in 1652 and studied there and at Wittenberg and Rostock until 1654. He enrolled at Uppsala, and graduated as a magister in 1661.

He became professor of philosophy at the gymnasium in Lund (now Katedralskolan) in 1662, and professor of logic and metaphysics at the newly established University of Lund in 1667, and was its rector 1669–1670. Ordained a clergyman in 1671, he served as vicar in Ronneby and Backaryd parishes in Blekinge 1671–1679. In 1679, he was appointed vicar of Landskrona parish and vice bishop of Lund, to assist the aging bishop Peder Winstrup (who was also regarded as politically unreliable by the Swedish authorities). In 1680, after Winstrup's death, Hahn succeeded him as bishop of Lund (and pro-chancellor of Lund University).

Hahn has been characterized (Olsson, see below) as a man less suited to learning than to practical issues, and his main achievement was as leader of the Swedification of the provinces Skåne and Blekinge. Through the Treaty of Lund in 1679, the former Danish provinces had been allowed the right to keep their Danish laws and customs. The realization of "uniformity" in church language, liturgy and education was a violation of the treaty but the war had convinced the Swedish authorities that it was necessary to push it through in order to retain the provinces. Hahn called in an assembly of parish priests from the diocese in 1681 and convinced them to send a request to Governor-General Rutger von Ascheberg for the realization of uniformity throughout the provinces. According to Hahn's biographer Bror Olsson, the Swedification went smoothly and was largely completed by his death in 1687.

He was appointed bishop of Växjö in 1687 but died on 29 December of that year, before he could take office.
