= Aage Jepsen Sparre =

Danish archbishop (c.1460–1540)

- Archbishop-Elect of Lund
- Church: Catholic Church
- Archdiocese: Archdiocese of Lund
- In office: December 1519 – June 1532
- Predecessor: Birger Gunnersen
- Successor: Jørgen Skodborg

Personal details
- Born: c. 1460
- Died: c. 1540 (aged 79–80)

Aage Jepsen Sparre (c. 1460–1540) was a Danish priest who was archbishop of Lund from 1523 to 1532.

Sparre enrolled at the University of Greifswald in Mecklenburg-Vorpommern in 1483 and graduated in 1490.

== See also ==
- List of bishops of Lund
