= Christina Odenberg =

Swedish Lutheran cleric

The Right Reverend Christina Odenberg
- Bishop Emeritus of Lund
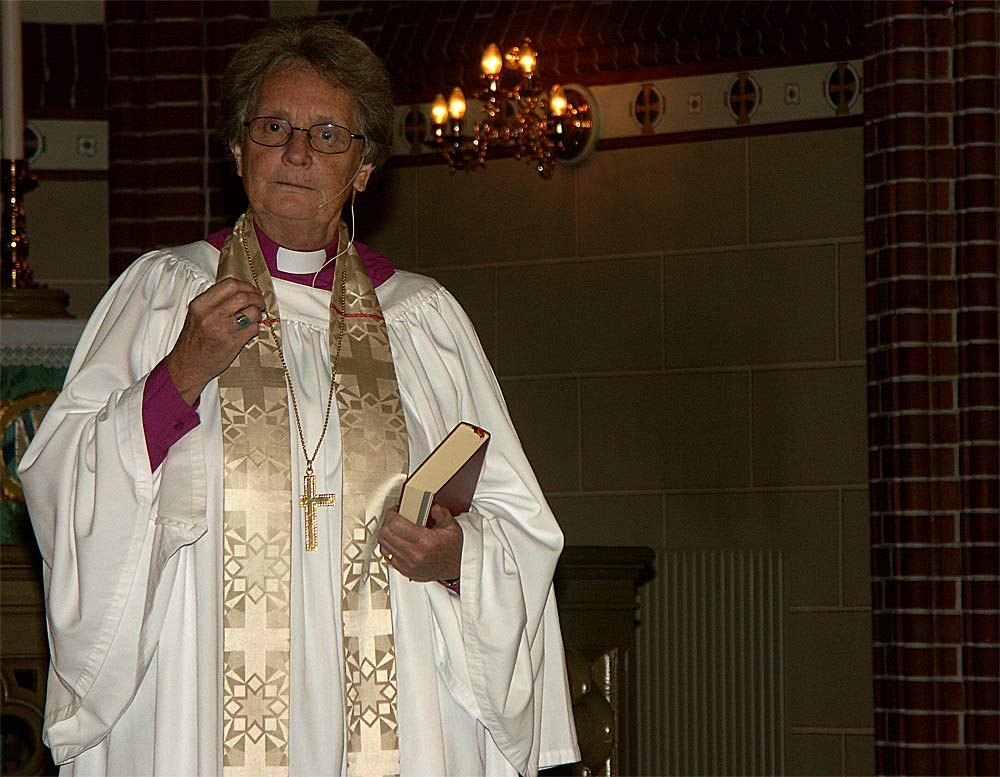
- Church: Church of Sweden
- Diocese: Diocese of Lund

Personal details
- Born: 26 March 1940
- Coat of arms

Christina Odenberg (born 26 March 1940) is the retired bishop of the Diocese of Lund in Sweden between 1997 and 2007.

== Biography ==
Christina Odenberg is the daughter of Ingemar Odenberg and Kerstin, born Moberg. Odenberg was for some time politically active in the Moderate party and her brother Mikael Odenberg was Sweden's Minister for Defence 2006–2007. She was ordained in Stockholm on 17 December 1967. She served as a priest in Östergötland county first as an assistant vicar in Östra Ryd then as vicar in Österåker-Östra Ryd. 1990 she became a contact priest in Roslags kontrakt. When the then bishop of the Diocese of Lund K. G. Hammar was made archbishop of Uppsala Odenberg was appointed as his successor on 5 June 1997, and was ordained bishop on 5 October the same year. This made her the first woman to become a bishop in the history of the Church of Sweden.

On 27 December 2001 she caused a lot of attention and from some circles outrage when she in a sermon called "the gift of Love" blessed the partnership of Anna Karin Hammar and Ninna Edgardh Beckman. She was even by some groups accused of breaking her priestly pledges by blessing something they claimed as a sin.

Odenberg is the spiritual protector of the Swedish section of the Order of Saint Lazarus

In January 2007 she received H. M. The King's Medal of the 12th size in the Seraphim ribbon.

Christina Odenberg retired on 31 March 2007 and was succeeded by Antje Jackelén.
