= Nils Bolander =

Swedish prelate

The Right Reverend Nils Bolander
- Bishop of Lund
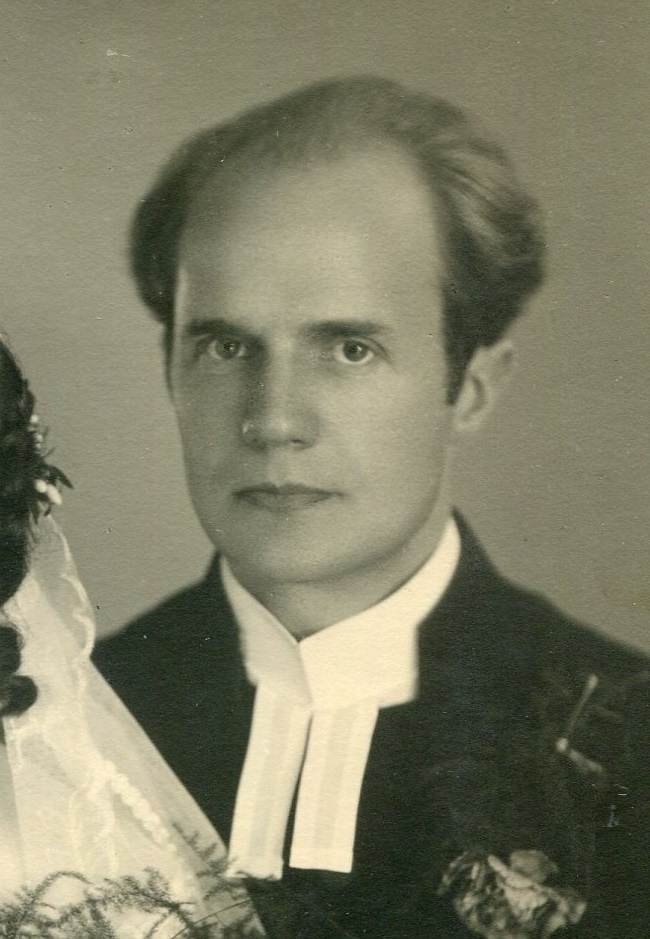
- Bolander in 1933
- Church: Church of Sweden
- Diocese: Lund
- Elected: 1958
- In office: 1958–1959
- Predecessor: Anders Nygren
- Successor: Berndt (Martin) Lindström

Orders
- Consecration: 1958

Personal details
- Born: 19 July 1902 Västerås, Sweden
- Died: 7 December 1959 (aged 57) Lund, Sweden
- Buried: Norra cemetery, Lund
- Spouse: Vera Silfverstolpe (1927-1932); Bengta Ridderstedt (1933-1959)

Nils Fredrik Bolander (18 July 1902 in Västerås - 7 December 1959 in Lund) was a Swedish prelate who served as Bishop of Lund.

== Biography ==
He was the son of cathedral organist Carl Johan Bolander, who according to the bishop's main biographer was an extramarital son of King Charles XV of Sweden. (Carl Johan Bolander was born 4 February 1854 in Bankeryd and died 28 July 1903 in Västerås.) Bolander served as pastor of Engelbrekt Parish in Stockholm and as dean in Lund. In 1958 he was elected as bishop of Lund, a post he held till his death a year later. Bolander was buried in Norra Cemetery in Lund.

Bolander was also a poet, hymn writer, and a member of Hedemoraparnassen. In 1927 he married Vera Silfverstolpe at Sura (divorced 1932), and in 1933 Bengta Ridderstedt at Stora Tuna Church.

== Poetry ==
- På vakt
- Frisk ungdom
- Död dag
- I yttersta stridslinjen
- I Stenbrottet

== Psalms ==
- Herren gav och Herren tog
- Tätt intill korset äro alla trygga

== Sources ==
=== Printed Sources ===
- Kristen-Nationell lyrik, published by Sveriges kristliga krigsmannaförbund, Uppsala, 5th ed. 1941.
- Nils Bolander. Nådens budbärare. Minnesskrift, Sven Håkan Ohlsson, editor, SKDB, Stockholm, 1960.
- Nils Bolander, diktare och predikant. Sahlberg, Carl-Erik, KM-förlaget, Malmö, 1994.
- igår, idag, imorgon. Nils Bolander, Votum Förlag, 2012.
