= Peder Winstrup =

Scandinavian, protestant theologian

The Right Reverend Peder Winstrup
- Bishop of Lund
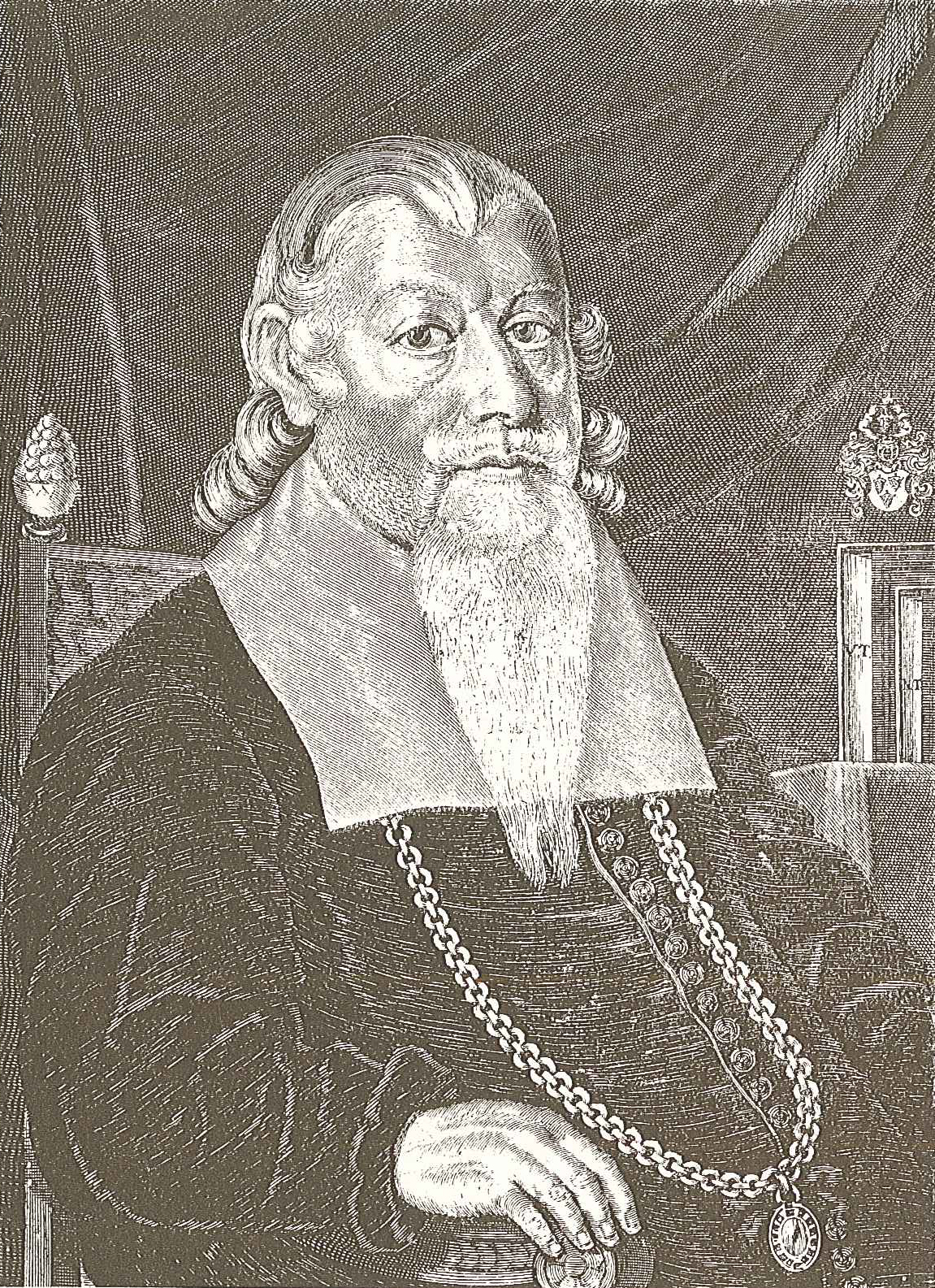
- Bishop Peder Winstrup on a contemporary engraving printed in one of his own theological works in 1666
- Church: Church of Denmark and Church of Sweden
- Diocese: Lund
- Appointed: 1638
- Installed: 1638
- Term ended: 28 December 1679
- Predecessor: Mads Jensen Medelfar
- Successor: Canutus Hahn

Personal details
- Born: Peder Pedersen Winstrup; April 30, 1605 Copenhagen, Denmark–Norway
- Died: December 28, 1679 (aged 74)
- Buried: Lund Cathedral
- Parents: Peder Jensen Vinstrup

Peder Pedersen Winstrup (30 April 1605 – 28 December 1679) was Bishop of Lund in Scania. Winstrup was bishop there during a period spanning both Danish and Swedish sovereignty and periods of war when the land was contested. He was married to the Danish noblewoman, Dorothea von Andersen who was an influential person in her own right in Scania and known to be strongly pro-Danish.

== Early life and education ==
Winstrup was born in Copenhagen, then the capital of Denmark–Norway, on 30 April 1605. He was the son of Peder Jensen Vinstrup, Bishop of Zealand and professor of theology at the University of Copenhagen. After his father's death in 1614, his mother married his successor as bishop. Peder Winstrup the younger studied at the universities of Rostock, Wittenberg, Leipzig, and Jena in Germany and graduated from the University of Copenhagen in 1633. In 1635, he was appointed royal chaplain in the household of King Christian IV. He was awarded a doctorate in theology in 1636 and was made bishop of Lund in 1638.

== Career ==
After Scania and the other provinces included in his diocese had been ceded to Sweden through the Treaty of Roskilde in 1658, Winstrup pledged loyalty to his new sovereign, Charles X Gustav, and he was ennobled under the name Himmelstierna, a name he never actually used. In 1658, he suggested that a new university should be founded in Lund (at the location of the former Academy of Lund) and where there was already a renowned Latin School, but received little response from the king. When the Swedish authorities eventually decided to start up a university there a few years later, at least part of the initiative lay with a subordinate priest in the diocese, Bernhardus Oelreich, and Winstrup now turned against the idea.

After the University of Lund was officially inaugurated in 1668, Oelreich was appointed the prokansler ("pro-chancellor"), despite the statutes giving this position to the Bishop. After a long political struggle, Oelreich was sent off to Germany and Winstrup was appointed to this position in 1671. Despite rumours accusing him for lack of loyalty to the Swedish crown, he remained bishop until his death in 1679. The Swedish governor-general Sperling appointed a Swedish vice bishop to keep an eye on Winstrup during his later years and Winstrup very much resented this.

Just the fact that Winstrup's wife wrote confidential letters to exponents of the Danish government would have been enough to court-martial the couple, but the Swedish authorities were unaware of Dorothea von Andersen's correspondence with her powerful Danish friends. However, before the war she had caused her husband embarrassment and trouble in Sweden because she declared in public that Swedes were dogs and their children shouldn't have access to school scholarships in Scania.

One of the reasons that the Swedes became increasingly suspicious of Winstrup was that he willingly obliged the Danes when they reconquered Scania in 1676. Between June and December that year, Scania was under Danish rule again and Winstrup, like most of the Scanians, seemed happy enough with that. The Scanian War (1675–79) was the bloodiest war in Scandinavian history and took a disastrous toll on the Scanian population. After the battle of Lund on 4 December 1676, the Swedes slowly wrenched back their grip on Scania and at the peace negotiations 1679, Swedish rule was legally re-established. Winstrup and his family had experienced their fair share of tribulations during the war. In a letter from 4 October 1678, Winstrup's wife Dorothea wrote to the Danish district governor (amtmand) Knud Thott to complain that she and her husband were stuck in the bishop's residence (Lundegaard) in the city of Lund, and that everything had been destroyed; the city burnt down (most lately by Danish troops, before that by continuous fighting), their property confiscated, their food taken away, their carriage confiscated, they had nothing and her husband's health was in decline. "God knows that Calamity has stricken us often during these times of war...my husband's health is very weak and that he should have to experience this in his old age - they have taken all that we need to survive, and then we had this great fire ("storre ilde bran")...". They had been asked to move out of their house but had nowhere to go and were both terribly frightened, so they had ended up stuck in the middle of the war zone. Winstrup died shortly after the end of the Scanian War.

== Exhumation ==
In June 2015 Winstrup's grave was moved from the crypt of the Lund cathedral to its northern tower. The body was taken away temporarily for research. It was in a well-preserved condition. The body of a fetus was discovered in the Winstrup's coffin, tucked in under the feet of the bishop. The fetus, wrapped in a piece of linen cloth, is believed to have been five to six months old. It is presumably a grandson of Winstrup. Swedish researchers have established a family connection with the help of DNA material from the bishop and the fetus, according to Lund University. According to the study, the boy and Winstrup share 25 percent of the genes; it is a second-degree relationship. It was not unusual for the time for young children to be placed in coffins with adults. Y-DNA: R1b-Z209>R1b1a1b1a1a2a1a1a1~-BY54766; mtDNA: H3b7.

== Bibliography ==
- H. F. Rørdam, "Vinstrup, Peder Pedersen, 1605-79, Biskop", (in Danish) Dansk biografisk leksikon, XIX. Bind. Vind - Oetken, pp. 53–56.
- Forscher lösen Rätsel um Bischofs-Mumie, die mit einem Fötus begraben wurde, (in German)
