= Bertil Werkström =

The Most Reverend Bertil Werkström
- Archbishop of Uppsala; Primate of Sweden
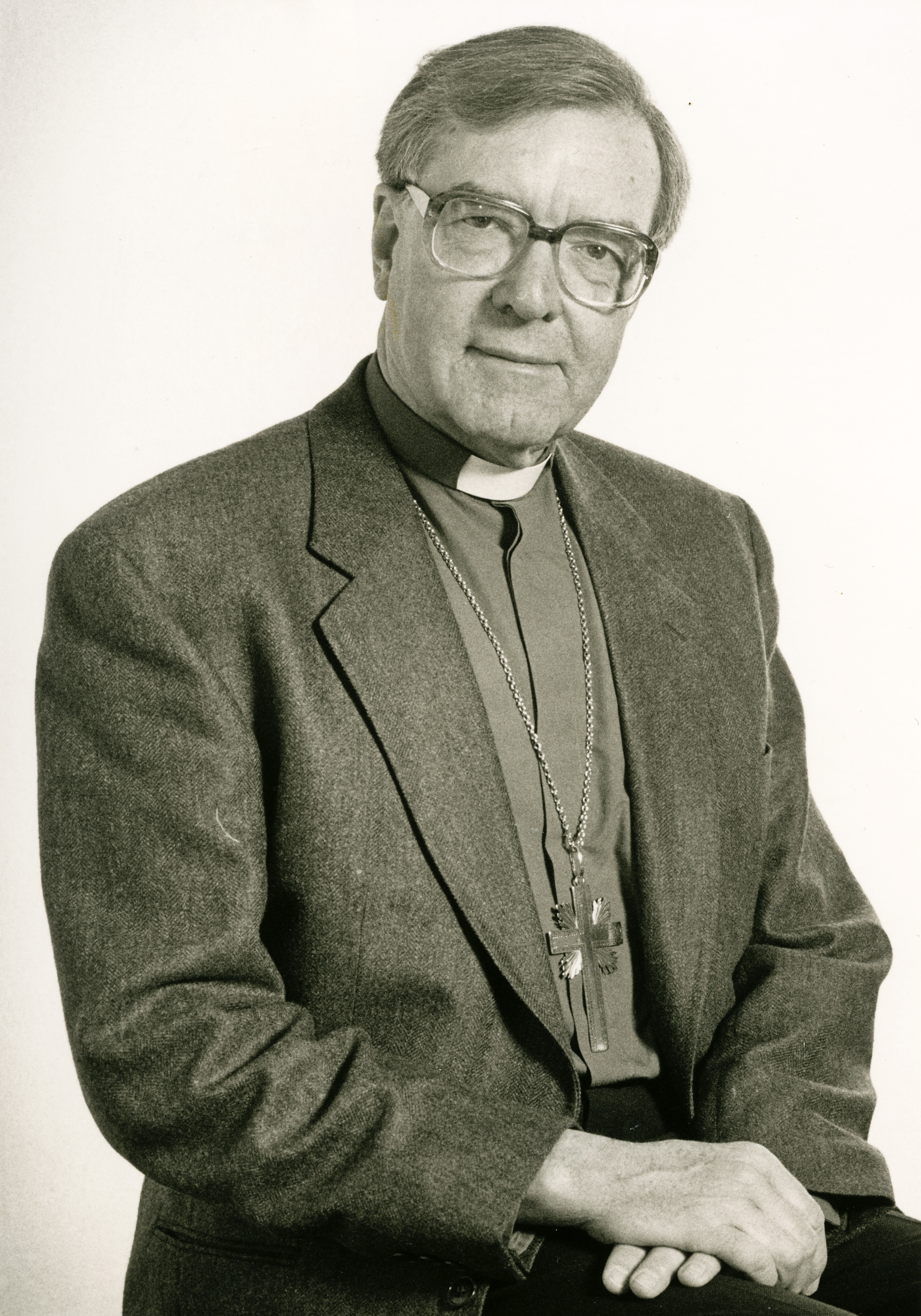
- Church: Church of Sweden
- Archdiocese: Uppsala
- Appointed: 1983
- In office: 1983–1993
- Predecessor: Olof Sundby
- Successor: Gunnar Weman
- Previous post: Bishop of Härnösand (1975-1983)

Orders
- Ordination: 1954
- Consecration: 12 October 1975 by Olof Sundby
- Rank: Metropolitan Archbishop

Personal details
- Born: 9 June 1928 Lund, Sweden
- Died: 10 July 2010 (aged 82) Stockholm, Sweden
- Parents: Gunnar Werkström; Ingar Hedenskog
- Spouse: Brita Caroli
- Education: Lund University
- Coat of arms

Bertil Werkström (9 June 1928 – 10 July 2010) was Archbishop of Uppsala from 1983 to 1993.

== Early years and education ==
Bertil Werkström was the son of the Gunnar Werkström (1904-1975) and Ingar Hedenskog (1908-1971). He grew up in Dalsland and studied theology at Lund University in 1954. He graduated in 1959. Afterwards he underwent hospitalization in the United States between 1959 and 1960. He became a doctor of theology in 1963 with the dissertation Bekännelse och avlösning. En typologisk undersökning av Luthers, Thurneysens och Buchmans biktuppfattningar (Confession and Relief. A Typological Examination of Lutheran, Thurneysen and Buchman's Concept of Conflict). In 1959 he married Brita Caroli, who died in 2013. During his time as Archbishop he supported ecumenical efforts and in international affairs favored sanctions against Apartheid South Africa. In 1984 he also maintained that homosexuality was "against the orders of creation."

== Ministry ==
Werkström was a hospital priest in Sundsvall between 1964 and 1970 and Rector of Sköndalsinstitutet between 1970 and 1975. He became the royal chief predictor in 1974. In 1975 he was elected Bishop of Härnösand, a post he kept till 1983 when he was elected Archbishop of Uppsala and Primate of Sweden. He retired in 1993. He died in 2010 after a long-term illness.

== Porvoo Communion ==
Werkström was active in the creation of the Porvoo Communion, which is a recognition and an agreement of unity between Lutheran churches in the Nordic and Baltic countries and Anglican churches on the British Isles. The so-called Porvoo agreement was signed in 1992 in the city of Porvoo in Finland.

== Rome visit ==
In 1991, he visited Rome to commemorate the 600th anniversary of the canonization of Bridget of Sweden together with the Roman Catholic pope.
