= Ecce Homo (exhibition) =

1998 exhibition of work by Elisabeth Ohlson Wallin

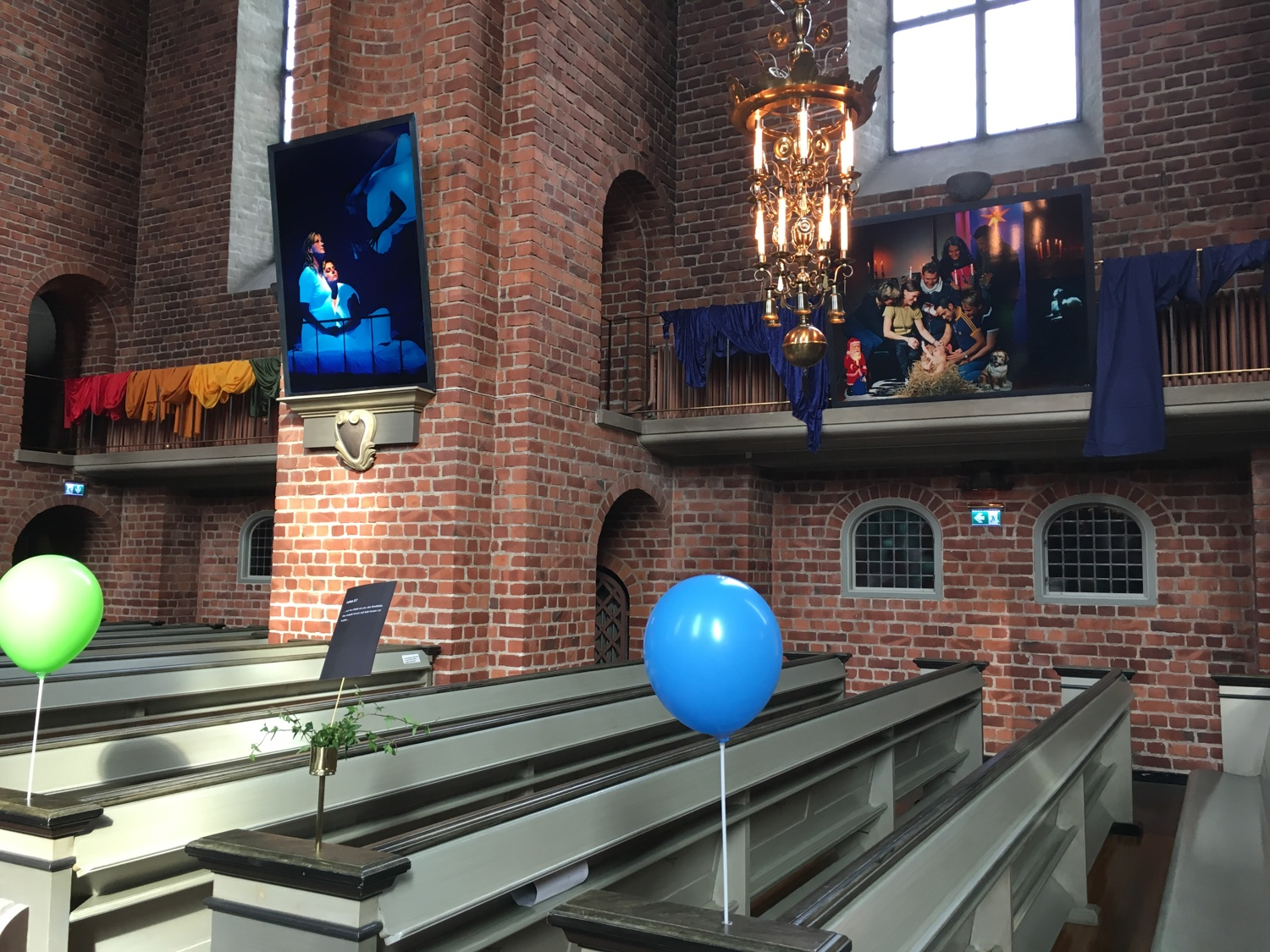
Image from Klosters church in Eskilstuna during Springpride 2016, shows two works from the Ecce Homo exhibition.

Ecce Homo was a controversial exhibition of 12 photographs of different biblical situations, in modern surroundings, taken by the Swedish photographer Elisabeth Ohlson Wallin. The first vernissage of the exhibition was in Stockholm, July 1998 and attracted much attention. When the exhibition was shown in the cathedral of Uppsala in September it caused a national debate. The reactions was often very emotional, and both positive and negative. The photos portrayed Jesus among homosexuals, transgender people, leatherpeople, and people with AIDS. The exhibition toured Scandinavia and continental Europe between 1998 and 2004. An Ecce Homo exhibition opened in October 2012 in the Belgrade Pride festival in Belgrade, Serbia, and was guarded by a number of riot police, due to rioting in the ensuing controversy.

== The photographs ==
The photos recreated classical Christian motifs, but substituted the persons or the surrounding context with lesbian, gay, bisexual and transgender-related (LGBT) issues and persons. An example of context substitution is the recreation of the motif of Mary holding Jesus (the Pietà motif), with the surrounding context being that of a medical facility, with Jesus dying from AIDS.

The photographs are all connected to, and shown together with, quotations from the Bible and depicts: Annunciation Luk 1:30–31, Birth of Jesus Luk 2:7, Baptism of Jesus Luk 3:21–22, Woes of the Pharisees Matt 23:13, The Arriving to Jerusalem Luk 19:37–40, Last Supper Matt 26:26–28, The kiss of Judas Matt 26:45–48, Jesus being weighed down by the cross Mark 15:17–20, Crucifixion of Jesus Matt 27:45–46, Pietàn Joh 19:26, Jesus showing himself to the women Matt 28:9–10 and Heaven Matt 18:18. Many of the pictures are inspired of classical paintings and all of them are photographed in a modern surrounding. The photographer has deliberately used homosexual models to communicate the likeness between biblical situations of being unaccepted and modern ones, and to show the all-embracing love of God. On the photo of the Last Supper there are transgender instead of homosexual models, as a comment of the fact that Jesus according to the Bible often partook in meals together with people not accepted by society.

== Exhibition ==
Ecce Homo was first exhibited in Sweden in 1998, being shown in venues around the country, including Uppsala Cathedral and the Swedish parliament building in Stockholm. It was subsequently exhibited in several other countries, including Serbia in 2012, where it was on display for only two hours. In 2023 it was part of an exhibition of Ohlson Wallin's work on display at the European Parliament.

== Controversy ==
As the exhibition toured Sweden, primarily in churches and congregations of the Lutheran Church of Sweden, it sparked an intense debate both from within the church and from other churches. Slides of the photographs were shown in Uppsala Cathedral with the permission of the dean Tuulikki Koivunen Bylund, sanctioned by K. G. Hammar, the archbishop of Uppsala and head of the Church of Sweden. The opinion of Swedish society was deeply polarized, with some considering it to be a radical expression of Christian love while others considered it to be sacrilegious. According to Hammar, "We had two piles of letters, they were about the same size all of the time."

Some LGBT members of the church described the showing and defend the exhibition as the first time they felt at home in the church and embraced by it. Other LGBT members felt the pictures perpetuated stereotypes about their community, or felt more alienated from the church after the vitriolic debate that followed the exhibition. Tord Harlin, the bishop of Uppsala, described the exhibition as "At best it is bad theology, at worst it is blasphemy." Reflecting upon the exhibition in an interview in 2004, K. G. Hammar said:

Yes I found the picture difficult at a personal level, but that wasn't the issue. This was about homosexuals, a group who have a hard time to feel at home in the church. Should pictures which in a very charged way illustrated their part in Jesus be removed just because we found them difficult on a personal level? Then we would have sent the signal that the church and the homosexuals are two different worlds which are not to be mixed.

The photo considered most controversial was the one portraying the baptism of Jesus in a public bathhouse, in which the penis of the Jesus character was visible.

Due to archbishop K. G. Hammar's sanction and defense of the exhibition, the Pope John Paul II cancelled an audience granted to the archbishop planned for mid October 1998. A year later, the archbishop met with the Pope to confirm a new theological agreement between Lutherans and Catholics. The cancelled audience, the exhibition or the topic of homosexuality were not brought up at the meeting.

== See also ==
- Homosexuality and Christianity
