= Agape and Eros =

Book by Anders Nygren

- Author: Anders Nygren
- Translator: Philip S. Watson
- Language: Swedish
- Subject: Love: Religious aspects, Christianity
- Publisher: S.P.C.K., Westminster Press, Harper & Row
- Publication date: 1930, 1936
- English publication date: 1953 (complete)
- Pages: 764 pp.
- OCLC: 77003058
- Dewey Decimal: 231.6
- LC Class: BV4639.N813

Agape and Eros (Swedish: Eros och Agape) is the shorthand English name given to the treatise written by the Swedish Protestant theologian Anders Nygren, which was first published in Swedish in two parts in 1930 and 1936. Its complete title in the English language was Agape and Eros - a study of the Christian idea of love.

Nygren was one of the theologians who had formed the so-called Lundensian School of Theology, in which other important figures were Gustaf Aulén and Ragnar Bring. They all shared a keen interest in rediscovering major motifs of Luther's Reformation theology, and examining how such motifs had been employed in different ways throughout history. In this context, Nygren was examining the motif of love.

== Argument ==
The book analyses the connotations of two ancient Greek words for love, eros and agape (unconditional love).

Nygren argues that eros is an egocentric and acquisitive kind of love, needs-based and desire-based. When we love out of eros - whether we love a god or another human being -, we love out of self-interest and in order to acquire and possess the object of our love. This form of love received its classic expression in the philosophy of Plato, particularly in his dialogue The Symposium.

Agape, by contrast, is a self-giving and self-sacrificial kind of love. It is based on God's unconditional love for all creatures. When we love out of agape we reject all self-gain and interest, and surrender ourselves to the other and love them purely for themselves.

For Nygren, agape is the properly Christian understanding of love, as is evident from New Testament texts such as the Synoptic Gospels, Paul's theology of the cross, and the identification of God and agape in the First Letter of John. Nygren therefore argues that agape is the only truly Christian kind of love, and that eros turns us away from God. Either we love others and God in the manner of eros, purely for ourselves, in which case we do not really love them at all; or we love them in the manner of agape, for themselves, with a true love, in which case we act against our own self-interest and happiness.

Nygren also traces the historical roots of what he perceives to be the loss of this concept of agape. He argues that from St. Augustine onward, the focus on agape became diluted by an attempt to synthesize the concept with that of eros, in a development centered on the Latin word caritas. Nygren argues that most medieval theology of love was based around this attempt at a caritas-synthesis. However, he argues, this is not a truly Christian synthesis, given the origins and nature of eros. The Reformation, therefore, was hugely important because it inspired Martin Luther to expose the fallacy of the caritas synthesis, and made clear again the properly Christian conception of love, namely pure agape.

== Publication history ==
The Original Swedish title is: Den kristna kärlekstanken genom tiderna: Eros och Agape (which translates as, The Christian idea of love through the ages: Eros and Agape). It appeared initially in two parts, the first volume in 1930 and the second in 1936. A later reprint reduced the title: Eros och Agape, (Stockholm, 1966).

The title of the English translation is Agape and Eros, not Eros and Agape. This seems to stem from the first (slightly abridged) translation of the first part: Agape and Eros, translated by A.G. Hebert (London: SPCK, 1932). The second part was first translated by Philip S. Watson and published in two volumes in 1938–9.

The first translation of the full work was by Philip S. Watson (London: SPCK, 1953, one volume). A revised edition by the same translator appeared in 1982 (Chicago: University of Chicago Press, and London: SPCK).

=== Outline ===
Volume one contains two parts:

- Introduction: "The Problem of Agape and Eros"
- Part One: "Two Fundamental Motifs" (agape, eros, and their fundamental contrasts)

Volume two consists of a single part:

- Part Two: "Fundamental Motifs in Conflict" (a historical essay on the disappearance and reappearance of the agape motif).

== Influence ==
Nygren's work has been described as 'probably the most influential Protestant account of love in the twentieth century'. For example, Martin Luther King Jr. shows clear influence by Nygren's categories in a sermon where he discussed Jesus' command to love one's enemies:

When Jesus bids us to love our enemies, he is speaking neither of eros not philia, he is speaking of agape, understanding and creative, redemptive goodwill for all men. Only by following this way and responding with this type of love are we able to be children of our Father who is in heaven."

A generation later, however, with the work of Paul Tillich and Karl Rahner, Christian theology has turned away from Nygren's stark dualism of agape and eros and back towards a more unified conception of love. For example, Pope Benedict XVI in his encyclical, Deus caritas est (2005), concluded that both eros and agape are aspects of divine love.
