= Gunnar Weman =

Swedish Lutheran clergyman (1932–2024)

The Most Reverend Gunnar Weman
- Archbishop Emeritus of Uppsala; Primate Emeritus of Sweden
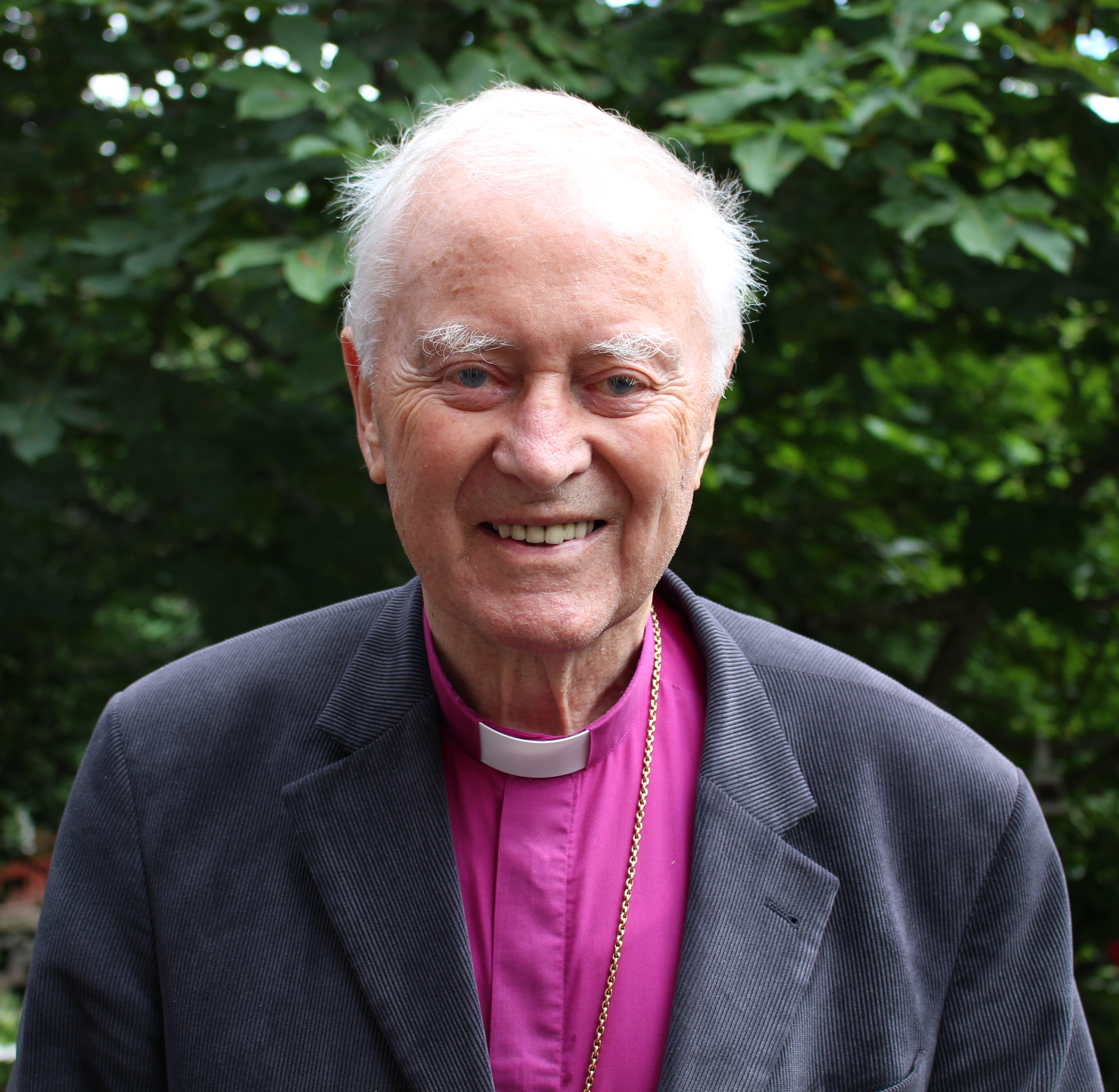
- Church: Church of Sweden
- Archdiocese: Uppsala
- Appointed: 1993
- In office: 1993–1997
- Predecessor: Bertil Werkström
- Successor: K. G. Hammar

Orders
- Ordination: 25 May 1958
- Consecration: 5 October 1986 by Bertil Werkström

Personal details
- Born: 25 February 1932 Uppsala, Sweden
- Died: 24 February 2024 (aged 91) Sigtuna, Sweden

Gunnar Weman (25 February 1932 – 24 February 2024) was a Swedish priest who served as Archbishop of Uppsala from 1993 to 1997. Weman was the son of Henry Weman who was the cathedral organist in Uppsala.

== Biography ==
Weman was ordained in 1958 and was stationed as a priest in Sigtuna and later in Uppsala in 1959, before he became a student and study secretary of the Swedish Church Mission Board in Uppsala. Between 1964 and 1984 he was again stationed in Sigtuna, first as curate and then rector in 1969. From 1985 to 1986 he was director and head of the Swedish Church Board for worship and evangelism. He then became bishop of the Diocese of Luleå and in 1993 Archbishop of Uppsala and Primate of Sweden. He retired in 1997.

Weman was Secretary of the National Association of Youth and Church of Sweden Christian student movement and a member of the Swedish church's mission board and its executive committee. Through various assignments, he was active for the Swedish church's worship renewal and included the secretary of the Swedish Church's liturgical committee. In 2006 he became doctor of theology with a thesis entitled Contemporary worship and medieval churches.

Weman was involved in Ecumenical efforts with other Christians, but his efforts to encourage goodwill to the Muslim community in Sweden met with some internal difficulties.

Weman died in Sigtuna at the age of 91 on 24 February 2024, the day before he would have turned 92.

Church of Sweden titles
Preceded by Bertil Werkström	Archbishop of Uppsala; Lutheran Primate of Sweden; 1993–1997	Succeeded by K. G. Hammar
