= List of bishops of Lund =

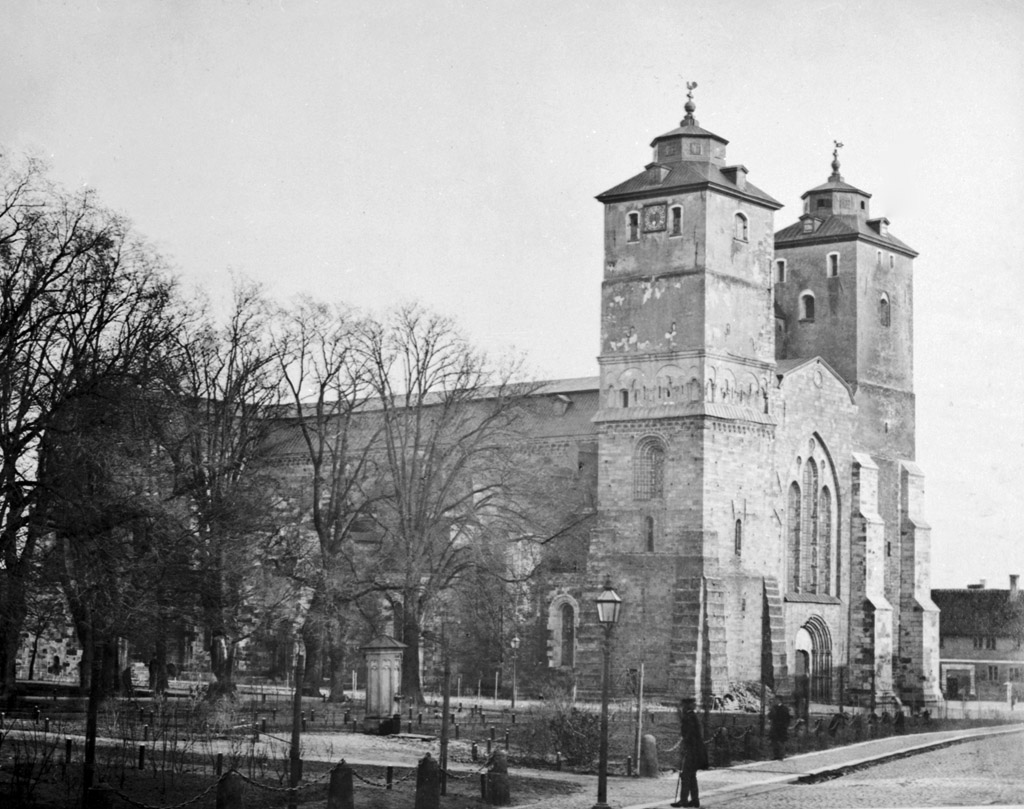
Lund Cathedral in c. 1870, before Helgo Zettervall's changes to the western end of the building.

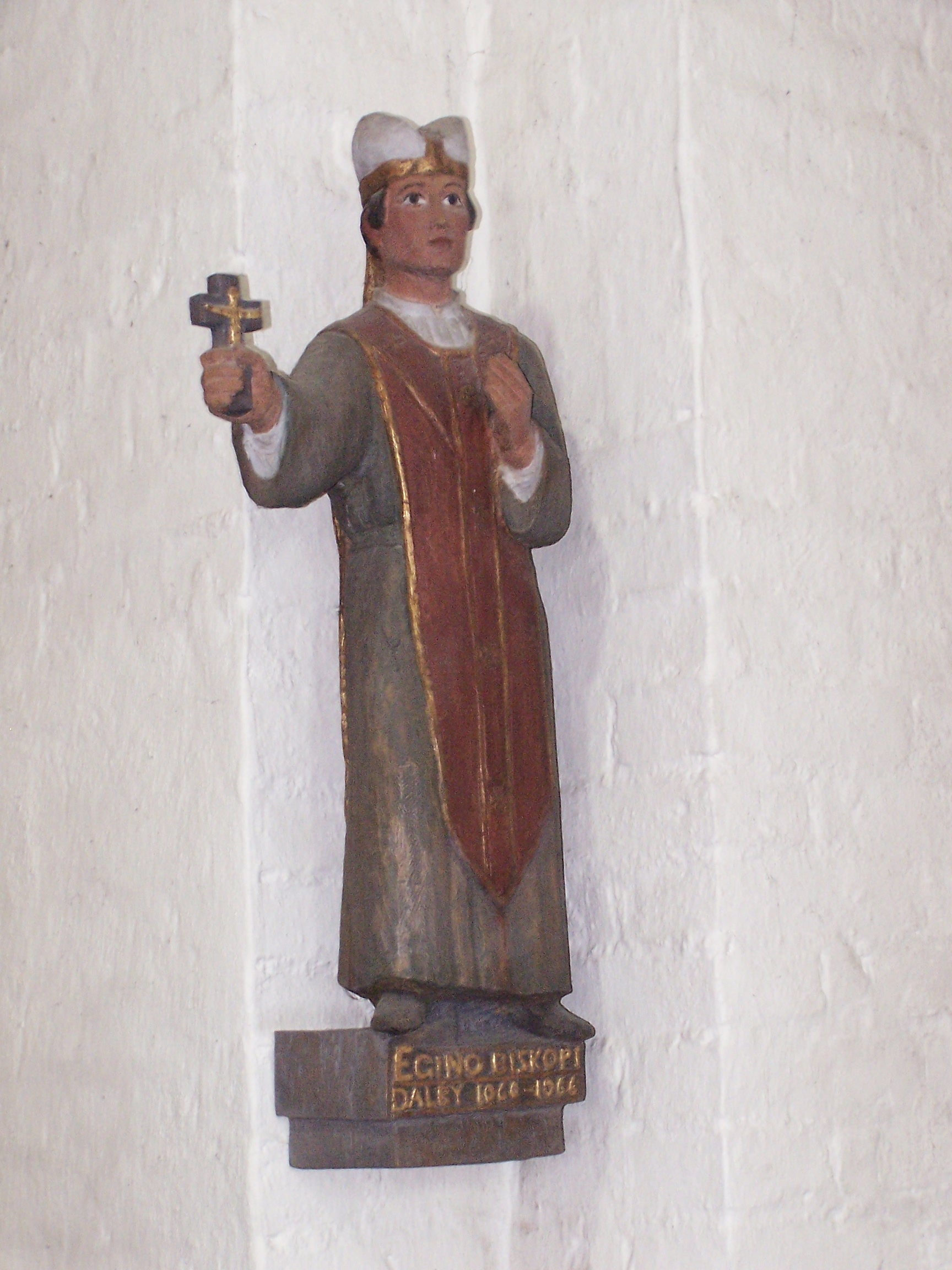
Sculpture in Dalby Church of Egino, Bishop of Lund 1062–1075.

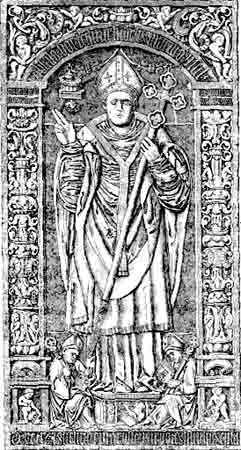
Absalon's gravestone in the monastery church in Sorø, Denmark, Absalon was Archbishop of Lund 1177–1201.

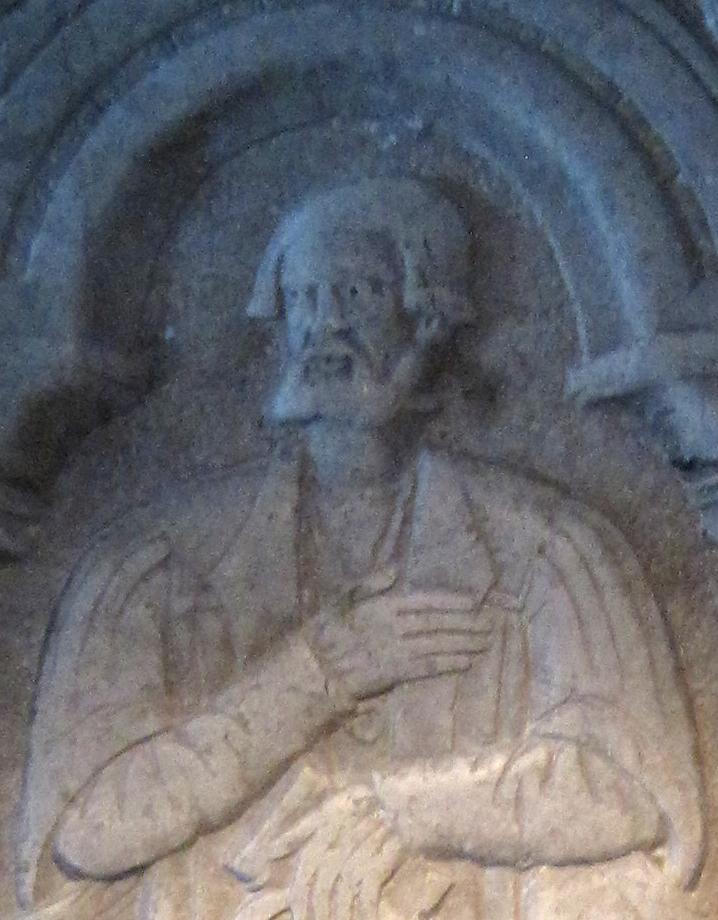
Torben Bille was Lund's and Denmark's last Catholic archbishop, removed from his office as a result of the Danish Reformation in 1536.

List of (arch)bishops of Lund. Until the Danish Reformation the centre of a great Latin (arch)bishopric, Lund has been in Sweden since the Treaty of Roskilde in 1658. The Diocese of Lund is now one of thirteen in the Church of Sweden.

== Catholic Episcopate ==
(all Roman Rite; some dates disputed according to the source)

Suffragan Bishops of Lund

- Henrik (1060–1065? or 1048? – death 21 August 1060)
- Egino (1065? – death 19 October 1072); ?former bishop of Dalby
- Ricwald (1072 or 1075 – death 26 May 1089)
- Ascer (1089–1103 see below)

Metropolitan Archbishops of Lund

- Ascer (see above 1103 – death 5 May 1137)
- Eskil (1138 or 1137–1177 or 1179)
- Absalon Hvide (1177 or 1179 – death 21 March 1201)
- Andreas Sunesen (1201–1222 or 1223)
- Peder Saxesen (11 January 1224 – death 11 July 1228)
- Uffe Thrugotsen (1228 or 1230 – death 15 December 1252)
- Jakob Erlandsen (13 August 1253 – death 18 February 1274)
- Trugot Torstensen (13 January 1276 or 1277 – death 2 May 1280)
- Jens Dros (13 April 1280 or 1282 – death 28 April 1288 or 1299)
- Jens Grand (18 March 1289 or 1290 – 30 March 1302), later * titular Prince-Archbishop of Riga (Latvia, 30 March 1304 or 1302 – 11 February 1310), Prince-Archbishop of Bremen (11 February 1310 – death 30 May 1327)
- Isarnus (Isarnus Takkon; 11 April 1302 – 12 June 1310), from Fontiès-d'Aude, previously Prince-Archbishop of Riga (Latvia, 19 December 1300 – 11 April 1302 or 1303), later Metropolitan Archbishop of Salerno (Italy) (12 June 1310 – death September 1310)
- Esger Juul (15 June 1310 – death 17 January 1325)
- Karl Eriksen (9 October 1325 – death 16 May 1334)
- Peder Jensen (Galen) (27 February 1334 or 1336 – death 16 April 1355)
- Jacob Kyrning (Thott) (5 October 1355 – death 23 January 1361)
- Niels Jensen (Bild) (25 October 1361 – death 5 February 1379)
- Magnus Nielsen (May 1379 – death 2 March 1390)
- Peder Jensen (bishop) (7 October 1390 – death 31 December 1391)
- Jakob Gertsen (Ulfstand) (13 July 1392 – death 18 April 1410)
- Peder Mickelsen Kruse (28 July 1410 – death 4 April 1418)
- Peder Lykke (Bille) (7 October 1418 – death 1436)
- Hans Laxmand (21 May 1436 – death 30 May 1443)
- Tuve Nielsen (Juul) (7 June 1443 – death 7 April 1472)
- Jens Brostrup (18 April 1472 or 1474 – death 2 June 1497)
- Birger Gunnersen (9 May 1497 or 1498 – death 23 November 1519)
- Aage Jepsen Sparre (December 1519 – June 1532)
- Jørgen Skodborg (5 January 1520 – 1521 or 1523)
- Apostolic Administrator Cardinal Paolo Emilio Cesi (6 February 1520 – 12 July 1521), Cardinal-Deacon of S. Nicola fra le Immagini pro illa vice Deaconry (6 July 1517 – 5 September 1534), later held various other apostolic administrator assignments, finally transferred Cardinal-Deacon of S. Eustachio (5 September 1534 – death 5 August 1537)
- Didrik Slagheck (1521–1522)
- Johan Weze (1522–1532)
- Torben Bille (27 July 1532 – death January 1553)

== Lutheran superintendents and bishops ==
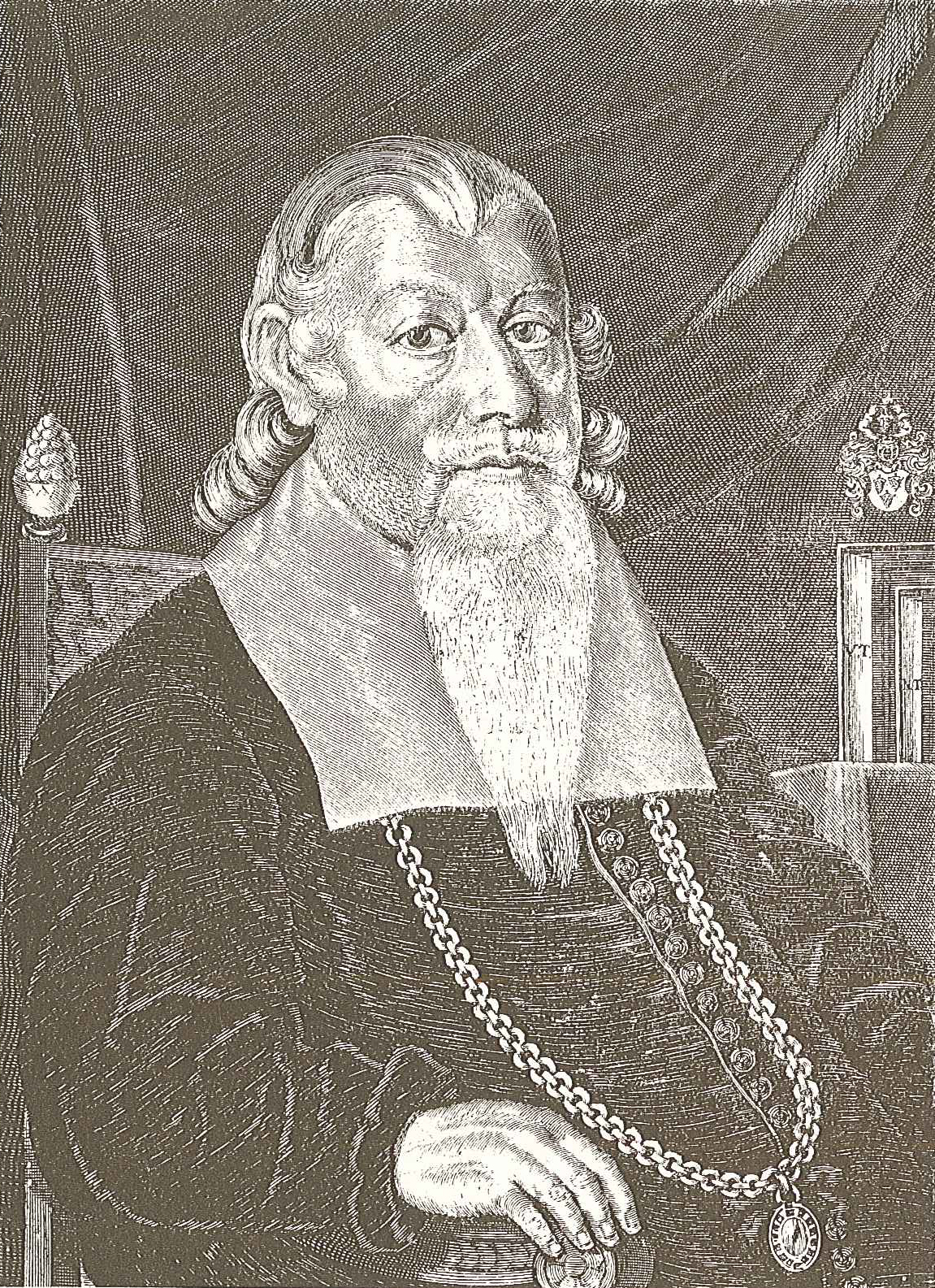
Peder Winstrup was bishop at the time the diocese of Lund went from Denmark to Sweden.

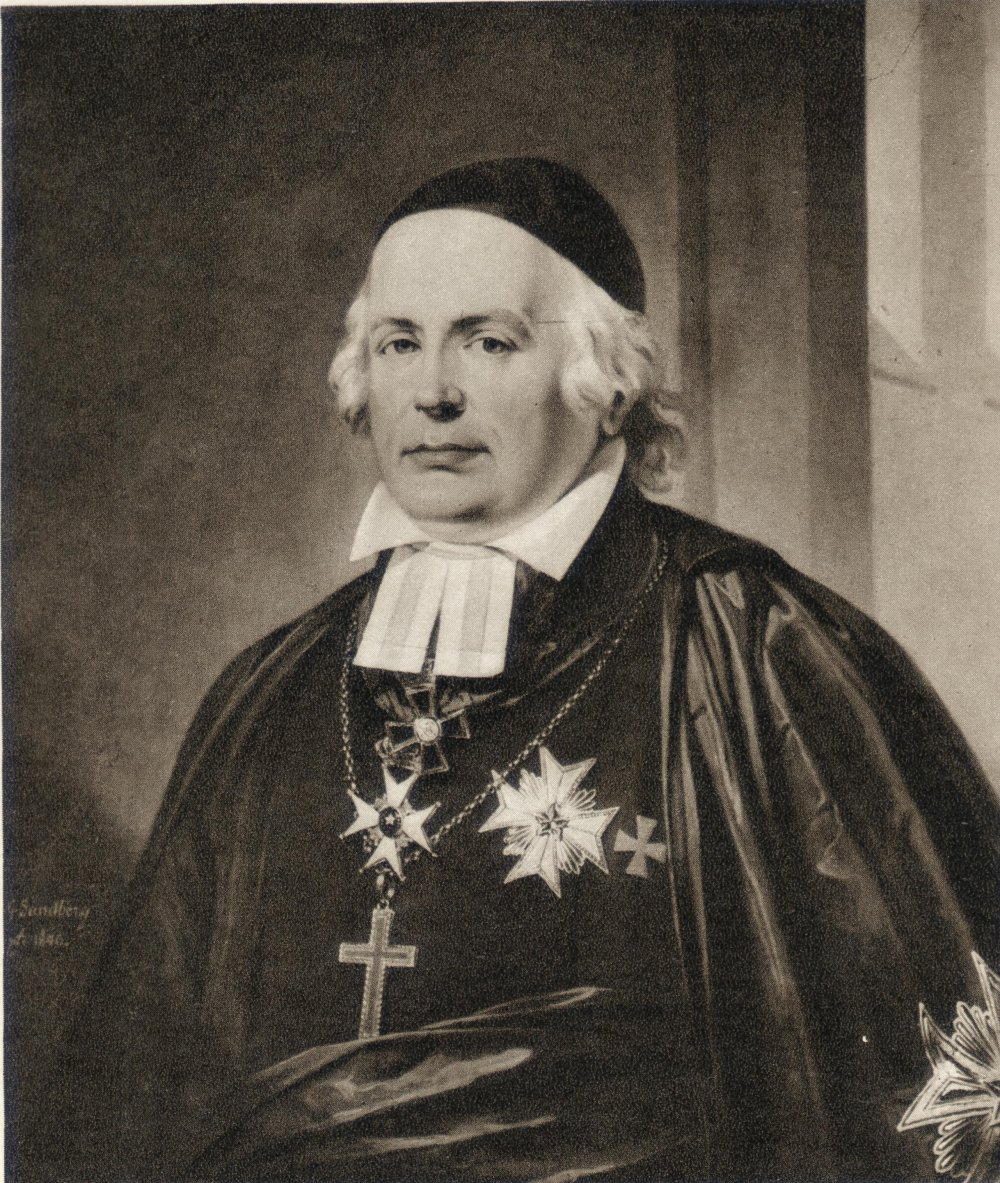
Wilhelm Faxe was bishop for 43 years (1811–1854), a period beaten only by bishop Ascer in the early Middle Ages.

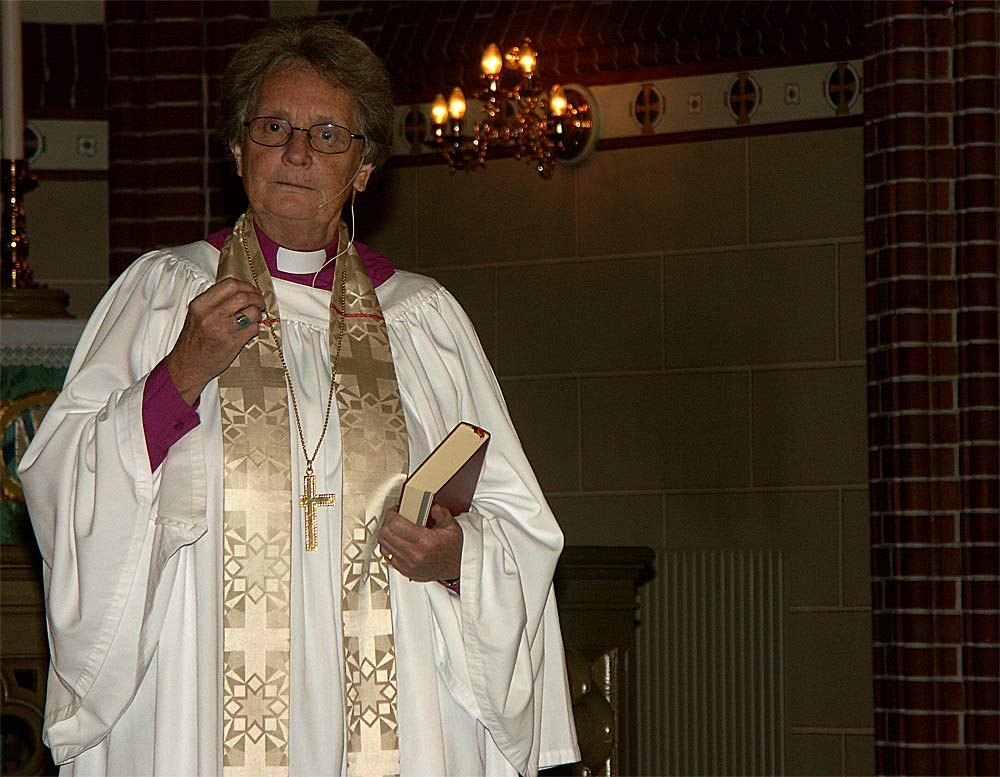
Christina Odenberg, Bishop 1997–2007, was the first woman to be bishop in Lund as well as within the church of Sweden.

- 1537–1551 – Frans Vormordsen
- 1551–1560 – Niels Palladius
- 1560–1577 – Tyge Asmundsen
- 1578–1589 – Niels Hvid
- 1589–1611 – Mogens Madsen
- 1611–1619 – Poul Aastrup
- 1620–1637 – Mads Jensen Medelfar
- 1638–1658 – Peder Winstrup see below

In Sweden

- 1658–1679 – Peder Winstrup see above
- 1679–1687 – Canutus Hahn
- 1688–1694 – Christian Papke
- 1694–1714 – Mathias Steuchius
- 1715–1734 – Jonas Petri Linnerius
- 1734–1738 – Andreas Rydelius
- 1738–1740 – Carl Papke
- 1740–1747 – Henrik Benzelius
- 1748–1777 – Johan Engeström
- 1777–1794 – Olof Celsius the Younger
- 1794–1803 – Petrus Munck
- 1805–1811 – Nils Hesslén
- 1811–1854 – Wilhelm Faxe
- 1854–1856 – Henrik Reuterdahl
- 1856–1865 – Johan Henrik Thomander
- 1865–1897 – Wilhelm Flensburg
- 1898–1925 – Gottfrid Billing
- 1925–1948 – Edvard Rodhe
- 1949–1958 – Anders Nygren
- 1958–1960 – Nils Bolander
- 1960–1970 – Berndt Martin Lindström
- 1970–1980 – Olle Nivenius
- 1980–1992 – Per-Olov Ahrén
- 1992–1997 – Karl Gustav Hammar
- 1997–2007 – Christina Odenberg
- 2007–2014 – Antje Jackelén
- 2014–present – Johan Tyrberg
