= Anders Nygren =

Swedish theologian (1890–1978)

The Right Reverend Anders Nygren
- Bishop of Lund
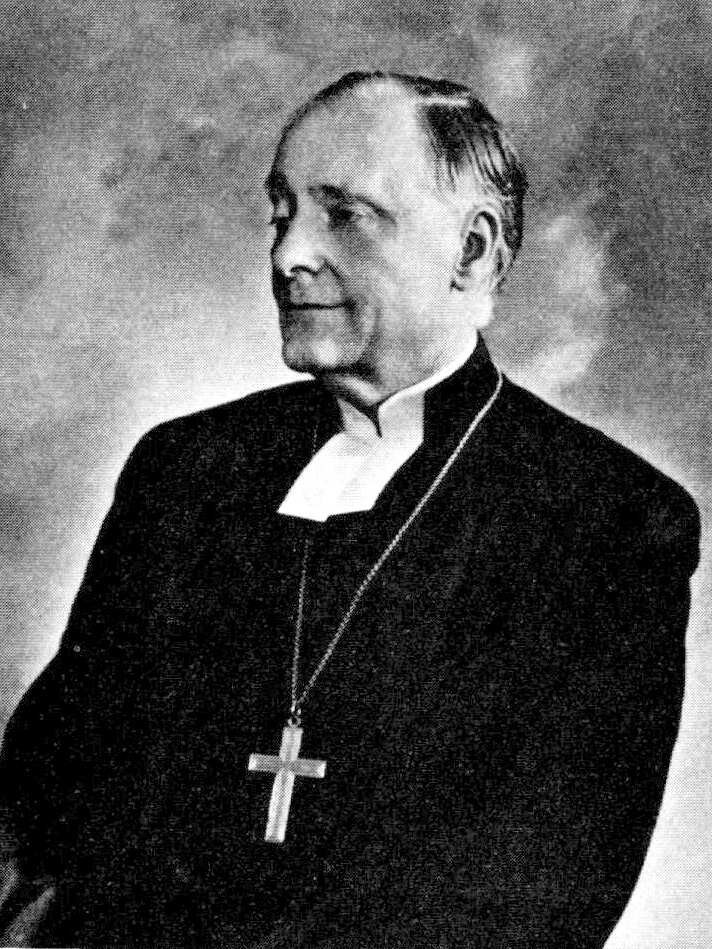
- Church: Church of Sweden
- Diocese: Lund
- Elected: 1949
- In office: 1949–1958
- Predecessor: Edvard Magnus Rodhe
- Successor: Nils Bolander

Orders
- Ordination: 3 June 1912
- Consecration: 22 May 1949 by Erling Eidem

Personal details
- Born: 15 November 1890 Gothenburg, Sweden
- Died: 20 October 1978 (aged 87) Lund, Sweden
- Buried: Norra cemetery, Lund
- Spouse: Irmgard Brandin
- Children: 4
- Education: Lund University

Anders Theodor Samuel Nygren (15 November 1890 – 20 October 1978) was a Swedish Lutheran theologian. He was professor of systematic theology at Lund University from 1924 and was elected Bishop of Lund in 1948 (emeritus 1958). He is best known for his two-volume work Agape and Eros (first published as Eros and Agape in Swedish in 1930–1936).

Nygren's approach, along with that of Gustaf Aulén, characterizes what is referred to as “Lundensian Theology”.

Nygren's observations about love are discussed at length in M. C. D'Arcy's The Mind And Heart Of Love: Lion And Unicorn, A Study In Eros And Agape, Faber and Faber, 1945.
