= Cecilia Uddén =

Swedish journalist, radio host and foreign reporter

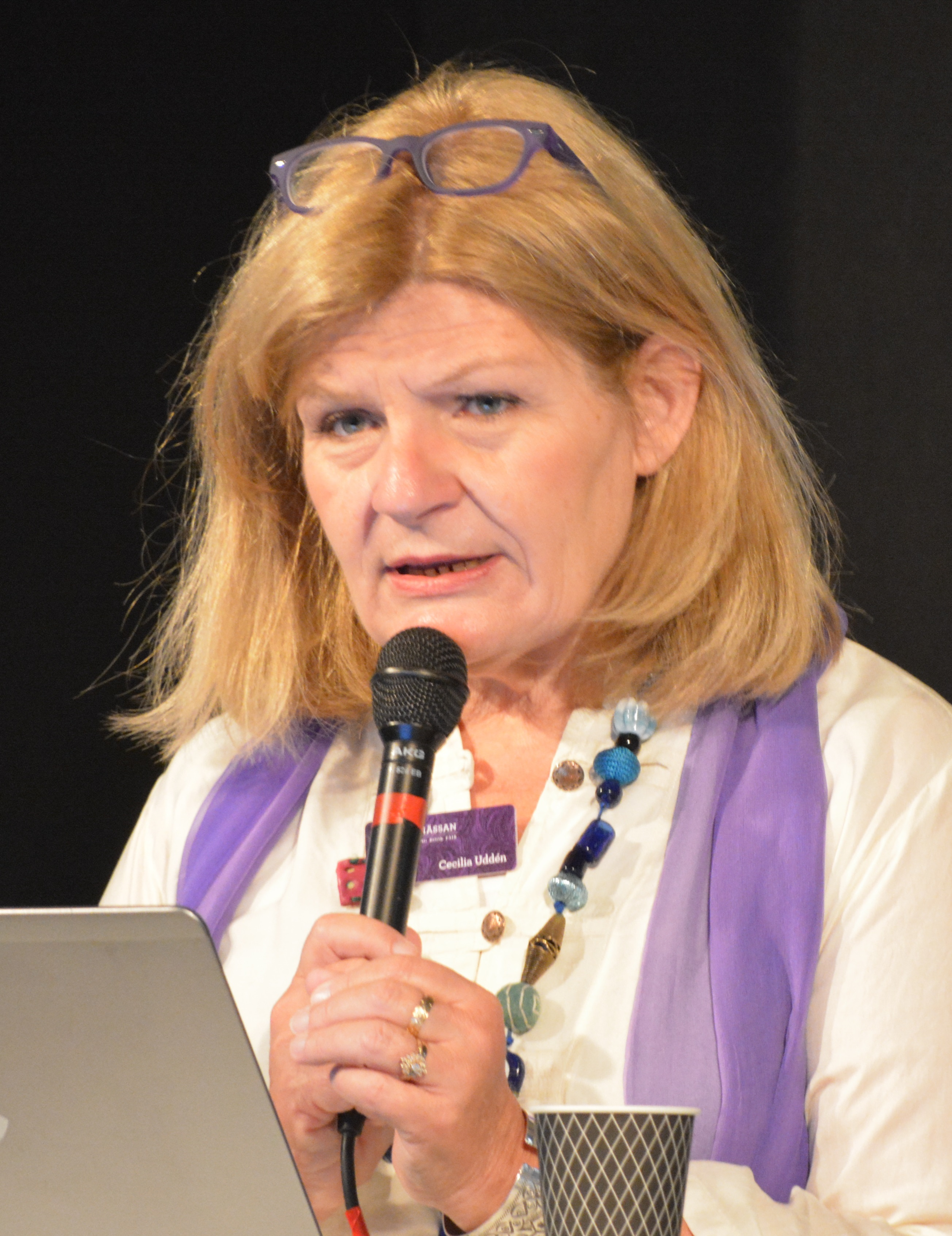
- Cecilia Uddén 2015
- Born: 28 October 1960 (age 65); Hägersten, Sweden
- Occupations: Journalist, radio host, reporter

Cecilia Uddén (born 28 October 1960) is a Swedish journalist, radio host and foreign reporter for Sveriges Radio. Uddén has worked as a radio foreign correspondent to the Middle East since 1993.

== Life ==
Cecilia Uddén was born in Hägersten, Stockholm, the oldest daughter of Per Olov Edvin Uddén and Sigrid Chatarina Öhlén-Johannsen. During her childhood, her family also spent time in Cairo, Egypt and Bangkok, Thailand. Uddén attended Norra Latins Gymnasium in Stockholm and studied philosophy at Stockholm University. She also studied journalism at Skurups folkhögskola in Skurup, Sweden. Uddén has two children with ex-husband Otto Manheimer, a cultural journalist and translator. She was in a relationship with artist and photographer Elisabeth Ohlson until her death in 2024.

== Career ==
In 1988, Uddén started working in Sveriges Radio's culture department. Between 1993 and 1998, she was a foreign correspondent to the Middle East and was based in Cairo and Jerusalem. Between 1998 and 2003, she was the foreign correspondent to Washington for Sveriges Radio. In 2004, she began to host the radio show Konflikt which was broadcast between 2004 and 2005. She worked as a foreign correspondent based in Amman from 2006 and 2011.

After the Syrian authorities withdrew permission for her to work as a journalist, stating that she had conveyed "false information", Uddén left Syria in December 2016. SR rejected the claims made against Uddén.

== Criticism ==
During the 2004 American presidential election, Uddén was criticised for making an evaluative statement about one of the candidates on Sveriges Radio. The comment was seen as a breach of impartiality, leading to the suspension of Uddén from election coverage.

Uddén was criticized in December 2011, by Peter Wolodarski in Dagens Nyheter after she posed for a photo with two salafists she had interviewed.

== Awards ==
- 1997: Stora Journalistpriset
- 2001: Sveriges Radios språkpris
- 2003: Jolopriset
- 2005: Torgny Segerstedts frihetspenna
- 2006: Vilhelm Moberg-priset
- 2010: Cordelia Edvardsonpriset
- 2011: Stora Journalistpriset
