= K. G. Hammar =

Archbishop Emeritus of Sweden (born 1943)

The Most Reverend Karl Gustav Hilding Hammar
- Archbishop Emeritus of Uppsala; Primate Emeritus of Sweden
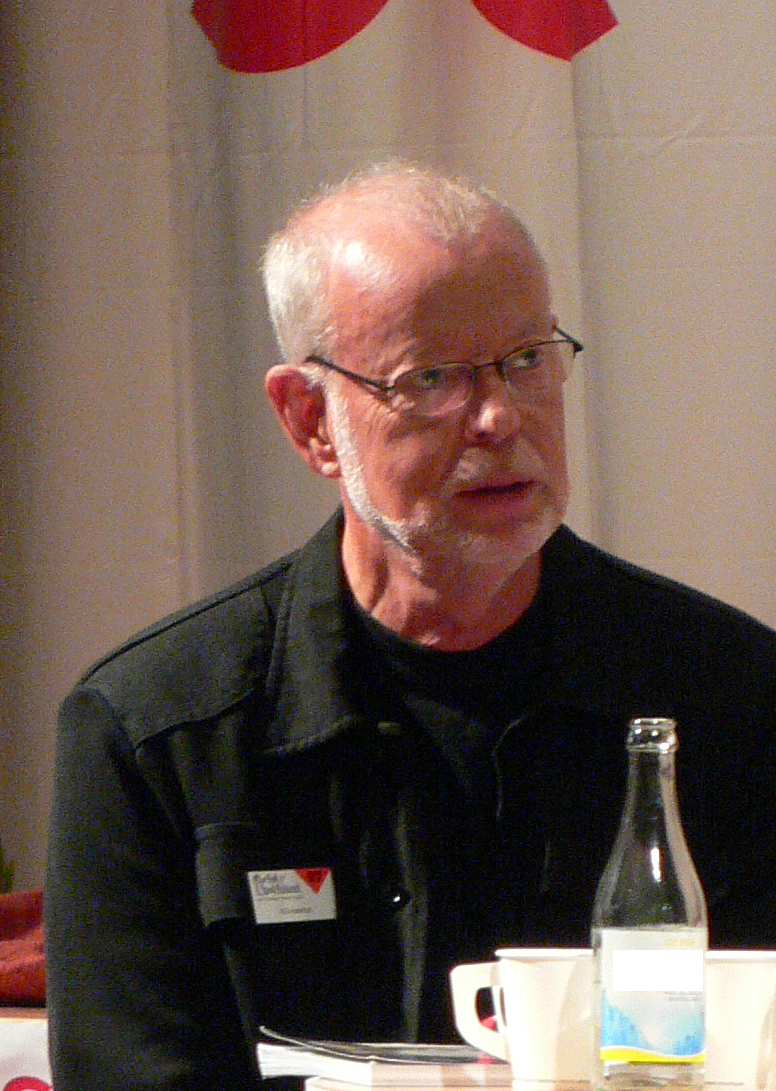
- Church: Church of Sweden
- Archdiocese: Uppsala
- Appointed: 1997
- In office: 1997–2006
- Predecessor: Gunnar Weman
- Successor: Anders Wejryd
- Previous post: Bishop of Lund (1992–1997)

Orders
- Ordination: 1965
- Consecration: 1992

Personal details
- Born: 18 February 1943 (age 83) Hässleholm, Sweden
- Education: Lund University
- Coat of arms

Karl Gustav Hilding Hammar (born 18 February 1943) is a Swedish clergyman. He was Archbishop of Uppsala, primate of the Church of Sweden, from 1997 to 2006. During his tenure as archbishop he was a highly divisive figure, who gained strong support from some and drew heavy criticism from others, and he oversaw the separation of church and state in Sweden on 1 January 2000. He holds a PhD and is the author of several books on theology.

== Career ==
His father a priest, he was ordained priest in the Diocese of Lund in 1965, at the age of 22. From 1972 to 1975 he worked as a teacher at Trinity Theological College in Singapore. He returned home to work as a priest in the Church of Sweden in Lund. In 1992, he became bishop and head of the diocese, and in 1997 he was appointed Archbishop by the Social Democrat-controlled Government of Sweden under the state church which was then still formally in place but lost its true standing already in 1958 and was on its way to be officially abolished. Soon after his appointment, he consecrated Christina Odenberg, the first Swedish woman to become a bishop.

== Theological and political positions ==
"I do not have the truth, I seek it" (Jag har inte sanningen, jag söker den) – K. G. Hammar

As the head of the church, he gained much popularity as well as criticism for his strong opinions, which emphasized humanism and tolerance according to his supporters, and was highly politically partisan and inappropriate for his position according to his critics, who saw him more as a left wing politician than a clergyman. He fought for extended amnesty for refugees and illegal immigrants in Sweden, debt relief for poor countries, more humane treatment of prisoners and tolerance towards followers of other religions than Christianity. He also criticised the invasion of Iraq and global capitalism, and urged for a boycott against goods from Israeli settlements. The former leader of the Swedish Christian Democrat party Alf Svensson has called Hammar a "leftist populist" and the then-party leader of the Moderate Party Bo Lundgren called on Hammar to either stop using his post as a political platform or to resign and stand for election as a leftist politician instead.

Hammar is an outspoken supporter of the Campaign for the Establishment of a United Nations Parliamentary Assembly, an organisation which advocates for democratic reformation of the United Nations, and the creation of a more accountable international political system.

Hammar also expressed liberal theological views and spoke out frequently for the rights of homosexuals to adopt children. He drew much fire for sanctioning the showing of the controversial photo exhibition Ecce Homo inside Uppsala Cathedral, where photos recreated classical Christian motifs but in contexts relating to homosexuality.

Hammar's liberal positions on several theological issues made him controversial among more conservative Christians. In an interview with Kyrkans Tidning, the Church of Sweden national magazine, he was quoted as saying: "You do not have to believe in anything particular to be a Christian. To say that you want to be part of it is enough. What kind of right do I have to question that? The definition frenzy only leads to exclusion", the context of the statement being how the church could open its door and welcome religious seekers and people who do not feel welcome in the church. He has also on other occasions stated that he thinks that the Virgin Birth should be interpreted as a "poetic statement" rather than a literal fact.

His views on homosexuality and controversial theological issues sometimes stirred emotions among other Christian denominations. For example, the Church of Sweden's rather new-founded ecumenical contacts with the Catholic Church and its old contacts with the Anglican Communion were strained for a while, but have since gone back to normal.

Hammar's theological position lies within a tradition of Christian mysticism and he has on several occasions expressed his gratitude to the writings of former U.N. Secretary-General Dag Hammarskjöld and his book Markings, and also to the Swedish poet laureate Tomas Tranströmer.

== Stepping down ==
On 25 August 2005 Hammar announced that he intended to step down from his post in the summer of 2006. He cited personal reasons, but declined to comment further.

K. G. Hammar became a widower in 2007. He remarried in 2014, and has five adult children.

== Bibliography ==
After the title follows an unofficial translation into English.

- (1975) Dialog i kyrkan (Dialogue in the Church)
- (1977) Gudsfolket, Ett bibelteologisk studium av kyrkans identitiet (The People of God—A Biblical Theological Study of the Identity of the Church)
- (1981) Prästidentitet och församlingssyn, Modeller för vägval (Clerical Identity and Views on Congregation—Models from which to Choose)
- (1985) Det som hörs – predikoteoretiska perspektiv (What can be heard—Sermon Theoretical Perspectives)
- (1993) Tecken och verklighet, Herdabrev till Lunds stift (Signs and Reality, Pastoral Letters to the Diocese of Lund)
- (1997) Samtal om Gud (Conversations About God)
- (2000) Ecce Homo – efter 2000 år (Ecce Homo—After 2000 Years)
- (2004) Jag har inte sanningen, jag söker den (I Do Not Have the Truth, I am Seeking It, with journalist Ami Lönnroth)
- (2019) The Way Chose You – meditations and reflections on Dag Hammarskjöld's Markings 2018 ISBN 9789163983467

Titles in Lutheranism
Preceded by Per-Olov Ahrén	Bishop of Lund; 1992–1997	Succeeded by Christina Odenberg
Preceded by Gunnar Weman	Archbishop of Uppsala; Lutheran Primate of Sweden; 1997–2006	Succeeded by Anders Wejryd
