= Simon May (philosopher) =

Simon Philip Walter May is visiting professor of philosophy at King's College, London, and at Birkbeck College, University of London.

== Selected publications ==
- Jump! A New Philosophy for Conquering Procrastination. Basic Books, 2025.
- How to Be a Refugee. Picador, 2021
- Love: A History. Yale University Press, 2011.
- Nietzsche's Ethics and his War on "Morality". Oxford University Press, 1999.
- Nietzsche's On the Genealogy of Morality: A Critical Guide. Cambridge University Press, 2011. (Editor)
- Nietzsche on Freedom and Autonomy. Oxford University Press, 2009. (Edited with Ken Gemes)
- Thinking Aloud: A Collection of Aphorisms. Alma Books, 2009.
