= Gustaf Aulén =

Swedish bishop and Lutheran theologian (1879–1977)

The Right Reverend Gustaf Aulén
- Bishop of Strängnäs
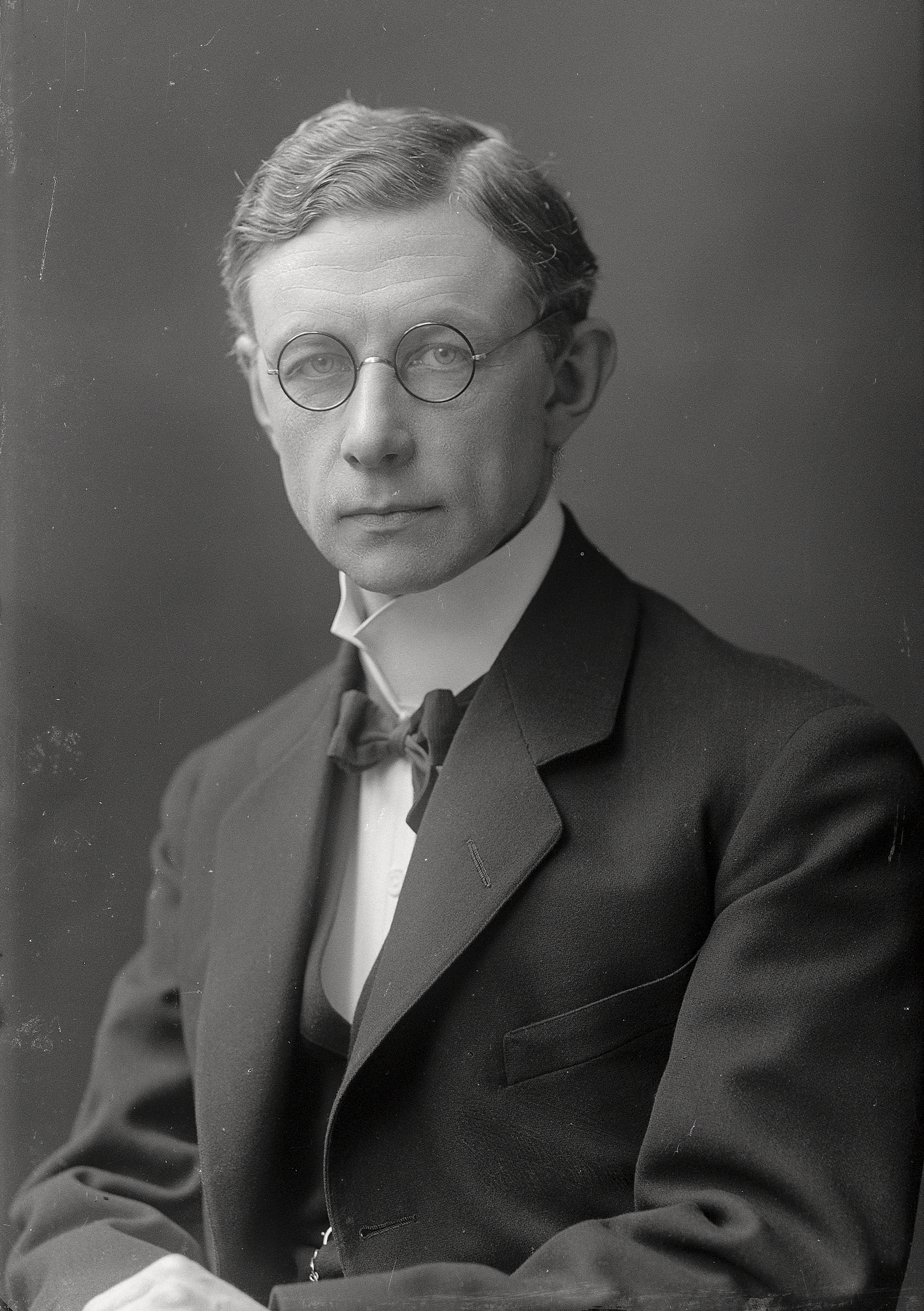
- Aulén in 1924
- Church: Church of Sweden
- Diocese: Strängnäs
- In office: 1933–1952
- Predecessor: Sam Stadener
- Successor: Dick Helander

Personal details
- Born: Gustaf Emanuel Hildebrand Aulén; 15 May 1879 Ljungby, Sweden
- Died: 16 December 1977 (aged 98)
- Buried: Norra Kyrkogården, Lund
- Denomination: Swedish Lutheran
- Parents: Frans Johan Aulén (b. Petersson) (1847 - 1904) and Ebba Maria Lovisa Matilda Aulén (b. Hildebrand) (1850 - 1891)
- Spouse: Kristine Bjørnstad (1882-1959)
- Children: Johan Olof Hildebrand Aulén (1910 - 1913) Agnes Ingegerd Maria Aulén (1912 - ) Gustav Einar Hildebrand Aulén (1914 - 1947) Bengt Olof (Boa) Aulén (1921 - 2000). Boa was father to ornithologist, Bengt Gustaf Aulén (b.1950)
- Occupation: Priest, theologian and later bishop
- Education: University of Uppsala

Gustaf Emanuel Hildebrand Aulén (15 May 1879 – 16 December 1977) was the Bishop of Strängnäs in the Church of Sweden, a Lutheran theologian, and the author of Christus Victor, a work which still exerts considerable influence on contemporary theological thinking on the atonement.

== Life ==
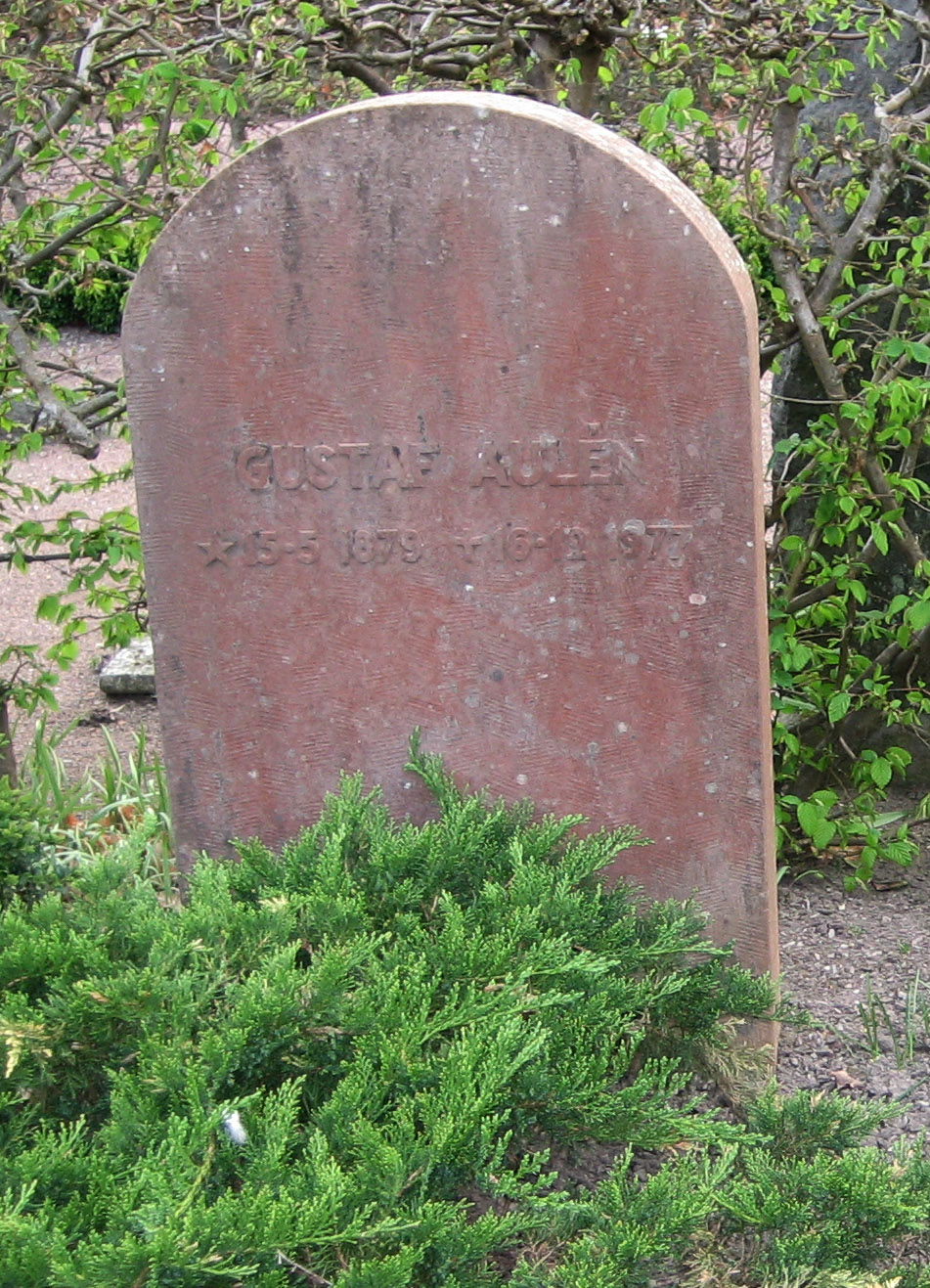
Gustaf Aulén's grave in Lund, Sweden

Aulén was born in 1879 in Ljungby parish, Kalmar County, Sweden to Rev. Johan Aulén and Maria Hildebrand. He married a Norwegian woman, Kristine Bjørnstad in 1907. After studying at Uppsala University, Aulén became professor of dogmatics at Lund University in 1913, then Bishop of Strängnäs in 1933.

Aulén wrote a huge amount of material in his lifetime and his most famous work –Christus Victor – was published in Swedish in 1930, with an English translation in 1931. His other most well read book, The Faith of the Christian Church was published in six different editions in Swedish. The fourth edition, from 1943, was the first to be translated into English in 1948. Aulén's work gained international recognition and most of his later works were quickly followed by English translations.

Aulén was also an avid composer and was heavily involved in the committee responsible for the Swedish Church's new hymn book published in 1937. Aulén composed the music for the hymn Fädernas kyrka. He was the president of the Royal Swedish Academy of Music 1944–1950.

Aulén retired from his bishopric in 1952 and returned to Lund to focus on his academic work. He outlived his wife, who died in 1959. In 1975, he published his autobiography, My Ninety-Six Years: Happenings and Thoughts, and died two years later on 16 December 1977 at the age of 98.

== Theology ==
Aulén was a prominent member of the 'Lundensian' school of theology, along with Anders Nygren, Ragnar Bring and Gustaf Wingren. The Lundensian school perhaps resembles most closely neo-orthodoxy in the German and English-speaking theological scenes of the mid-20th century. It was also a via media that largely rejected 19th German liberal thought whilst it simultaneously embraced orthodoxy, though not without criticism.

Two significant influences on Aulén's thinking were Martin Luther, whose work Aulén consistently praises, and Friedrich Schleiermacher, of whom Aulén is much more frequently critical.

=== Christus Victor ===
Aulén's most influential contribution to Theology was in the area of Atonement theory. His book Christus Victor has established itself as one of the key reference points in contemporary discussion. The original Swedish title of the book was Den Kristna Försoningstanken(EN: The Christian Idea of Reconciliation) but his English translator, A. Gabriel Hebert gave it the title Christus Victor. In his autobiography Aulén said he preferred Hebert's title.

Aulén identified three main theories of the Atonement: the 'objective' view, epitomised by Anselm of Canterbury (known as Satisfaction theory); the 'subjective' view, epitomised by Peter Abelard (known as Moral Exemplar theory); and what he referred to as the 'classic' view.

Aulén advocated a return to this 'classic' view, which he characterised as follows:

Its central theme is the idea of the Atonement as a Divine conflict and victory; Christ – Christus Victor – fights against and triumphs over the evil powers of the world, the 'tyrants' under which mankind is in bondage and suffering, and in Him God reconciles the world to Himself.

He argued that both other theories placed too much emphasis on humanity's role in the Atonement: the Moral Exemplar view entirely so, and the Satisfaction Theory in its focus on "the service which Christ qua homo renders."

Regardless of whether they agree with his arguments, most contemporary discussions of the Atonement follow Aulén's three categories, and the term Christus Victor has become synonymous with the 'classic' view he advocated.

== Studies and career ==
- Uppsala University:
  - Candidate of Philosophy 1899
  - Licenciate of Theology 1906
  - Doctor of Theology 1915
  - Lecturer of Theological Encyclopedia 1907
  - Lecturer of Dogmatism 1910
- Lund University:
  - Professor of Systematic Theology 1913
- Bishop of the Diocese of Strängnäs 1933

== Selected bibliography of works in English ==
- The Faith of the Christian Church. Swedish: 1923, 1924, 1931, 1943 (English: 1948), 1957 (English: 1960), 1965
- Christus Victor: A Historical Study of the Three Main Types of the Idea of Atonement. Swedish: 1930, English: 1931
- Church, Law and Society. Scribner, 1948
- Eucharist and Sacrifice. Swedish: 1956, English: 1958
- Reformation and Catholicity. Swedish: 1959, English: 1961
- The Drama and the Symbols. Swedish: 1965, English: 1970
- Dag Hammarskjöld's White Book: An Analysis of 'Markings'. English: 1970
- Jesus in Contemporary Historical Research. Swedish: 1976, English: 1976

== See also ==
- Samfundet Nordens Frihet, where Aulén was a board member
