= LGBTQ bishops =

List of openly LGBTQ bishops

This article largely discusses presence of openly lesbian, gay, bisexual, and transgender and queer bishops in churches governed under episcopal polities. The existence of LGBTQ bishops in the Anglican, Catholic, Lutheran, Methodist and other traditions is a matter of historical record, though never, until recently, were LGBTQ clergy and bishops ordained by any of the main Christian denominations. Homosexual activity was engaged in secretly. When it was made public, official response ranged from suspension of sacramental duties to laicisation.

The higher prominence given today to the presence of LGBTQ clergy, including bishops, in the life of the church reflects broader issues, both socially and ecclesiologically (see List of Christian denominational positions on homosexuality), concerning issues of social tolerance and the relationship between social change and doctrinal development. The issue has attracted greater attention in recent years following the development of the gay rights movement, and the increasing discussion within some Christian churches over the inclusion of gay clergy in senior positions.

== Historical context ==
It was customary in the past for individuals – whether clergy or not – to remain secretive (in the closet) about their sexual orientation and activity. This was mainly because there was generally low tolerance for homosexuality across society, and those caught faced severe criminal sanctions (often including death). Nor is it straightforward to identify individuals before the 19th century as homosexual or "gay" in the modern sense of the word.

Nevertheless, as far back as the sixth century (CE) the Greek chronicler John Malalas wrote about Isaiah, Bishop of Rhodes and Alexander, Bishop of Diospolis in Thracia who had been punished by the Prefect of Thrace (Victor) for "homosexual practices". Isaiah was tortured severely and exiled, while Alexander had his genitals amputated and was subsequently paraded around the city on a litter. As a result, the Emperor Justinian decreed that all caught for pederasty should have their genitals amputated. Many homosexual men were arrested in the wake of this, and died from their injuries. An atmosphere of fear followed.

In the eleventh century, Ralph, Archbishop of Tours in France had his lover Jean installed as Bishop of Orléans in France. Neither Pope Urban II, nor his successor Paschal II took action to depose either man from the episcopacy.

Baldric of Dol (c. 1050 – 1130), abbot of Bourgueil and subsequently Bishop of Dol-en-Bretagne in France, wrote passionate letters to a man simply called "Walter": "If you wish to take up lodging with me, I will divide my heart and breast with you. I will share with you anything of mine that can be divided; If you command it, I will share my very soul."

Several of the poems of Marbodius of Rennes (died 1123), Bishop of Rennes in France, speak of handsome boys and homosexual desires although stop short of consummating physical relationships (An Argument Against Copulation Between People of Only One Sex). Poems, such as the one where he sent an urgent demand that his beloved return if he wished the speaker to remain faithful to him, have been interpreted to indicate that more than poetic invention was involved.

After the reformation in the Roman Catholic Church, public scandal touched upon the fondness of Cardinal Scipione Borghese (Archbishop of Bologna) for Cardinal Stefano Pignatelli (his likely lover). In the 16th century in Italy, Pope Julius III (Bishop of Rome) was rumoured to have a romantic relationship with a teenage boy named Innocenzo. In the 18th century notable examples of emotional and perhaps romantic relationships among bishops include Cardinal Henry Benedict Stuart and Archbishop of Genoa Giovanni Lercari.

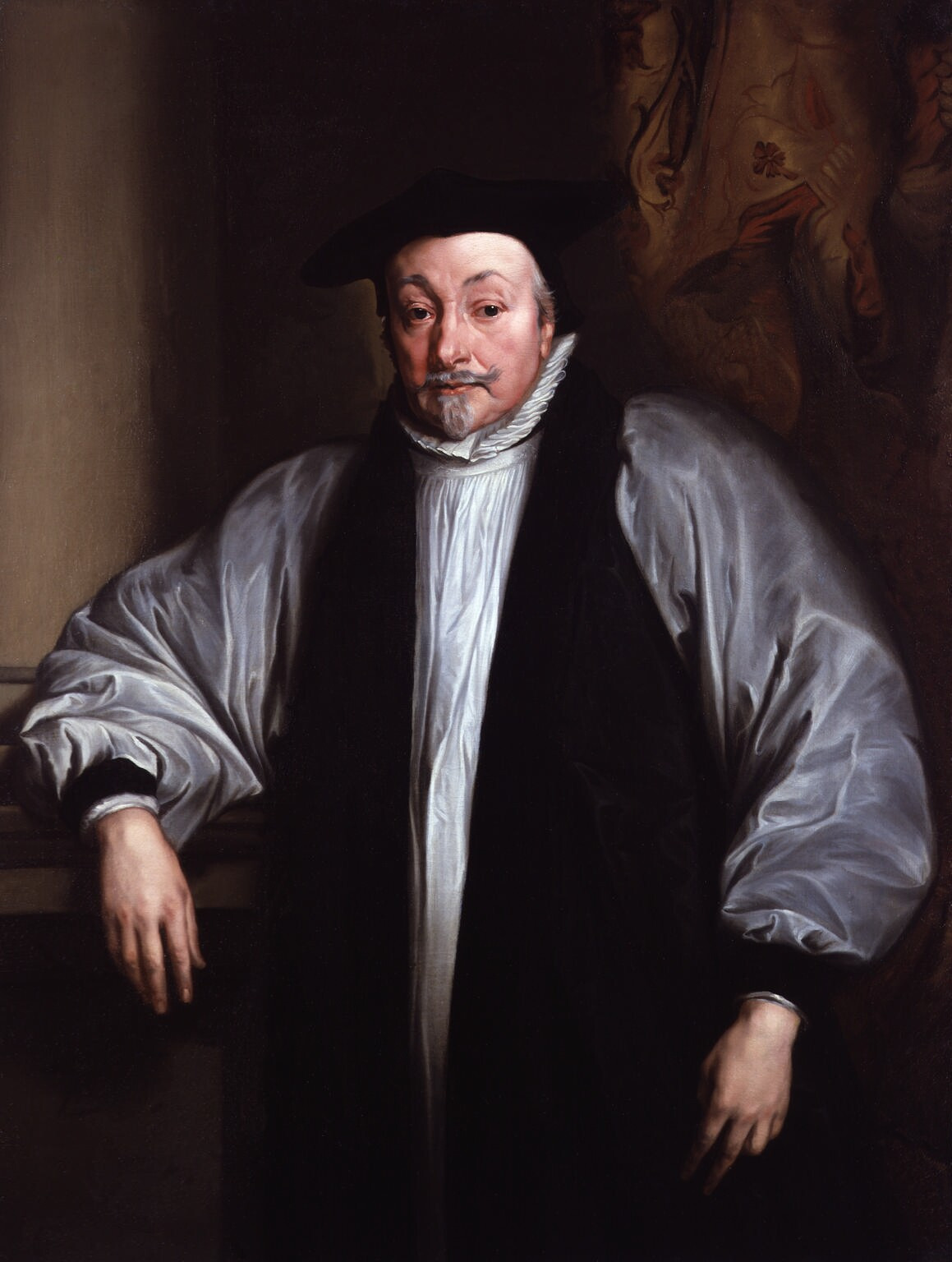
William Laud, Archbishop of Canterbury (died 1645)

In the Anglican Communion, John Whitgift, Archbishop of Canterbury in England (1583–1604), formed a close relationship with Andrew Perne while at university in Cambridge. Perne went on to live with Whitgift in his old age. Puritan satirists would later mock Whitgift as "Perne's boy" who was willing to carry his cloak-bag – thus suggesting that the two had enjoyed a homosexual relationship. William Laud (died 1645), also Archbishop of Canterbury, managed homosexual leanings discreetly, but confided his erotic dreams about the Duke of Buckingham and others to a private diary. In the 19th century Cardinal John Henry Newman remained close to Ambrose St. John and was attacked by contemporaries for his "lack of masculinity". The two were buried in the same grave.

John Atherton (1598–1640) served from 1634 as Bishop of Waterford and Lismore in the Church of Ireland. In 1640 Atherton was accused of buggery with a man, John Childe, his steward and tithe proctor. They were tried under a law that Atherton himself had helped to institute. They were both condemned to death, and Atherton was executed in Stephen's Green, Dublin. Reportedly, he confessed to the crime immediately before his execution, although he had proclaimed his innocence before that.

== Modern day ==
=== Anglican Communion ===
==== US Episcopal Church ====
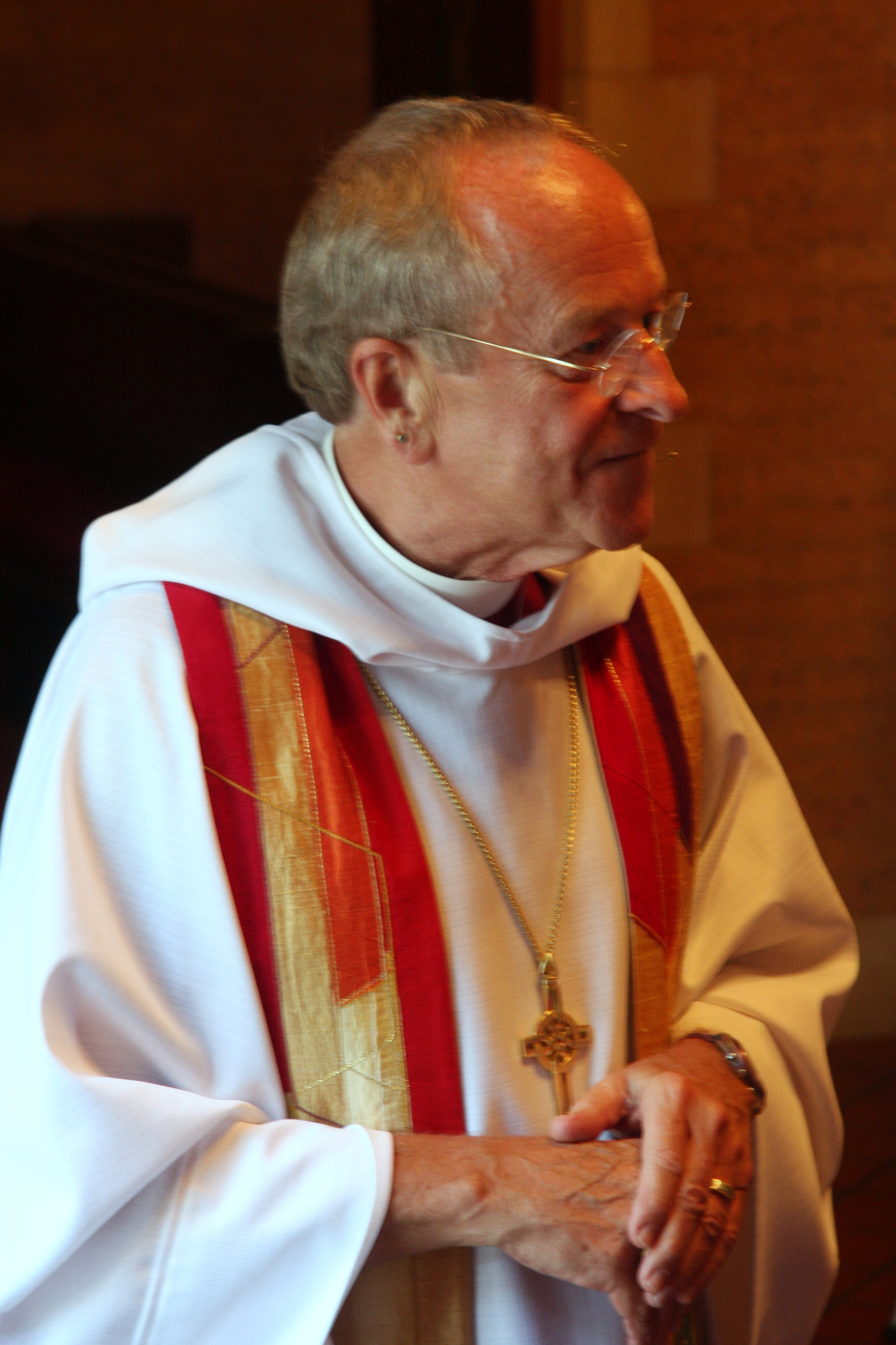
Gene Robinson, former Bishop of New Hampshire

It is in contemporary Anglicanism that the issue of homosexuality and its relationship to people in the episcopate has been confronted openly. Indeed, the first large mainstream church to ever consecrate an openly gay bishop who was not celibate has been the Episcopal Church in the United States of America, a member of the Anglican Communion, who consecrated Gene Robinson diocesan bishop of the Diocese of New Hampshire in 2003.

Robinson was elected bishop coadjutor in 2003 and succeeded as diocesan bishop in March 2004. Before becoming bishop, he served as Canon to the Ordinary to the VIII Bishop of New Hampshire. His sexual orientation was privately acknowledged in the 1970s, when he studied in seminary, was ordained, married, and started a family. He went public with his sexual identity and divorced in 1986. He entered a formal relationship with his second partner, Mark Andrew, in 1988. When delegates to the Episcopal convention were voting on the ratification of his election, it became an issue of controversy. His election was ratified 62 to 45. After his election, many theologically conservative Episcopalians in the United States abandoned the Episcopal Church, formed the Anglican Church in North America (ACNA) and aligned themselves with bishops outside the Episcopal Church in the United States, a process called the Anglican realignment.

There have been documented cases of other openly gay Anglican bishops, however. The first bishop to come out as gay was the US Episcopal bishop Otis Charles, who did so soon after his retirement in 1993. He subsequently divorced from his wife. He had been a bishop in Utah from 1971 to 1993, and after coming out became vocal in his support for LGBT rights while remaining a member of the Episcopal House of Bishops. In 1999 he was arrested and escorted away in handcuffs after a protest at the Episcopal church national convention against the church's historical treatment of gay people. He went on to legally marry his partner, Felipe Sanchez-Paris in 2008.

Mary Glasspool, who is openly gay and lives with her partner of 20 years, was elected as a suffragan bishop in the Episcopal Diocese of Los Angeles in December 2009 and was consecrated on 15 May 2010. Her election has attracted worldwide attention, including an expression of concern from the Archbishop of Canterbury, Rowan Williams. In response to expressions of concern that her election would be viewed as a threat to the cohesion of the Anglican Communion, Glasspool said, "I've committed my life as a life of service to the people of Jesus Christ, and what hurts is the sense that anybody might have that my name or my servanthood could be perceived as divisive." In 2015, Glasspool accepted the invitation to serve the Episcopal Diocese of New York, where she has been serving as an assistant bishop since 2016.

Bishop Thomas Shaw of Massachusetts, a celibate monk who previously served as superior of the Society of St. John the Evangelist, discussed his experiences as a gay monk, priest, and bishop in the 2012 documentary Love Free or Die, about Robinson's election. A longtime supporter of the full inclusion of gays and lesbians in the church, he had avoided broaching the subject of his own sexuality because as a monk "he did not want to send the message that, as some conservatives argue, gay people should be celibate." Bp Shaw died of cancer in 2014, one month after his successor was consecrated.

Bishop Thomas James Brown was consecrated the 10th bishop of the Episcopal Diocese of Maine on 22 June 2019. He is married to Thomas Mousin, who is also an ordained priest in the church.

Bishop Bonnie A. Perry was elected to be the 11th Episcopal Bishop of the Episcopal Diocese of Michigan and ordained on 8 February 2020 at the Ford Community & Performing Arts Center in Dearborn, Michigan. Perry will become the first woman bishop as well as the first lesbian bishop in the diocese since it was formed in 1836. She is married to her partner, Susan Harlow, who is an ordained United Church of Christ pastor.

Bishop Deon K. Johnson was elected on 23 November 2019. His ordination will take place on Saturday, 25 April, at St. Stanislaus Polish Catholic Church in St. Louis. He is married to Jhovanny Osorio-Vázquez Johnson.

==== Church of England ====
In 1993, Peter Ball resigned from his position as Bishop of Gloucester after admitting to an act of gross indecency with a 19-year-old man. In October 2015, Ball was sentenced to 32 months' imprisonment for misconduct in public office and indecent assault after admitting the abuse of 18 young men over a period of 15 years from 1977 to 1992.

In 1994, the gay rights campaign group OutRage!, led by Peter Tatchell, began to concentrate on religious homophobia. It was revealed in the press that the new Bishop of Durham, Michael Turnbull, had a conviction for a gay sex offence and OutRage! disrupted his ordination ceremony. There were other bishops known or suspected to be gay in private and OutRage! held a demonstration outside Church House in London naming ten bishops and urging them to "Tell the truth!" Although the ten bishops were not named in the British press, their names were published in an Australian gay newspaper, the Melbourne Star Observer, and has since been published on the internet. They included Timothy Bavin (Bishop of Portsmouth), Brother Michael (Fisher) (assistant bishop, Ely), John Klyberg (Bishop suffragan of Fulham), Michael Marshall (assistant bishop, London), Brian Masters (area Bishop of Edmonton), John Neill (assistant bishop, Bath & Wells), Jack Nicholls (Bishop suffragan of Lancaster), Mervyn Stockwood (assistant bishop, Bath & Wells) and Michael Turnbull (Bishop of Durham). However, OutRage produced no evidence for any of its claims.

At the same time, Tatchell began a dialogue with the Bishop of London, David Hope, who had not been named as the group thought that he could be persuaded to come out voluntarily. Press stories speculating about the personal sexuality of bishops led Hope to fear the worst and he called a press conference in February 1995 at which he denounced OutRage! for putting him under pressure. While admitting that his sexuality was "a grey area", he had "sought to lead a celibate life" and was "perfectly happy and content".

Mervyn Stockwood, who was gay, was bishop of the Anglican Diocese of Southwark, but also celibate. He even gently rebuked a parish priest for initiating the blessing of same-sex unions in the late 1970s.

Appointed as the suffragan Bishop of Edmonton (London) in 1999, Peter Wheatley is gay and has been living with his partner saying that he is "a celibate Christian living by Christian teachings". This does not appear to have generated any significant controversy. Bishop Wheatley is opposed to the ordination of women to the episcopate.

In 2003, Jeffrey John, at the time Canon Chancellor and Theologian of Southwark Cathedral, was chosen to be the Bishop of Reading (a suffragan of the Bishop of Oxford). John has been in a relationship with another male priest for many years, though he also says that their relationship is celibate. As a result of the ensuing controversy, however, John withdrew his acceptance of the appointment. He was subsequently appointed Dean of St Albans. John again emerged in the debate over gay bishops in July 2010 following widespread media reports that he was the Crown Nomination Commission's preferred candidate for appointment by the Queen as Bishop of Southwark though subsequent reports suggested that this was not the case or that his name had been rejected following leaking of the proposal.

In 2013, it was announced that the Church of England's House of Bishops had approved plans to allow gay men to become appointed as bishops if they were celibate, including those such as Jeffrey John who are in civil partnerships.

In 2016, Bishop Nicholas Chamberlain, the bishop of Grantham in the diocese of Lincoln, announced he was gay and in a same-sex partnership becoming the first bishop to do so in the Church of England. Archbishop Justin Welby announced that he was aware of Chamberlain's sexual orientation and celibate same-sex relationship prior to his consecration as bishop, noting that his sexual orientation was "irrelevant" due to his adherence to the bishops' guidance on sexuality.

==== Anglican Church of Southern Africa ====
Bishop Merwyn Castle was consecrated Bishop of False Bay (a suffragan of the diocese of Cape Town) in 1994, but because most Anglicans outside South Africa were unaware of his homosexuality, and because he was celibate, no comparable controversy took place. The Anglican Church of Southern Africa has no official position on homosexuality.

==== Scottish Episcopal Church ====
In 1995, Bishop Derek Rawcliffe, retired Bishop of Glasgow and Galloway in the Scottish Episcopal Church, disclosed his homosexuality. Like Terry Brown (see below), Rawcliffe had also served as a bishop in Melanesia.

==== Church of Melanesia ====
Bishop Terry Brown, of Malaita in the Solomon Islands, attended the 1998 Lambeth Conference (which declared same-sex relationships "incompatible with Scripture") as an openly gay man (he also attended the 2008 Lambeth Conference).

==== Anglican Church of Canada ====
Barry Hollowell, who resigned as Bishop of Calgary in the Anglican Church of Canada in 2005, came out publicly in 2008 after the death of his wife, who had been aware of his sexual orientation at the time of his election to the episcopate. In 2016, the Anglican Diocese of Toronto elected as a suffragan bishop, an openly gay and partnered priest, Kevin Robertson. He was consecrated on 7 January 2017 as Bishop of York-Scarborough.

==== Church in Wales ====
In 2020, the Church in Wales consecrated Cherry Vann, who is in a same-sex civil partnership, as the Bishop of Monmouth. In 2025, she was elected as the next Archbishop of Wales, the first openly gay primate in the Anglican Communion.

In 2024, the sitting Archbishop of Wales appointed David Morris as the Assistant Bishop of Bangor. Morris is in a same-sex relationship, engaged to his fiancé, and was consecrated by bishops from the Church in Wales and the Church of England.

=== Roman Catholic Church ===
Bishop Thomas Gumbleton, a retired Catholic bishop in the Diocese of Detroit, has consistently been a supporter of New Ways Ministry and has also called for homosexual priests and bishops to "come out" and be truthful to themselves and others. Gumbleton has acted as a keynote speaker at Call to Action conferences. In 1995 he wore a mitre at a church service on which were symbols of the cross, a rainbow and a pink triangle in solidarity with the gay community. Later, he came into the public eye before the Vatican's Instruction with regard to the ordination of homosexual men was released, arguing against Andrew R. Baker's article on the issue in America.

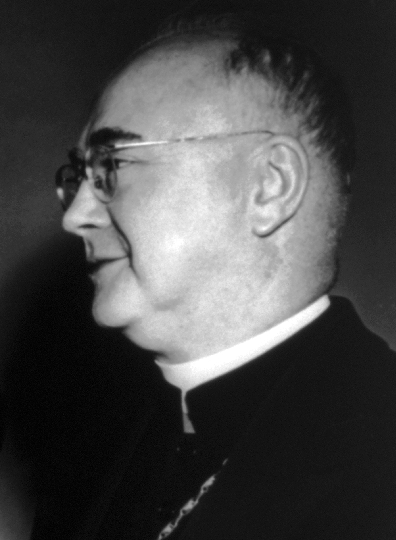
Cardinal Francis Spellman

Francis Spellman, Cardinal Archbishop of New York, was long rumored to have been gay, according to a book by John Cooney, who said that many whom he interviewed took his homosexuality for granted. In addition, a book published in 1998 claims that during the Second World War, Spellman was carrying on a relationship with a chorus boy in the Broadway revue One Touch of Venus. Spellman defended Senator Joseph McCarthy's 1953 investigations of subversives and homosexuals in the federal government.

In 1998, Cardinal Hans Hermann Groër was removed from office by Pope John Paul II for alleged sexual misconduct with younger men who were students in his care. Officially, the Pope accepted the resignation letter which Groër had written on the occasion of his 75th birthday. This made Groër, who had adamantly refused to ever comment in public on the allegations, one of the highest-ranking Catholic clerics to become caught up in the sexual abuse scandals.

Archbishop Rembert Weakland of Milwaukee, Wisconsin, retired on 24 May 2002 following the revelation that he had used $450,000 in archdiocesan funds to settle a lawsuit accusing him of sexual harassment. In a statement one week later, he admitted the falsity of his previous assertion that income he had earned outside of his priestly occupation (and turned over to the Church) exceeded the $450,000. In 2009 he confirmed that he was gay, but did not reveal any details of his relationships.

The auxiliary Roman Catholic Bishop of Cape Town, South Africa, Reginald Cawcutt, resigned in July 2002 following allegations that he outed himself as gay on a sometimes-sexually charged website set up for gay priests. Bishop Reginald Cawcutt blamed the scandal on the conservative US organization Roman Catholic Faithful which infiltrated the now closed website, called St. Sebastian's Angels, and traced posting addresses.

In 2005, Juan Carlos Maccarone, the Bishop of Santiago del Estero in Argentina was forced to resign after images were released of him engaged in sexual activity with another man. Suggestion was made that the former state governor Carlos Juarez had been involved in the release after criticism of the governor's human rights record.

Francisco Domingo Barbosa Da Silveira, the Bishop of Minas in Uruguay, was forced to resign in July 2009, following a gay sex scandal in which he had faced extortion.

In February 2013, Cardinal Keith O'Brien, leader of the Catholic Church in Scotland, was forced to resign as archbishop three months ahead of planned retirement because of allegations of inappropriate acts with four priests during the 1980s, but also more recently. O'Brien had been a vocal critic of the UK Government's plans to introduce same-sex marriage.

In October 2016, a group in favour of same-sex marriage in Mexico called the Pride National Front (FON) alleged that a number of Catholic leaders were homosexual. The list included Hipólito Reyes Larios, Archbishop of Xalapa in Veracruz.

=== Lutheranism ===
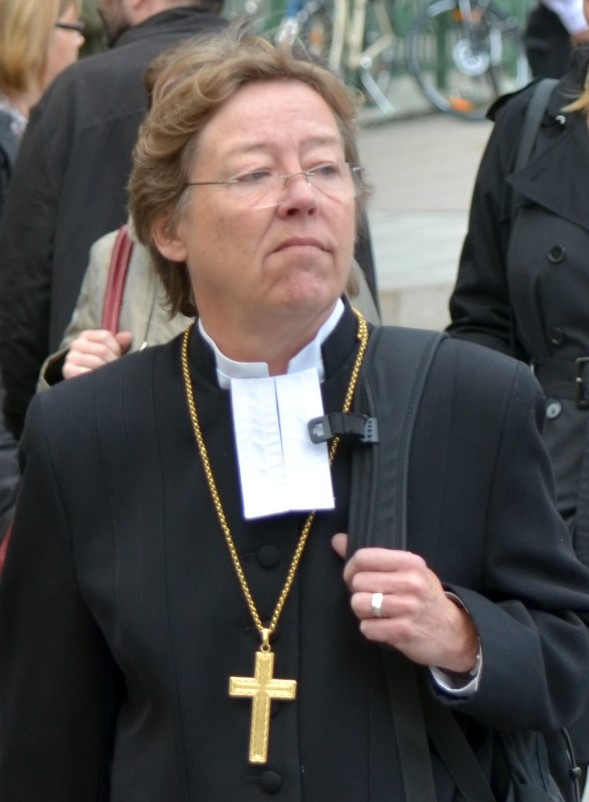
Eva Brunne, world's first openly lesbian bishop

In 1993 lesbian Norway bishop Rosemarie Köhn was ordained. She was married with Susanne Sønderbo. In 2008 the gay German priest Horst Gorski was nominated for election as a bishop in the North Elbian Evangelical Lutheran Church, Germany. He lost against Gerhard Ulrich. In 2015, however, Gorski became the first homosexual to serve as head of office for the United Evangelical Lutheran Church of Germany (VELKD) and vice-president of the Evangelical Church in Germany (EKD).

In May 2009 the Diocese of Stockholm in the Church of Sweden elected Eva Brunne as its bishop. She won the vote by 413 votes to 365 and officially succeeded Bishop Caroline Krook in November 2009. Brunne is married to her partner, Gunilla Linden, who is a priest and with whom she has a son. Brunne is believed to be the world's first openly lesbian bishop.

Following her appointment, Brunne said: "I am happy and very proud to be part of a church that encourages people to make their own decisions." She added: "Diversity is a big wealth."

In May 2013, the Evangelical Lutheran Church in America (ELCA) elected its first openly gay bishop, Bishop Guy Erwin, to office as the bishop of the Southwest California Synod.

In 2015 the Church of Sweden elected Mikael Mogren as bishop of Västerås, and thus got their first openly gay male bishop. He came out publicly as gay in one of his books published in 2013, without much public attention to the fact neither then nor at the time of his election. In one of the interviews following the election that mentioned his orientation, Mogren explained that he is "not a single-issue party".

Also in 2015, bishop Kevin Kanouse, a bishop in the ELCA, came out as gay.

On 8 May 2021, Sierra Pacific Synod of the Evangelical Lutheran Church in America (ELCA) elected the Reverend Doctor Megan Rohrer the first openly transgender bishop, the first in any major Christian denomination. She was installed 11 September 2021.

On 5 June 2021, lesbian ELCA bishop Brenda Bos was elected.

=== United Methodist Church ===
Jeanne Audrey Powers was the first woman to be nominated for the office of a bishop in The United Methodist Church. In 1995, the year before she retired, she came out as a lesbian during a sermon she delivered at the national gathering of the Reconciling Ministries Movement.

In 2016, the Western Jurisdiction of the United Methodist Church elected its first openly gay and partnered bishop. Before being elected, Bishop Karen Oliveto had served as senior pastor of Glide Memorial Church in San Francisco. Earlier in 2016, the New York Annual Conference of the United Methodist Church had ordained the denomination's first openly LGBT clergy. At the United Methodist Church's General Conference, the delegates voted in favour of a motion to defer the issue of human sexuality to the Council of Bishops to reexamine the Book of Discipline.

On 7 May 2018 the Council of Bishops in the United Methodist Church proposed allowing individual pastors and regional church bodies to decide whether to ordain LGBT clergy and perform same-sex weddings, though this proposal can only be approved by the General Conference.

In 2022, the Western Jurisdiction elected a second openly gay and partnered bishop, Cedrick Bridgeforth.

In 2024, the UMC elected with Kristin Stoneking a third openly gay married bishop.

== See also ==
- LGBTQ clergy in Christianity
