= Flemingsberg Church =

Church in Flemingsberg, Sweden

Coordinates: 59.22346040712403°N 17.939107661100362°E

- Flemingsbergs kyrka
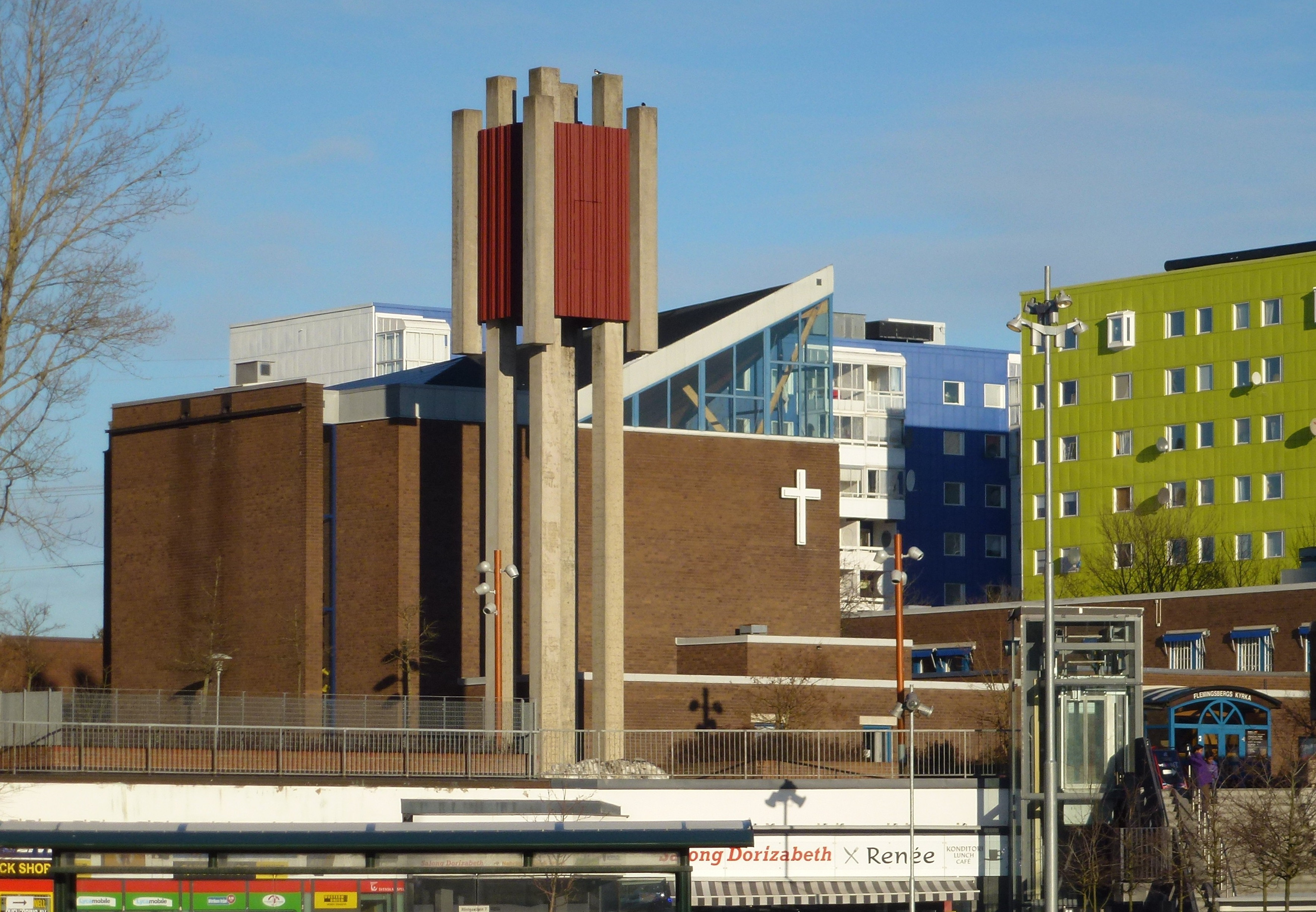
- Flemingsberg Church in February 2013.
- Flemingsberg Church
- Country: Sweden
- Denomination: Church of Sweden

History
- Consecrated: 1976

Architecture
- Architect: Gunnar Cedervall

Administration
- Diocese: Stockholm

Flemingsberg Church (Swedish: Flemingsbergs kyrka) is a church building in Flemingsberg, Huddinge, Sweden that is part of the Church of Sweden.

== History ==
The church and its parish house were built in connection with the construction of a new city centre in Flemingsberg in the mid-1970s. The church was designed by architect Gunnar Cedervall. It was consecrated on 26 September 1976 by the Bishop of Stockholm, Ingmar Ström.
