= Holy orders =

Sacraments in some Christian churches

The ordination of a priest in the Church of Sweden by Evangelical-Lutheran bishop Andreas Holmberg.

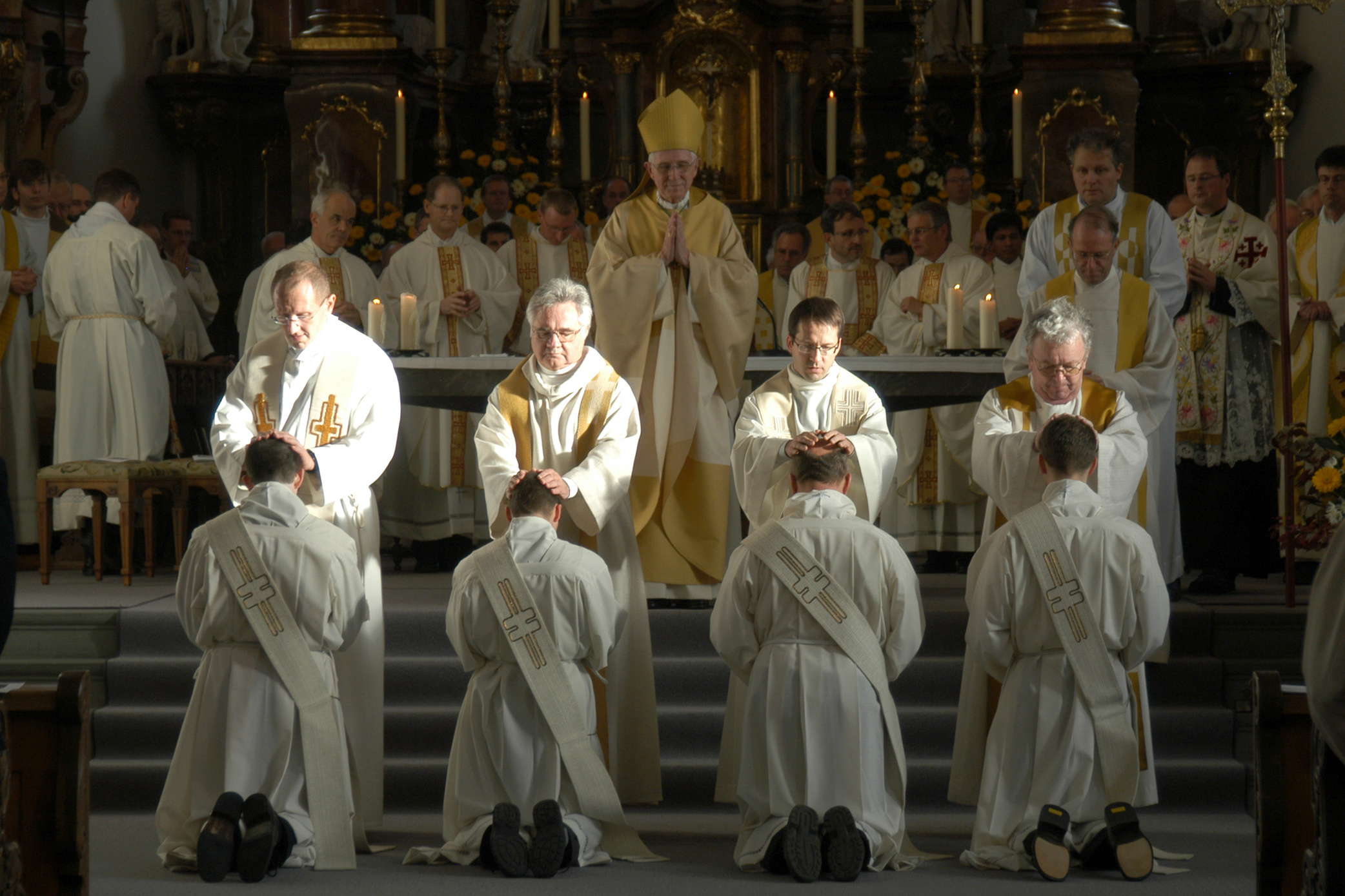
Rite of Ordination in the Latin Church. In the foreground are deacons, in front of them are presbyters, and behind them is the bishop, wearing a mitre

In certain Christian denominations, holy orders are the ordained ministries of bishop, priest (presbyter), and deacon, and the sacrament or rite by which candidates are ordained to those orders. Churches recognizing these orders include the Catholic Church, the Eastern Orthodox (ιερωσύνη [hierōsynē], ιεράτευμα [hierateuma], Священство [Svyashchenstvo]), Oriental Orthodox, Anglican, Assyrian, Old Catholic, Independent Catholic and some Lutheran churches. Except for some Lutherans and Anglicans, these churches regard ordination as a sacrament (the sacramentum ordinis).

Denominations have varied conceptions of holy orders. In some Lutheran and Anglican churches the traditional orders of bishop, priest and deacon are bestowed using ordination rites contained within ordinals. The extent to which ordination is considered sacramental in these traditions has, however, been a matter of some internal dispute. Baptists are among the denominations that do not consider ministry as being sacramental in nature and would not think of it in terms of "holy orders" as such. Historically, the word "order" (Latin ordo) designated an established civil body or corporation with a Hierarchy, and ordinatio meant legal incorporation into an ordo. The word "holy" refers to the church. In context, therefore, a holy order is set apart for ministry in the church. Other positions, such as pope, patriarch, cardinal, monsignor, archbishop, archimandrite, archpriest, protopresbyter, hieromonk, protodeacon and archdeacon, are not sacramental orders but specialized ministries.

== Anglicanism ==
The Anglican churches hold their bishops to be in apostolic succession, although there is some difference of opinion with regard to whether ordination is to be regarded as a sacrament. The Anglican Articles of Religion hold that only baptism and the Lord's Supper are to be counted as sacraments of the gospel, and assert that other rites 'commonly called sacraments' by other denominations (e.g. Catholicism), were not ordained by Christ in the Gospel. They do not have the nature of a sacrament of the Gospel in the absence of any physical matter such as the water in baptism and the bread and wine in the Eucharist. Various editions of the Book of Common Prayer and other Anglican liturgical texts provide rites for ordination of bishops, priests and deacons. Only bishops may ordain people. Within Anglicanism, three bishops are normally required for ordination to the episcopate, while one bishop is sufficient for performing ordinations to the priesthood and diaconate.

== Catholicism ==
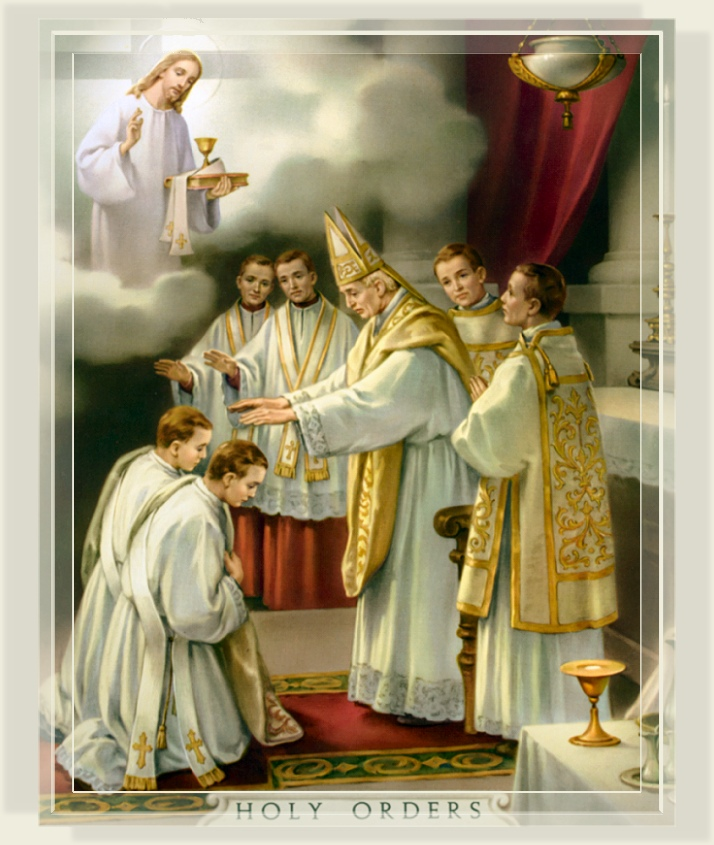
Ordination to the Catholic priesthood in the Latin Church. Devotional card, 1925.

The ministerial orders of the Catholic Church include the orders of bishops, deacons and presbyters, which in Latin is sacerdos. "The fullness of the sacrament of orders" belongs only to Bishops: presbyters and deacons, who are also "ordained", are nevertheless dependent upon bishops in the exercise of their authority. The ordained priesthood and common priesthood (or priesthood of all the baptized) are different in function and essence.

A distinction is made between priest and presbyter. In the 1983 Code of Canon Law, "The Latin words sacerdos and sacerdotium are used to refer in general to the ministerial priesthood shared by bishops and presbyters. The words presbyter, presbyterium and presbyteratus refer to priests [in the English use of the word] and presbyters".

While the consecrated life is neither clerical nor lay by definition, clerics can also be incardinated in an institute of consecrated life or society endowed with this faculty from the Apostolic see.

== Eastern Orthodoxy ==
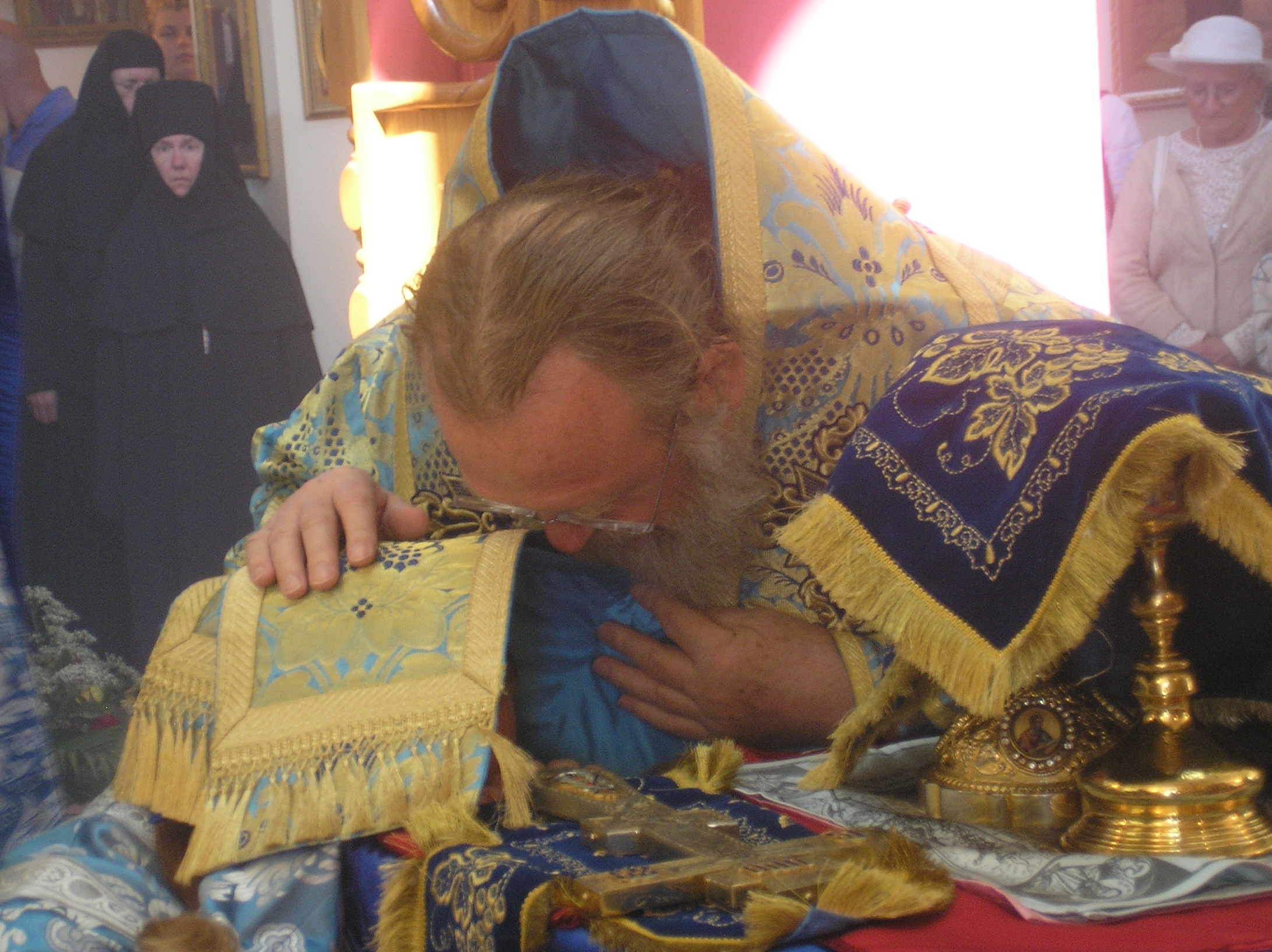
Metropolitan Hilarion (Kapral) performs the laying on of hands (Cheirotonia), conferring the holy order of presbyter (priest) upon an Orthodox deacon.

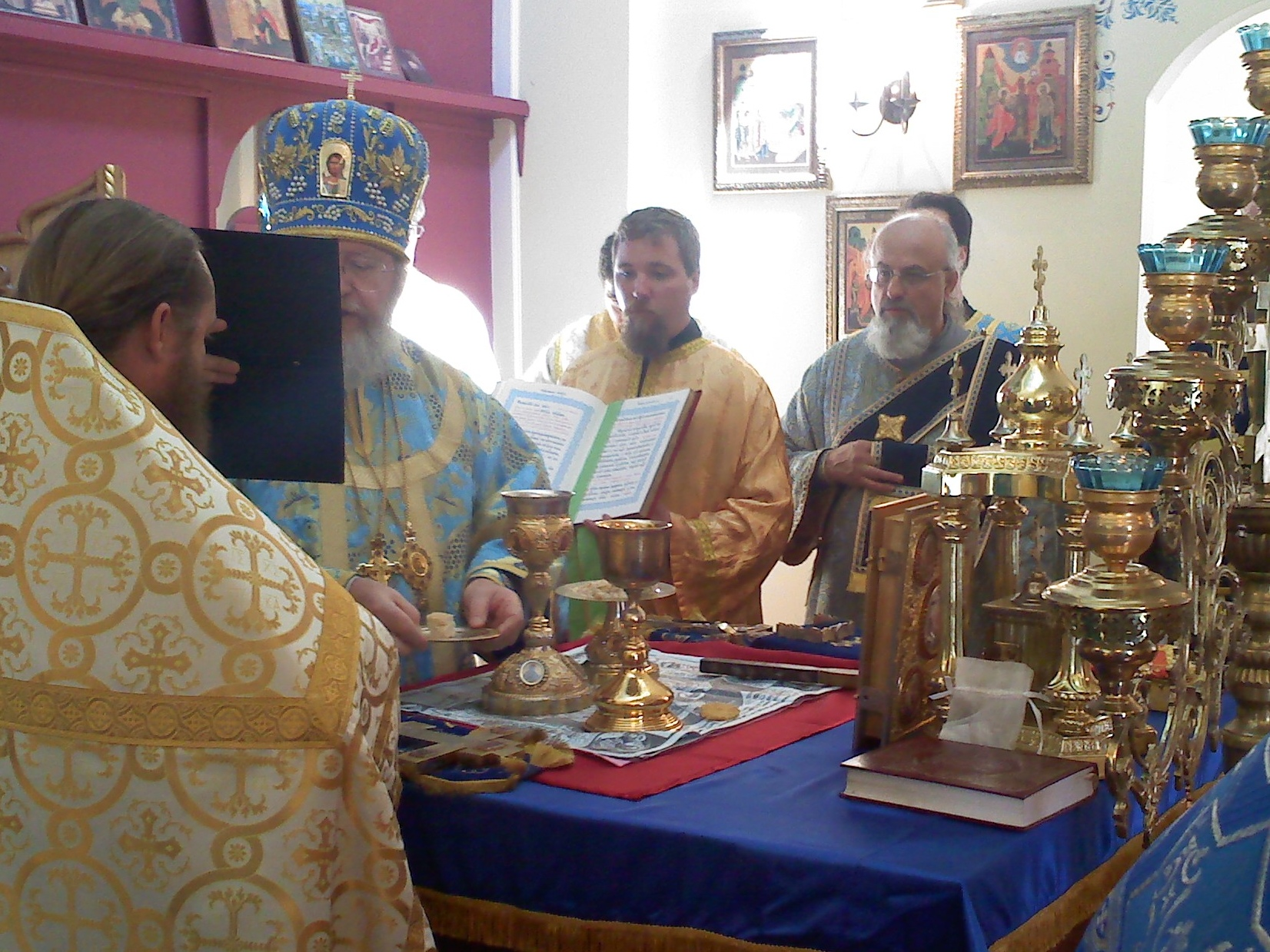
After the transmutation of the Holy Gifts, the bishop presents to the newly ordained priest a portion of the Lamb (i.e., the Body of Christ).

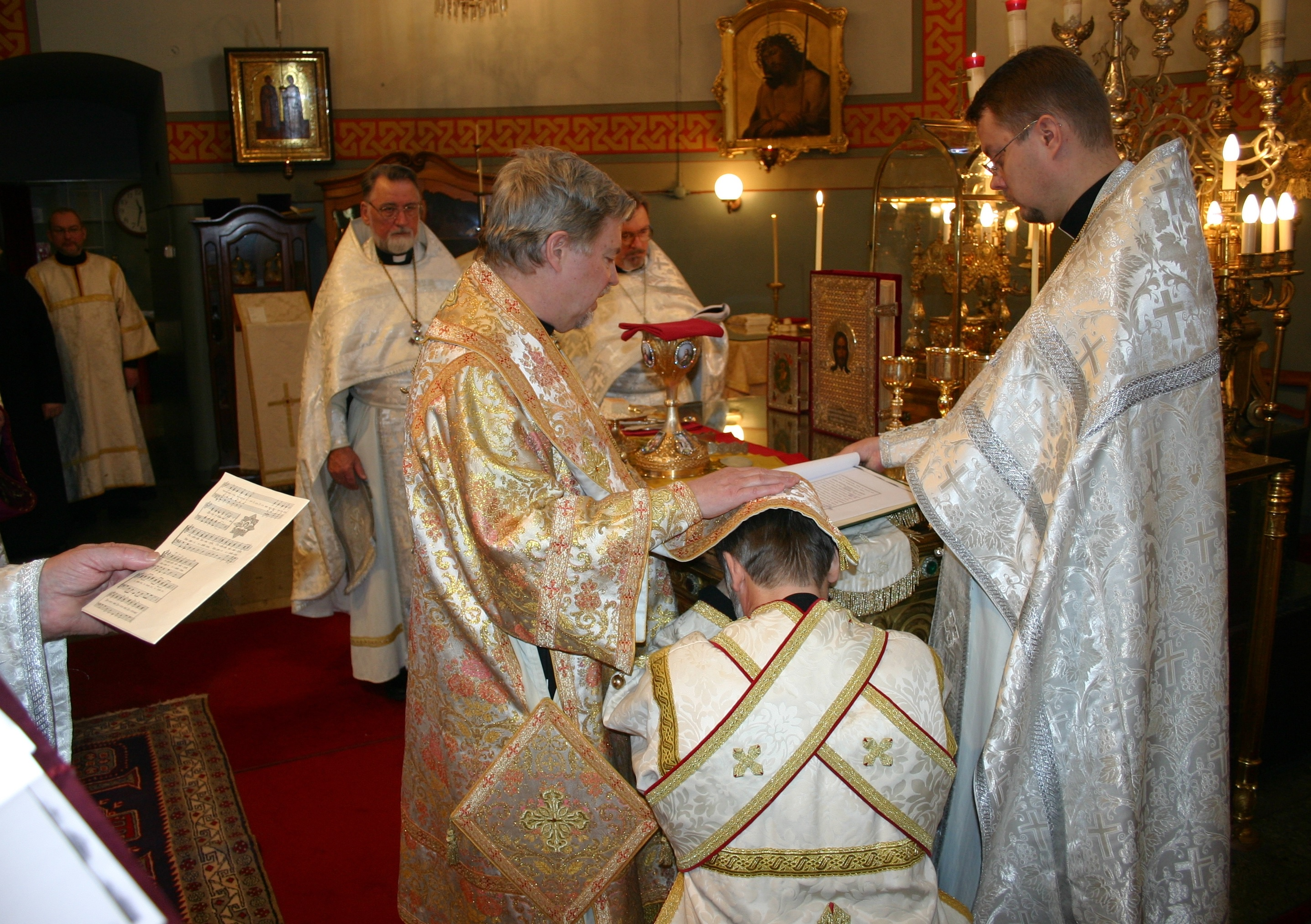
The laying on of hands (Cheirotonia), conferring the holy order of deacon upon an Orthodox subdeacon.

The Eastern Orthodox Church considers ordination (known as cheirotonia, "laying on of hands") to be a sacred mystery (μυστήριο, what in the West is called a sacrament). Although all other mysteries may be performed by a presbyter, ordination may only be conferred by a bishop, and the ordination of a bishop may only be performed by several bishops together. Cheirotonia always takes place during the divine liturgy.

The Eastern Orthodox teach that it was the mission of the apostles to go forth into all the world and preach the Gospel, baptizing those who believed in the name of the Holy Trinity. In the early Church those who presided over congregations were referred to variously as episcopos (bishop) or presbyteros (priest). These successors of the apostles were ordained to their office by the laying on of hands, and according to Eastern Orthodox theology formed a living, organic link with the apostles, and through them with Jesus Christ himself.

The Eastern Orthodox Church also has ordination to minor orders (known as cheirothesia, "imposition of hands") which is performed outside of the Divine Liturgy, typically by a bishop, although certain archimandrites of stavropegial monasteries may bestow cheirothesia on members of their communities.

In Eastern Orthodoxy, a bishop is the collector of the money of the diocese and the living Vessel of Grace through whom the energeia (divine grace) of the Holy Spirit flows into the rest of the church. A bishop is consecrated through the laying on of hands by several bishops; although, with the consent of several other bishops, a single bishop has performed the ordination of another bishop in emergency situations, such as times of persecution.

The consecration of a bishop takes place near the beginning of the liturgy, since a bishop can, in addition to performing the mystery of the Eucharist, also ordain priests and deacons. Before the commencement of the liturgy, the bishop-elect professes, in the middle of the church before the seated bishops who will consecrate him, in detail the doctrines of the Eastern Orthodox faith and pledges to observe the canons of the apostles and councils, the Typikon and customs of the Eastern Orthodox Church and to obey ecclesiastical authority. After the Little Entrance, the archpriest and archdeacon conduct the bishop-elect before the church's royal gates where he is met by the bishops and kneels before the altar on both knees. The Gospel Book is laid over his head and the consecrating bishops lay their hands upon the Gospel Book, while the prayers of ordination are read by the eldest bishop. After this, the newly consecrated bishop ascends the synthranon (bishop's throne in the sanctuary) for the first time. Customarily, the newly consecrated bishop ordains a priest and a deacon at the liturgy during which he is consecrated.

A priest may serve only at the pleasure of his bishop. A bishop bestows faculties (permission to minister within his diocese) giving a priest chrism and an antimins; he may withdraw faculties and demand the return of these items. The ordination of a priest occurs before the Anaphora (Eucharistic Prayer) in order that he may on the same day take part in the celebration of the Eucharist: during the Great Entrance, the candidate for ordination carries the Aër (chalice veil) over his head (rather than on his shoulder, as a deacon otherwise carries it then) as a symbol of giving up his diaconate, and comes last in the procession and stands at the end of the pair of lines of the priests. After the Aër is taken from the candidate to cover the chalice and diskos, a chair is brought for the bishop to sit on by the northeast corner of the holy table (altar). Two deacons go to priest-elect who, at that point, had been standing alone in the middle of the church, and bow him down to the west (to the people) and to the east (to the clergy), asking their consent by saying "Command ye!" and then lead him through the holy doors of the altar where the archdeacon asks the bishop's consent, saying, "Command, most sacred master!" after which a priest escorts the candidate three times around the altar, during which he kisses each corner of the altar or holy table as well as the bishop's epigonation and right hand and prostrates himself before the holy table at each circuit. The candidate is then taken to the southeast corner of the holy table and kneels on both knees, resting his forehead on the edge of the Holy Table. The ordaining bishop then places his omophor and right hand over the ordinand's head and recites aloud the first Prayer of Cheirotonia and then prays silently the other two prayers of cheirotonia while a deacon quietly recites a litany and the clergy, then the congregation, chant "Lord, have mercy". Afterwards, the bishop brings the newly ordained priest to stand in the holy doors and presents him to the faithful. He then clothes the priest in each of his sacerdotal vestments, at each of which the people sing, Worthy!. Later, after the epiklesis of the liturgy, the bishop hands him a portion of the Lamb (Host) saying:

Receive thou this pledge, and preserve it whole and unharmed until thy last breath, because thou shalt be held to an accounting therefore in the second and terrible Coming of our great Lord, God, and Saviour, Jesus Christ.

A deacon may not perform any sacrament and performs no liturgical services on his own but serves only as an assistant to a priest and may not even vest without the blessing of a priest. The ordination of a deacon occurs after the anaphora (eucharistic prayer) since his role is not in performing the mystery or sacrament but consists only in serving; the ceremony is much the same as at the ordination of a priest, but the deacon-elect is presented to the people and escorted to the holy doors by two sub-deacons (his peers, analogous to the two deacons who so present a priest-elect), is escorted three times around the altar by a deacon, and he kneels on only one knee during the Prayer of Cheirotonia. After being vested as a deacon and given a liturgical fan (ripidion or hexapterygion), he is led to the side of the altar where he uses the ripidion to gently fan the holy gifts (the consecrated Body and Blood of Christ).

== Lutheranism ==
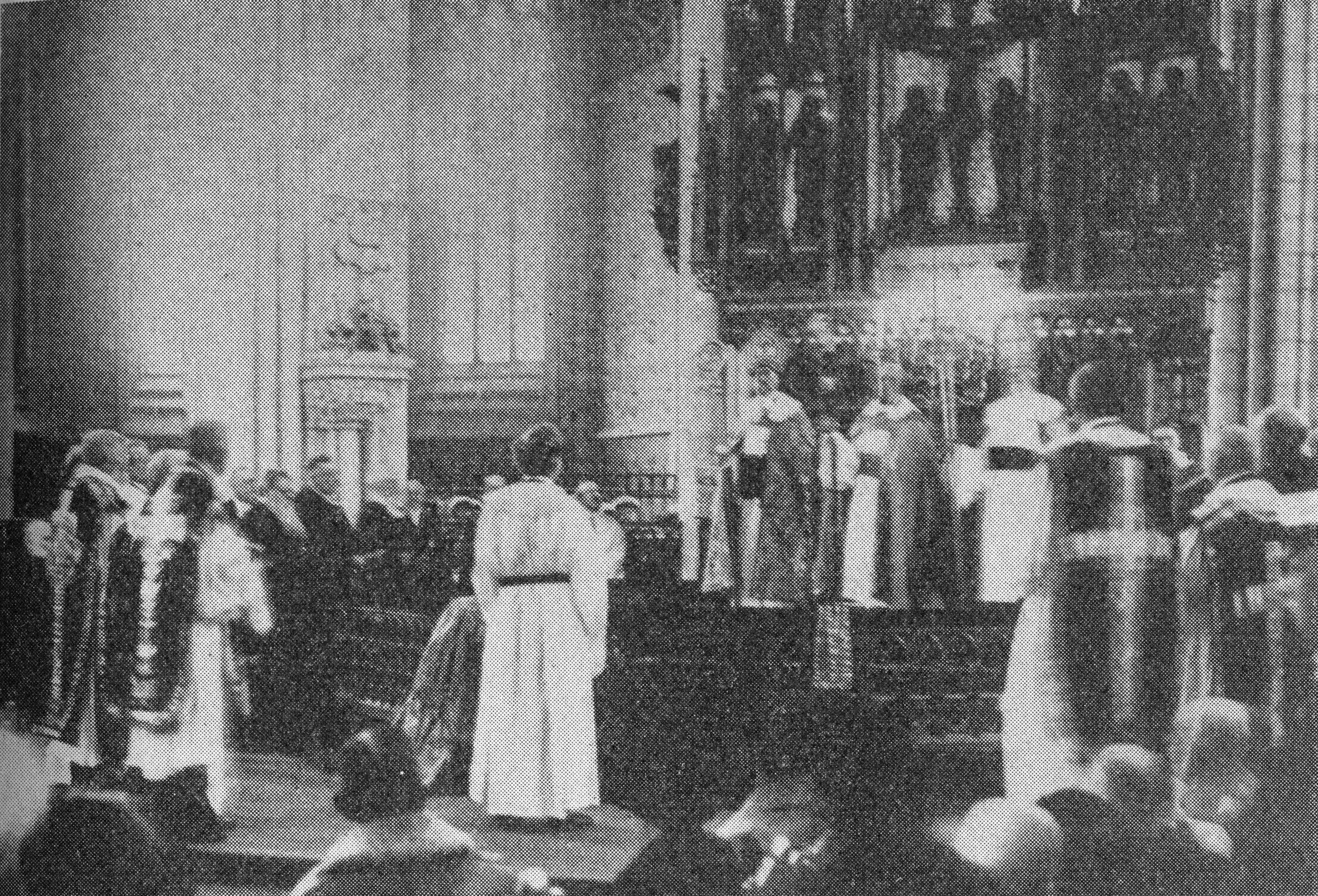
Nathan Söderblom is ordained as the Lutheran archbishop of the Church of Sweden, 1914.

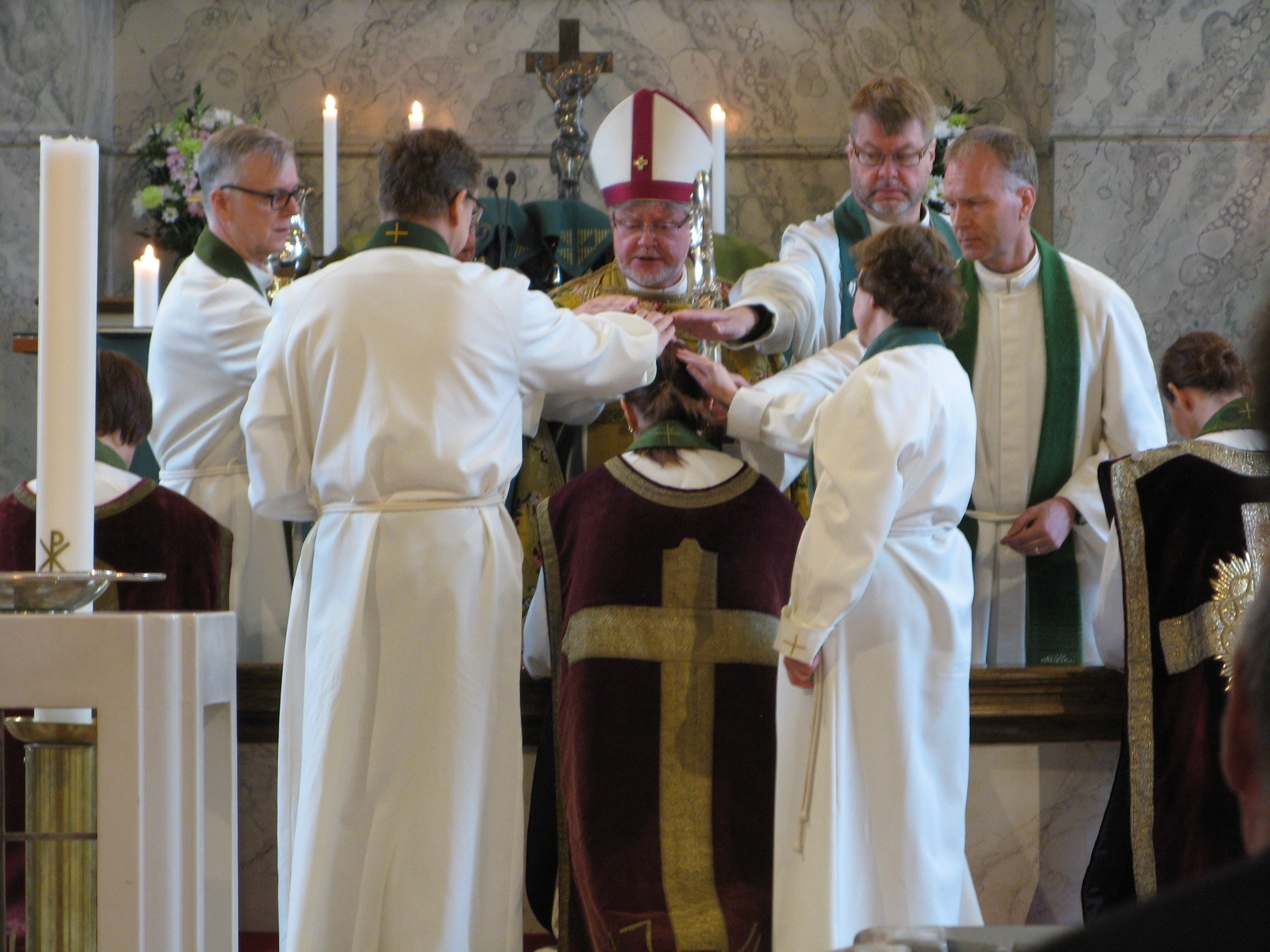
An ordination to the priesthood in the Evangelical Lutheran Church of Finland, 2015

Ordination to holy orders is considered to be either a sacrament or rite in the Lutheran churches, depending on the churchmanship. According to the Book of Concord, an explication of the doctrine of the Lutheran churches: "But if ordination be understood as applying to the ministry of the Word, we are not unwilling to call ordination a sacrament. For the ministry of the Word has God's command and glorious promises, Rom. 1:16: The Gospel is the power of God unto salvation to every one that believeth. Likewise, Isa. 55:11: So shall My Word be that goeth forth out of My mouth; it shall not return unto Me void, but it shall accomplish that which I please. ...If ordination be understood in this way, neither will we refuse to call the imposition of hands a sacrament. For the Church has the command to appoint ministers, which should be most pleasing to us, because we know that God approves this ministry, and is present in the ministry [that God will preach and work through men and those who have been chosen by men]."

The Lutheran reforms are considered to be the most conservative of those that emerged in the Reformation. As such, much of Lutheranism follows the threefold office of deacon, priest, and bishop. The Lutheran archbishops of Finland, Sweden, etc. and Baltic countries are the historic national primates and some ancient cathedrals and parishes in the Lutheran church were constructed many centuries before the Reformation.

Lutherans universally believe that "no one should publicly teach in the Church or administer the Sacraments unless he be regularly called". The Lutheran churches in Scandinavia, and those established in other parts of the world as a result of Scandinavian Lutheran missionary activity (such as the Evangelical Lutheran Church in Kenya), practice episcopal succession in which the bishop whose holy orders can be traced back to the Apostles, performs ordinations.

Additionally, Martin Luther taught that each individual was expected to fulfill his God-appointed task in everyday life. The modern usage of the term vocation as a life-task was first employed by Martin Luther. Therefore Luther's Small Catechism provides passages of Scripture to encourage those in holy orders, including bishops, pastors, preachers, as well as those in governmental offices, citizens, husbands, wives, children, employees, employers, young people, and widows.

== Process and sequence ==
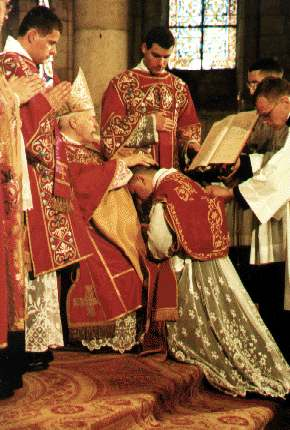
At priestly ordination the bishop imposes hands upon the deacon who is by that matter and the form of the consecratory preface ordained to the priesthood. Pictured is the third imposition of hands as in the pre-1968 Roman Pontifical, in 1999, Fontgombault Abbey, France.

The sequence in which holy orders are received are: minor orders, deacon, priest, bishop.

For Catholics, it is typical in the years of seminary training that a man will be ordained to the diaconate, which Catholics since the Second Vatican Council sometimes call the "transitional diaconate" to distinguish men bound for priesthood from permanent deacons. They are licensed to preach sermons (under certain circumstances a permanent deacon may not receive faculties to preach), to perform baptisms, and to witness Catholic marriages, but to perform no other sacraments. They assist at the eucharist or the Mass, but are not able to consecrate the bread and wine. Normally, after six months or more as a transitional deacon, a man will be ordained to the priesthood. Priests are able to preach, perform baptisms, confirm (with special dispensation from their ordinary), witness marriages, hear confessions and give absolutions, anoint the sick, and celebrate the Mass.

Eastern Orthodox seminarians are typically tonsured as readers before entering the seminary, and may later be made subdeacons or deacons; customs vary between seminaries and between Eastern Orthodox jurisdictions. Some deacons remain permanently in the diaconate while most subsequently are ordained as priests. Orthodox clergy are typically either married or monastic. Monastic deacons are called hierodeacons, monastic priests are called hieromonks. Eastern Orthodox clergy who marry must do so prior to ordination to the subdiaconate (or diaconate, according to local custom) and typically one is either tonsured a monk or married before ordination. A deacon or priest may not marry, or remarry if widowed, without abandoning his clerical office. Often, widowed priests take monastic vows. Eastern Orthodox bishops are always monks; a single or widowed man may be elected a bishop but he must be tonsured a monk before consecration as a bishop.

For Anglicans, a person is usually ordained a deacon once he (or she) has completed training at a theological college. The historic practice of a bishop tutoring a candidate himself ("reading for orders") is still to be found. The candidate then typically serves as an assistant curate and may later be ordained as a priest at the discretion of the bishop. Other deacons may choose to remain in this order. Anglican deacons can preach sermons, perform baptisms and conduct funerals, but, unlike priests, cannot celebrate the eucharistic liturgy. In most branches of the Anglican church, women can be ordained as priests, and in some of them, can also be ordained bishops.

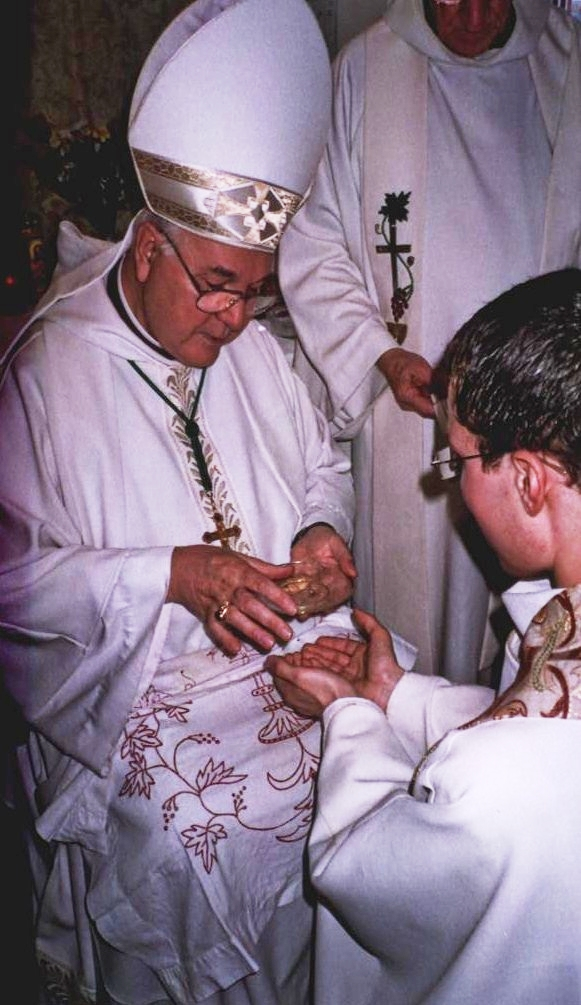
Anointment of the hands of a newly ordained priest.

Bishops are chosen from among priests in churches that adhere to Catholic usage. In the Catholic Church, bishops, like priests, are celibate and thus unmarried; further, a bishop is said to possess the fullness of the sacrament of holy orders, empowering him to ordain deacons, priests, and (with a papal mandate) other bishops. If a bishop, especially one acting as an ordinary—a head of a diocese or archdiocese—is to be ordained, three bishops must usually co-consecrate him with one bishop, usually an archbishop or the bishop of the place, being the chief consecrating prelate.

Among Eastern Rite Catholic and Eastern Orthodox churches, which permit married priests, bishops must either be unmarried or agree to abstain from contact with their wives. It is a common misconception that all such bishops come from religious orders; while this is generally true, it is not an absolute rule. In the case of both Catholics—(Western and) Eastern Catholic, Oriental Orthodox and Eastern Orthodox, they are usually leaders of territorial units called dioceses (or its equivalent in the east, an eparchy). Only bishops can validly administer the sacrament of holy orders.

=== Recognition of other churches' orders ===
The Catholic Church unconditionally recognizes the validity of ordinations in the Eastern churches. Some Eastern Orthodox churches reordain Catholic priests who convert while others accept their Catholic ordination using the concept of economia (church economy). In 1988, the Ordination Joint Committee of Orthodox and Catholic Bishops stated the following:

With either the Roman Catholic understanding of character or the Orthodox understanding of the creation of a permanent hindrance due to sin, "reordination" is impossible. Even in cases when a Roman Catholic cleric may lose clerical status either through cause or petition, the sacred Ordination never becomes invalid. For both Orthodox Christians and Roman Catholics, when a member of the clergy who has been ordained in a church that shares with them an understanding of the Priesthood and by a Bishop in an unquestionable apostolic succession is received into either the Orthodox or the Roman Catholic Church, his ordination should be recognized. It should be noted, however, that until such time when the practice of the Orthodox Church will be unified, these cases will be decided by each Autocephalous Orthodox Church.

Anglican churches claim to have maintained apostolic succession. The succession of Anglican bishops is not universally recognized, however. The Catholic Church judged Anglican orders invalid when Pope Leo XIII in 1896 wrote in Apostolicae curae that Anglican orders lack validity because the rite by which priests were ordained was not correctly worded from 1547 to 1553 and from 1559 to the time of Archbishop William Laud (Archbishop of Canterbury 1633–1645). The papacy claimed the form and matter was inadequate to make a Catholic bishop. The actual "mechanical" succession, prayer and laying on hands, was not disputed. Two of the four consecrators of Matthew Parker in 1559 had been consecrated using the Edwardine Ordinals and two using the Roman Pontifical. Nonetheless, they believed that this caused a break of continuity in apostolic succession, making all further ordinations null and void.

Eastern Orthodox bishops have, on occasion, granted "economy" when Anglican priests convert to Eastern Orthodoxy. Various Eastern Orthodox churches have also declared Anglican orders valid subject to a finding that the bishops in question did indeed maintain the true faith, the Orthodox concept of apostolic succession being one in which the faith must be properly adhered to and transmitted, not simply that the ceremony by which a man is made a bishop is conducted correctly. Some Eastern Orthodox have also considered holy orders from canonically unrecognized or disputed, or independent Eastern Orthodox churches as valid.

Several Eastern Orthodox patriarchs and synods have recognized the validity of Anglican orders. In 1922, the Ecumenical Patriarch Meletios IV issued a statement recognizing that Anglican ordinations were "of the same validity as those of the Roman, Old Catholic, and Armenian Churches." The 1923 Synod of Constantinople reaffirmed this position. Following this statement from Constantinople, the Eastern Orthodox churches of Alexandria, Cyprus, Greece, Jerusalem, Sinai, and Romania conditionally recognized Anglican orders as valid. The Holy Synod of the Church of Cyprus recognized the validity of Anglican orders in 1923, as did the patriarch of the Greek Orthodox Church of Jerusalem, Damian I, and the synod of his church, in the same year. The Greek Orthodox Patriarch of Alexandria officially recognized the validity of Anglican orders in 1930. In 1936, the Holy Synod of the Romanian Orthodox Church formally recognized the validity of Anglican orders. In 1939, the Synod of the Church of Greece agreed to recognize Anglican Orders as valid "by economy" or "as an indulgence, not a right." As of 2022, these recognitions had "not been rescinded". Ecumenical dialogues between the Eastern Orthodox and Anglican churches on the recognition of orders are ongoing.

Changes in the Anglican ordinals since King Edward VI, and a fuller appreciation of the pre-Reformation ordinals, suggest that the correctness of the enduring dismissal of Anglican orders is questionable. To reduce doubt concerning Anglican apostolic succession, especially since the 1931 Bonn agreement between the Anglican and Old Catholic churches, some Anglican bishops have included among their consecrators bishops of the Old Catholic Church, whose holy orders are recognised as valid and regular by the Catholic Church.

Neither Catholics nor Anglicans recognize the validity of ordinations of ministers in Protestant churches that do not maintain apostolic succession; but some Anglicans, especially Low Church or Evangelical ones, commonly treat Protestant ministers and their sacraments as valid. Rome also does not recognize the apostolic succession of those Lutheran bodies which retained apostolic succession.

Officially, the Anglican Communion accepts the ordinations of those denominations which are in full communion with their own churches, such as the Lutheran state churches of Scandinavia. Those clergy may preside at services requiring a priest if one is not otherwise available.

The Oriental Orthodox Churches recognizes the ordinations of both Catholic and Eastern Orthodox churches.

=== Marriage and holy orders ===
Married men may be ordained to the diaconate as permanent deacons, but in the Latin Church of the Catholic Church generally may not be ordained to the priesthood. In the Eastern Catholic Churches and in the Eastern Orthodox Church, married deacons may be ordained priests but may not become bishops. Bishops in the Eastern Rites and the Eastern Orthodox churches are almost always drawn from among monks, who have taken a vow of celibacy. They may be widowers, though; it is not required of them never to have been married.

In some cases, widowed permanent deacons have been ordained to the priesthood. There have been some situations in which men previously married and ordained to the priesthood in an Anglican church or in a Lutheran church have been ordained to the Catholic priesthood and allowed to function much as an Eastern Rite priest but in a Latin Church setting. This is never sub conditione (conditionally), as there is in Catholic canon law no true priesthood in Protestant denominations. Such ordination may only happen with the approval of the priest's Bishop and a special permission by the Pope.

Anglican clergy may be married or may marry after ordination. In the Old Catholic Church and the Independent Catholic Churches there are no ordination restrictions related to marriage.

== Other concepts of ordination ==
Ordination ritual and procedures vary by denomination. Different churches and denominations specify more or less rigorous requirements for entering into office, and the process of ordination is likewise given more or less ceremonial pomp depending on the group. Many Protestants still communicate authority and ordain to office by having the existing overseers physically lay hands on the candidates for office.

=== Methodist churches ===
The American Methodist model is an episcopal system loosely based on the Anglican model, as the Methodist Church arose from the Anglican Church. It was first devised under the leadership of Bishops Thomas Coke and Francis Asbury of the Methodist Episcopal Church in the late 18th century. In this approach, an elder (or 'presbyter') is ordained to word (preaching and teaching), sacrament (administering Baptism and the Lord's Supper), order (administering the life of the church and, in the case of bishops, ordaining others for mission and ministry), and service. A deacon is a person ordained only to word and service.

In the United Methodist Church, for instance, seminary graduates are examined and approved by the Conference Board of Ordained Ministry and then the Clergy Session. They are accepted as "probationary (provisional) members of the conference." The resident bishop may commission them to full-time ministry as "provisional" ministers. (Before 1996, the graduate was ordained as a transitional deacon at this point, a provisional role since eliminated. The order of deacon is now a separate and distinct clergy order in the United Methodist Church.) After serving the probationary period, of a minimum of two years, the probationer is then examined again and either continued on probation, discontinued altogether, or approved for ordination. Upon final approval by the Clergy Session of the Conference, the probationer becomes a full member of the Conference and is then ordained as an elder or deacon by the resident bishop. Those ordained as elders are members of the Order of Elders, and those ordained deacons are members of the Order of Deacons.

John Wesley appointed Thomas Coke (above mentioned as bishop) as 'Superintendent', his translation of the Greek episcopos ("overseer") – which is normally translated 'bishop' in English. The British Methodist Conference has two distinct orders of presbyter and deacon. It does not have bishops as a separate order of ministry. The British Methodist Church has more than 500 superintendents, who are not a separate order of ministry but a role within the order of presbyters. The roles normally undertaken by bishops are expressed in ordaining presbyters and deacons by the annual Conference through its president (or a past president); in confirmation by all presbyters; in local oversight by superintendents; in regional oversight by chairs of Districts.

=== Presbyterian churches ===
Presbyterian churches, following their Scottish forebears, reject the traditions surrounding overseers and instead identify the offices of bishop (episkopos in Greek) and elder (presbuteros in Greek, from which the term "presbyterian" comes). The two terms seem to be used interchangeably in the Bible (compare Titus 1.5–9 and I Tim. 3.2–7). Their form of church governance is known as presbyterian polity. While there is increasing authority with each level of gathering of elders ('Session' over a congregation or parish, then presbytery, then possibly a synod, then the General Assembly), there is no hierarchy of elders. Each elder has an equal vote at the court on which they stand.

Elders are usually chosen at their local level, either elected by the congregation and approved by the Session, or appointed directly by the Session. Some churches place limits on the term that the elders serve, while others ordain elders for life.

Presbyterians also ordain (by laying on of hands) ministers of Word and Sacrament (sometimes known as 'teaching elders'). These ministers are regarded simply as Presbyters ordained to a different function, but in practice they provide the leadership for the local Session.

Some Presbyterians identify those appointed (by the laying on of hands) to serve in practical ways (Acts 6.1–7) as deacons (diakonos in Greek, meaning 'servant'). In many congregations, a group of men or women is thus set aside to deal with matters such as congregational fabric and finance, releasing elders for more 'spiritual' work. These persons may be known as 'deacons', 'board members' or 'managers', depending on the local tradition. Unlike elders and ministers, they are not usually 'ordained', and are often elected by the congregation for a set period of time.

Other Presbyterians have used an 'order of deacons' as full-time servants of the wider Church. Unlike ministers, they do not administer sacraments or routinely preach. The Church of Scotland has recently begun ordaining deacons to this role.

Unlike the Episcopalian system, but similar to the United Methodist system described above, the two Presbyterian offices are different in kind rather than in degree, since one need not be a deacon before becoming an elder. Since there is no hierarchy, the two offices do not make up an 'order' in the technical sense, but the terminology of holy orders is sometimes still developed.

=== Congregationalist churches ===
Congregationalist churches implement different schemes, but the officers usually have less authority than in the presbyterian or episcopalian forms. Some ordain only ministers and rotate members on an advisory board (sometimes called a board of elders or a board of deacons). Because the positions are by comparison less powerful, there is usually less rigor or fanfare in how officers are ordained.

=== Irvingian churches ===
Irvingian churches teach a fourfold ministry of "apostles, prophets, evangelists, and pastors".

=== Latter Day Saint movement ===
==== The Church of Jesus Christ of Latter-day Saints ====
The Church of Jesus Christ of Latter-day Saints (LDS Church) accepts the legal authority of clergy to perform marriages but does not recognize any other sacraments performed by ministers not ordained to the Latter-day Saint priesthood. Although the Latter-day Saints do claim a doctrine of a certain spiritual "apostolic succession", it is significantly different from that claimed by Catholics and Protestants since there is no succession or continuity between the first century and the lifetime of Joseph Smith, the founder of the LDS church. Mormons teach that the priesthood was lost in ancient times not to be restored by Christ until the nineteenth century when it was given to Joseph Smith directly.

The Church of Jesus Christ of Latter-day Saints has a relatively open priesthood, ordaining nearly all worthy adult males and boys of the age of twelve and older. Latter-day Saint priesthood consists of two divisions: the Melchizedek Priesthood and Aaronic Priesthood. The Melchizedek Priesthood because Melchizedek was such a great high priest. Before his day it was called the Holy Priesthood, after the Order of the Son of God. But out of respect or reverence to the name of the Supreme Being, to avoid the too frequent repetition of his name, the church, in ancient days, called that priesthood after Melchizedek. The lesser priesthood is an appendage to the Melchizedek Priesthood. It is called the Aaronic Priesthood because it was conferred on Aaron and his sons throughout all their generations. The offices, or ranks, of the Melchizedek order (in roughly descending order) include apostle, seventy, patriarch, high priest, and elder. The offices of the Aaronic order are bishop, priest, teacher, and deacon. The manner of ordination consists of the laying on of hands by two or more men holding at least the office being conferred while one acts as voice in conferring the priesthood or office and usually pronounces a blessing upon the recipient. Teachers and deacons do not have the authority to ordain others to the priesthood. All church members are authorized to teach and preach regardless of priesthood ordination so long as they maintain good standing within the church. The church does not use the term "holy orders."

==== Community of Christ ====
Community of Christ has a largely volunteer priesthood, and all members of the priesthood are free to marry (as traditionally defined by the Christian community). The priesthood is divided into two orders, the Aaronic priesthood and the Melchisedec priesthood. The Aaronic order consists of the offices of deacon, teacher and priest. The Melchisedec Order consists of the offices of elder (including the specialized office of seventy) and high priest (including the specialized offices of evangelist, bishop, apostle, and prophet). Paid ministers include "appointees" and the general officers of the church, which include some specialized priesthood offices (such as the office of president, reserved for the three top members of the church leadership team). As of 1984, women have been eligible for priesthood, which is conferred through the sacrament of ordination by the laying-on-of-hands. While there is technically no age requirement for any office of priesthood, there is no automatic ordination or progression as in the LDS Church. Young people are occasionally ordained as deacon, and sometimes teacher or priest, but generally most priesthood members are called following completion of post secondary school education. In March 2007 a woman was ordained for the first time to the office of president.

== Ordination of women ==
The Catholic Church, in accordance with its interpretation of the theological tradition on the issue, and the definitive clarification found in the encyclical letter Ordinatio sacerdotalis (1994) written by Pope John Paul II, officially teaches that it has no authority to ordain women as priests and thus there is no possibility of women becoming priests at any time in the future. "Ordaining" women as deaconesses is not a possibility in any sacramental sense of the diaconate, for a deaconess is not simply a female who is a deacon but instead holds a position of lay service. As such, she does not receive the sacrament of holy orders. Many Lutheran, Anglican and other Protestant churches ordain women, but in many cases, only to the office of deacon.

Various branches of the Eastern Orthodox churches, including the Greek Orthodox, currently set aside vows of deaconesses. Some churches are internally divided on whether the Scriptures permit the ordination of women. When one considers the relative size of the traditions (1.1 billion Catholics, 300 million Orthodox, 590 million Protestants), it is a minority of Christian churches that ordain women. Protestants constitute about 27 percent of Christians worldwide, and most of their churches that do ordain women have only done so within the past century; moreover, denominations within the same tradition may differ with respect to women's ordination. For example, in Methodism, the Primitive Methodist Church does not ordain women, while the Free Methodist Church does ordain women.

In some traditions women may be ordained to the same orders as men. In others women are restricted from certain offices. Women may be ordained bishop in the Old Catholic churches and in the Anglican/Episcopal churches in Scotland, Ireland, Wales, Cuba, Brazil, South Africa, Canada, US, Australia, Aotearoa New Zealand and Polynesia. The Church of Ireland had installed Pat Storey in 2013. On 19 September 2013, Storey was chosen by the House of Bishops to succeed Richard Clarke as Bishop of Meath and Kildare. She was consecrated to the episcopate at Christ Church Cathedral, Dublin, on 30 November 2013. She is the first woman to be elected as a bishop in the Church of Ireland and the first woman to be an Anglican Communion bishop in Ireland and Great Britain. The Church of England's General Synod voted in 2014 to allow women to be ordained to the episcopate, with Libby Lane being the first woman to be ordained bishop. Continuing Anglican churches of the world do not permit women to be ordained. In some Protestant denominations, women may serve as assistant pastors but not as pastors in charge of congregations. In some denominations, women can be ordained to be an elder or deacon. Some denominations allow for the ordination of women for certain religious orders. Within certain traditions, such as the Anglican and Lutheran, there is a diversity of theology and practice regarding ordination of women.

== Ordination of LGBT clergy ==
The ordination of lesbian, gay, bisexual or transgender clergy who are sexually active, and open about it, represents a fiercely contested subject within many mainline Protestant communities. The majority of churches are opposed to such ordinations because they view homosexuality as a sin and incompatible with Biblical teaching and traditional Christian practice. Yet there are an increasing number of Christian congregations and communities that are open to ordaining people who are gay or lesbian. These are liberal Protestant denominations, such as the Episcopal Church, the United Church of Christ, and the Evangelical Lutheran Church in America, plus the small Metropolitan Community Church, founded as a church intending to minister primarily to LGBT people, and the Church of Sweden where such clergy may serve in senior clerical positions. The Church of Norway has for many years had both gay and lesbian priests, even bishops, and in 2006 the first woman who was appointed a bishop in Norway came out as an active homosexual herself, and that she had been a homosexual since before she joined the church.

The issue of ordination has caused particular controversy in the worldwide Anglican Communion, following the approval of Gene Robinson to be Bishop of New Hampshire in the US Episcopal Church.

== Print resources ==
- Campbell, Dennis. Yoke of Obedience, 1988. ISBN 0-687-46660-1
- Oden, Thomas. Pastoral Theology: Essentials of Ministry, 1983. ISBN 0-06-066353-7
- Willimon, William. Calling & Character: Virtues of the Ordained Life, 2000. ISBN 0-687-09033-4
- Willimon, William. Pastor: The Theology and Practice of Ordained Ministry, 2002. ISBN 0-687-04532-0
