= Andreas Holmberg =

Andreas Holmberg may refer to:

- Andreas Holmberg (bishop)
- Andreas Holmberg (footballer)
