= Krister Stendahl =

Swedish theologian and New Testament scholar (1921-2008)

The Right Reverend Krister Stendahl D.D.
- Bishop of Stockholm
- Church: Church of Sweden
- Diocese: Stockholm
- Appointed: 7 June 1984
- In office: 1984–1988
- Predecessor: Lars Carlzon
- Successor: Henrik Svenungsson

Orders
- Ordination: 17 December 1944 by Manfred Björkquist
- Consecration: 7 October 1984 by Bertil Werkström

Personal details
- Born: 21 April 1921 Sennan, Halmstad, Sweden
- Died: 15 April 2008 (aged 86) Boston, Massachusetts, United States
- Denomination: Lutheranism
- Spouse: Brita Johnsson
- Children: 3

Krister Olofson Stendahl (21 April 1921 – 15 April 2008) was a Swedish theologian, New Testament scholar, and Church of Sweden Bishop of Stockholm. He also served as dean, professor, and professor emeritus at Harvard Divinity School.

== Life ==
Stendahl received his doctorate in New Testament studies from Uppsala University with his dissertation The school of St. Matthew and its use of the Old Testament (1954). He was later Professor at the Divinity School at Harvard University, where he also served as dean, before being elected Bishop of Stockholm in 1984. Stendahl was the second director of the Center for Religious Pluralism at the Shalom Hartman Institute in Jerusalem. After retiring in 1989, he returned to the United States, and was Mellon Professor of Divinity Emeritus at the Harvard Divinity School. He also taught at Brandeis University. Bishop Stendahl was an honorary fellow of the Graduate Theological Foundation. In 1971, Stendahl was awarded an honorary Doctor of Divinity (D.D.) degree from Whittier College.

Stendahl is perhaps most famous for his publication of the article "The Apostle Paul and the Introspective Conscience of the West". This article, along with the later publication of the book Paul Among Jews and Gentiles, conveys a new idea in Pauline studies suggesting that scholarship dating back to Augustine may miss the context and thesis of Paul. His main point revolves around the early tension in Christianity between Jewish Christians and Gentile converts. According to Stendahl, the main concern of Paul's writings on Jesus' role, and salvation by faith, is the problem of the inclusion of gentile (Greek) Torah observers into God's covenant. (Note: Dunn quotes Stendahl: "Cf Stendahl, Paul among Jews and Gentiles, passim-e.g "... a doctrine of faith was hammered out by Paul for the very specific and limited purpose of defending the rights of Gentile converts to be full and genuine heirs to the promise of God to Israel"(p.2)" Stephen Westerholm: "For Paul, the question that "justification by faith" was intended to answer was, "On what terms can Gentiles gain entrance to the people of God?” Bent on denying any suggestion that Gentiles must become Jews and keep the Jewish law, he answered, "By faith—and not by works of the (Jewish) law.”" Westerholm refers to: Krister Stendahl, The Apostle Paul and the Introspective Conscience of the West, Harvard Theological Review 56 (1963), 199–215; reprinted in Stendahl, Paul Among Jews and Gentiles and Other Essays (Philadelphia: Fortress, 1976), 78–96. Westerholm quotes Sanders: "Sanders noted that "the salvation of the Gentiles is essential to Paul’s preaching; and with it falls the law; for, as Paul says simply, Gentiles cannot live by the law (Gal. 2.14)” (496). On a similar note, Sanders suggested that the only Jewish "boasting" to which Paul objected was that which exulted over the divine privileges granted to Israel and failed to acknowledge that God, in Christ, had opened the door of salvation to Gentiles.") He specifically argues that later interpreters of Paul have assumed a hyper-active conscience when they have begun exegesis of his works. As a result, they have suggested an overly psychological interpretation of the apostle Paul, that Paul himself would most likely not have understood at all for himself.

Stendahl actively participated in The Villanova University Theology Institute founded by Professor Joseph Papin who directed the Institute and edited its publications between 1967 and 1974.

Through his interest in the Jewish context of the New Testament, Stendahl developed an interest in Jewish Studies and was active in Jewish–Christian dialogue.

Stendahl is credited with creating Stendahl's three rules of religious understanding, which he presented in a 1985 press conference in Stockholm, Sweden, in response to vocal opposition to the building of a temple there by the Church of Jesus Christ of Latter-day Saints. His rules are as follows:

1. When you are trying to understand another religion, you should ask the adherents of that religion and not its enemies.
2. Don't compare your best to their worst.
3. Leave room for "holy envy." (By this Stendahl meant that you should be willing to recognize elements in the other religious tradition or faith that you admire and wish could, in some way, be reflected in your own religious tradition or faith.)

He died six days before his 87th birthday.

== Selected bibliography ==
- Stendahl, Krister. The school of St. Matthew, and its use of the Old Testament. Uppsala: C. W. K. Gleerup, Lund, 1954; 2nd ed. 1968.
- Stendahl, Krister. Scrolls and the New Testament. NY: Harper, 1967; SCM Press, 1958. Reprint ISBN 0-8371-7171-7
- Stendahl, Krister. The Bible and the Role of Women. Philadelphia: Fortress Press, 1966. ISBN 0-8006-3030-0
- Runyon, Theodore and Krister Stendahl. What the Spirit is Saying to the Churches: Essays. Hawthorn Books, 1975. ISBN 0-8015-8546-5
- Stendahl, Krister. Paul Among Jews and Gentiles and Other Essays. Philadelphia: Fortress Press, 1976. ISBN 0-8006-1224-8
- Stendahl, Krister. Meanings: The Bible As Document and As Guide. Fortress Press, 1984. ISBN 0-8006-1752-5
- Stendahl, Krister. Holy Week Preaching. Philadelphia : Fortress Press, 1985. ISBN 0-8006-1851-3
- Stendahl, Krister. Final Account: Paul's Letter to the Romans. Augsburg Fortress, 1995. ISBN 0-8006-2922-1
- Stendahl, Krister. Energy for Life: Reflections on a Theme: "Come Holy Spirit, Renew the Whole Creation". Paraclete Press, 1999. ISBN 2-8254-0986-3 ISBN 1-55725-233-5
- Nickelsburg, George and George Macrae, eds. Christians Among Jews and Gentiles: Essays in Honor of Krister Stendahl on His 65th Birthday. Fortress Press, 1986. ISBN 0-8006-1943-9
- Horsley, Richard A., ed. Paul and Politics: Ekklesia, Israel, Imperium, Interpretation. Trinity Press, 2000. ISBN 1-56338-323-3
- Stendahl, Krister. "The Role of the Bible in the Theology of the Future," The Dynamic in Christian Thought, Villanova Theological Symposium, Volume I, Ed. Joseph Papin (Villanova University Press,1970), pp. 44–51.
- Stendahl, Krister. "On Earth as it is in Heaven - Dynamics in Christian Eschatology", The Escaton: A Community of Love, Villanova Theological Symposium, Volume V, Ed. Joseph Papin (Villanova University Press, 1971), pp. 57–68.
- Stendahl, Krister, "A Letter in Honor of Dr. Papin", Transcendence and Immanence, Reconstruction in the Light of Process Thinking, Festschrift in Honor of Joseph Papin, ed. Joseph Armenti (The Abbey Press: St. Meinrad, 1972), p. 5.

== Sources ==
- Dunn, James D.G. (4 November 1982), "The New Perspective on Paul", Manson Memorial Lecture.
- Finlan, Stephen (2004), The Background and Content of Paul's Cultic Atonement Metaphors, Society of Biblical Literature.
- Taylor, Barbara Brown (2019), Holy Envy: Finding God in the Faith of Others, HarperOne.
