= Bjorkquist =

Bjorkquist may refer to:

- Manfred Björkquist (1884–1985), Swedish bishop
- Bjorkquist et al. v. Attorney General of Canada, court case on Canadian citizenship by descent
