= Lars Carlzon =

Swedish bishop

The Right Reverend Lars Carlzon
- Bishop of Stockholm
- Church: Church of Sweden
- Diocese: Stockholm
- In office: 1979–1984
- Predecessor: Ingmar Ström
- Successor: Krister Stendahl

Orders
- Ordination: 1945
- Consecration: 1979

Personal details
- Born: 20 February 1918 Hakarps, Sweden
- Died: 23 July 2004 (aged 86)
- Denomination: Lutheran
- Parents: Axel Carlzon & Benny Jonsson
- Spouse: Ann-Marie Einestam

Lars Axel Carlzon (20 February 1918 – 23 July 2004) was a Swedish prelate who was the Bishop in Stockholm between 1979 and 1984.

== Biography ==
Carlzon was born on 20 February 1918 in Hakarps, Sweden, the son of Axel Carlzon and Benny Jonsson. He graduated with a Bachelor of Arts in Jönköping in 1937 and graduated with a Bachelor of Divinity from Uppsala University in 1944. He was ordained a priest in 1945 and became a school secretary in 1945 and vicar in Växjö in 1948. In 1951 he became a chaplain to sailors in Lisbon and then in San Pedro, Los Angeles, in 1952. In 1954 he was involved in the health and care sector for sailors and in 1961 he became Deputy Secretary General of the Church of Sweden's Seamen's board of directors and secretary-general between 1962 and 1972. In 1972, he was appointed dean and provost of Storkyrkan, Stockholm's Cathedral. He was also a member of the merchant navy welfare council between 1962 and 1972.

In 1979 he was elected Bishop of Stockholm. In 1980 he ordained Antje Jackelen a priest, Sweden's future archbishop. Carlzon was also chairman of the Sjömanskyrkan in Stockholm. Carlzon, who was a Social Democrat who advocated in favour of female priests, was an activist with regard to peace and immigration issues and was seen in various protests. He received both appreciation and criticism for his support for homosexuals and the worship services in connection with the Pride Week that he organised. Carlzon was also commissioned to represent the Swedish Church in relation to the churches in the eastern states. The task involved numerous meetings with church leaders in the Orthodox churches. He also saw it as his task to find a platform to try to support them, notably to support the church in East Germany which was subjected to retaliation. He was also chairman of the Sweden–GDR Association, a role he had from 1987 until its dissolution in January 1991. According to some, he had no real sympathy with the Communist regime in East Germany and received the news about the fall of the Berlin Wall with great joy. he retired as Bishop of Stockholm in 1984.
