= Helge Ljungberg =

Swedish bishop and religious historian (1904–1983)

The Right Reverend Helge Ljungberg Th.D.
- Bishop of Stockholm
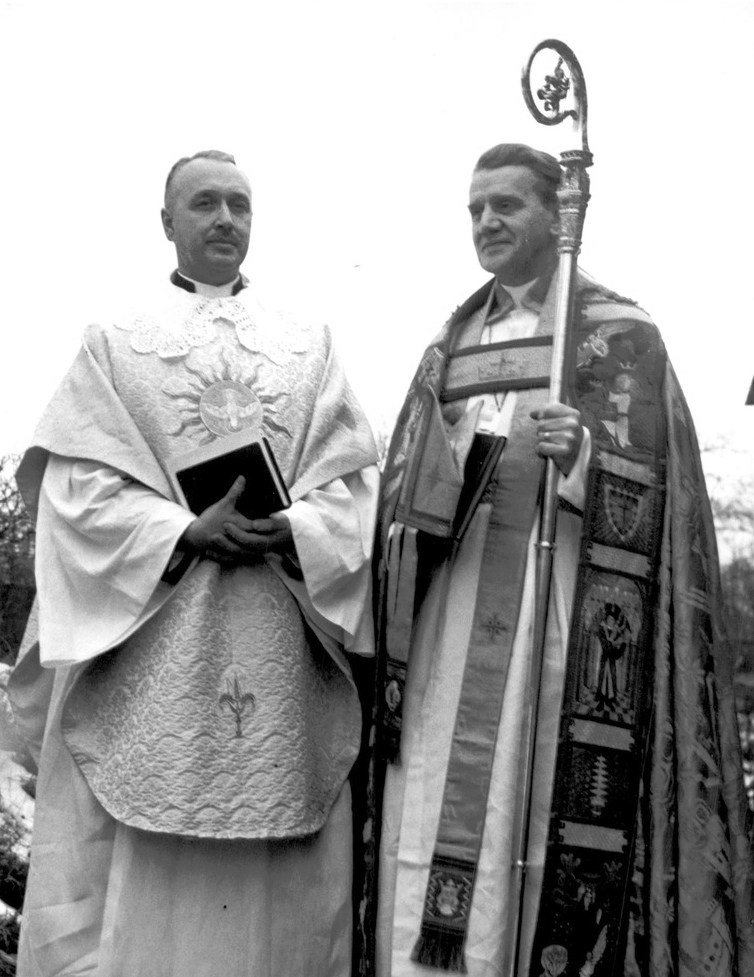
- Helge Ljungberg (right) installs Arne Branderud as vicar of Brännkyrka in 1957.
- Church: Church of Sweden
- Diocese: Stockholm
- In office: 1954–1971
- Predecessor: Manfred Björkquist
- Successor: Ingmar Ström

Personal details
- Born: 25 November 1904 Enköping, Sweden
- Died: 24 November 1983 (aged 78) Stockholm, Sweden
- Buried: Danderyd Church Cemetery
- Denomination: Lutheran
- Parents: David Ljungberg, Hilda Jansson
- Spouse: Ruth Sterner
- Children: 3

Helge David Ljungberg (25 November 1904 – 24 November 1983) was a Swedish religious historian and Bishop of Stockholm from 1954 to 1971.

== Early life and education ==
Ljungberg was born in Enköping in Uppsala County, Sweden, the son of David Ljungberg, a priest, and Hilda Jansson. His sister was the politician Blenda Ljungberg.

At Uppsala University he earned Bachelor of Arts degrees in philosophy in 1926 and theology in 1928, and a doctorate in theology in 1938 with a dissertation on the Christianisation of Scandinavia.

== Academic career ==
From 1938 to 1950, Ljungberg was a docent in the history and psychology of religion at Uppsala University. He was a scholar of Swedish pre-Christian religion and published several books on the subject, including in 1980 the popular work Röde Orm och Vite Krist (Red Serpent and White Christ). He became a member of the Royal Swedish Academy of Sciences in Uppsala in 1958.

== Career in the church ==
In 1947 he became a vicar at Oscar's Church, and in 1950 pastor of Engelbrekt Parish, both in Stockholm. He also served as a military chaplain. In 1954 he was appointed Bishop of Stockholm. In this capacity, in 1960, he ordained one of the first three woman priests in the Church of Sweden, Elisabeth Djurle. He edited the magazine Vår Lösen from 1941 to 1951 and headed the organisation Pro Fide et Christianismo from 1974 to 1983.

== Personal life and death ==
Ljungberg married Ruth Sterner in 1928; they had two sons and a daughter. He died on 24 November 1983 and was buried in the cemetery of Danderyd church.

== Selected publications ==
- Den nordiska religionen och kristendomen (1938; doctoral dissertation)
- Fornnordisk livsåskådning (1943)
- Ansgar och Björke (1945)
- Hur kristendomen kom till Sverige (1946)
- Tor I (1947; first volume of a projected series on Thor and other thunder gods)
- Herdabrev till Stockholms stift (1954; pastoral letters)
- Röde Orm och Vite Krist (1980)
