= Henrik Svenungsson =

The Right Reverend Henrik Svenungsson
- Bishop of Stockholm
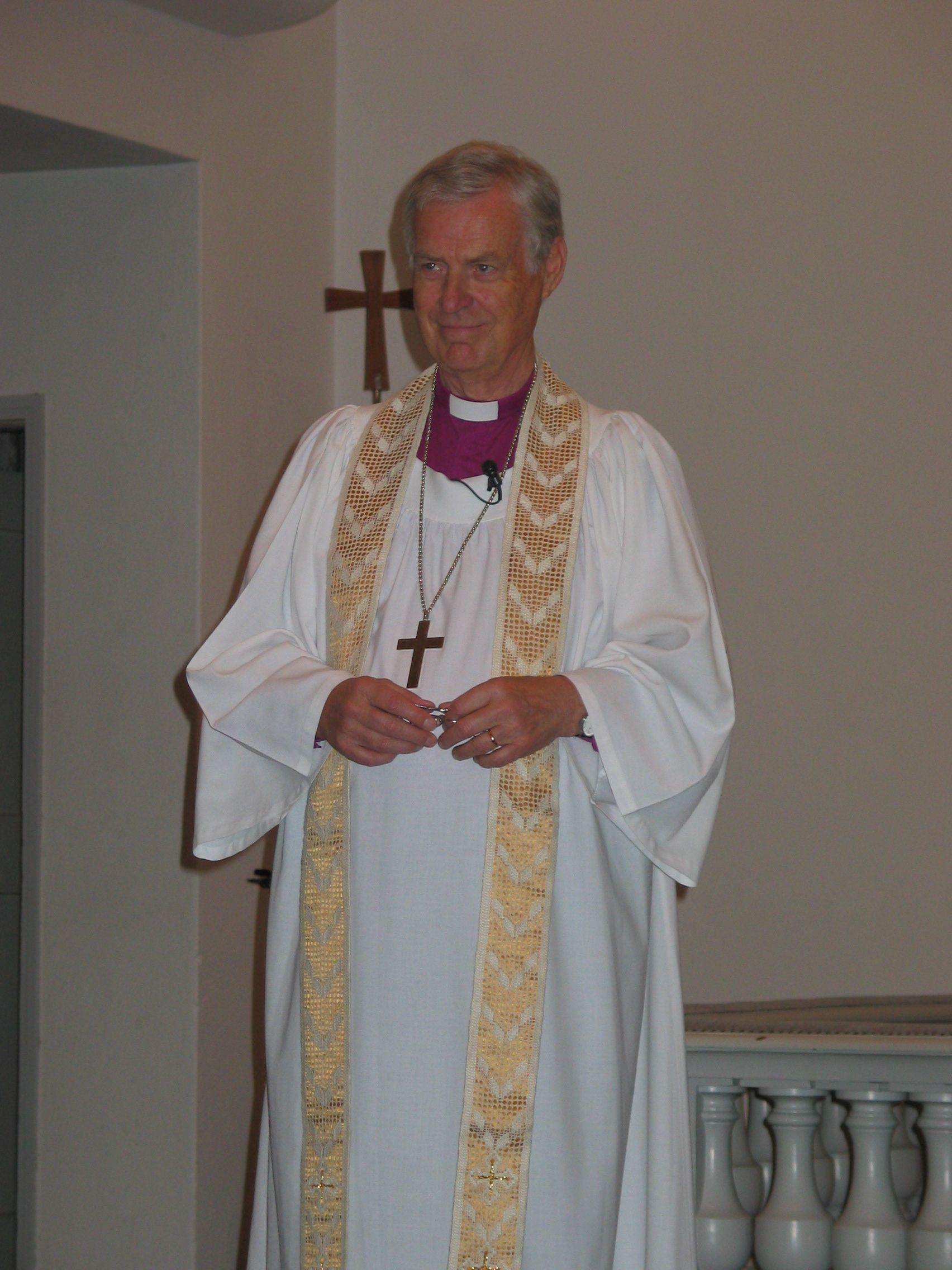
- Church: Church of Sweden
- Diocese: Stockholm
- In office: 1988–1998
- Predecessor: Krister Stendahl
- Successor: Caroline Krook

Orders
- Ordination: 20 December 1959
- Consecration: 9 October 1988 by Bertil Werkström

Personal details
- Born: 30 May 1933 Gothenburg, Sweden
- Died: 6 December 2017 (aged 84) Stockholm, Sweden
- Denomination: Lutheranism

Lars Henrik Sigfrid Svenungsson (30 May 1933 - 6 December 2017) was a Swedish prelate of the Church of Sweden who was Bishop of Stockholm between 1988 and 1998 and later chaplain of the Royal Household from 1997 till 2007.

== Biography ==
Svenungsson was born on 30 May 1933 in Gothenburg, Sweden, the son of governor Gunnar Svenungsson. He was ordained priest on 20 December 1959 in Kalmar. Throughout his priestly work, he worked for ecumenism and international cooperation. Since the beginning of the 1970s, Svenungsson had been involved in the ecumenical work in Europe, including in the European Church Conference where he has been a member of the Central Committee for some time. In 2003, he received the Luminosa Award for Unity for his long-standing pioneering work from the international Focolare Movement to create and maintain a good ecumenical dialogue between representatives of different Christian church traditions.

He was elected Bishop of Stockholm in 1988 and was consecrated by Archbishop Bertil Werkström of Uppsala on 9 October 1988. He retained the post till 1998. A year before his retirement he was appointed Chaplain of the Swedish Royal Household. In 1999 he was awarded the H. M. The King's Medal.

Church of Sweden titles
Preceded by Krister Stendahl	Bishop of Stockholm; 1988–1998	Succeeded by Caroline Krook
