= Caroline Krook =

Swedish bishop (1944–2025)

The Right Reverend Caroline Krook
- Bishop of Stockholm
- Church: Church of Sweden
- Diocese: Stockholm
- In office: 1998–2009
- Predecessor: Henrik Svenungsson
- Successor: Eva Brunne

Orders
- Ordination: 1969
- Consecration: 1998

Personal details
- Born: Märta Caroline Desirée Krook; 18 November 1944 Stockholm, Sweden
- Died: 16 August 2025 (aged 80) Stockholm, Sweden
- Denomination: Lutheranism
- Motto: Var brinnande i anden – tjäna Herren (Stay burning in the spirit - serve the Lord)

Märta Caroline Desirée Krook (18 November 1944 – 16 August 2025) was a Swedish bishop in the Church of Sweden. In 1990 she was appointed Dean of Storkyrkan.

== Biography ==
Krook was ordained in 1969 for the Diocese of Lund and was appointed a prison chaplain in Malmö, the first woman to do so in Sweden. She was the bishop of the Diocese of Stockholm from 1998 until her retirement in 2009, when she was succeeded by Eva Brunne. Krook lived in Stockholm. She died from lung cancer on 16 August 2025, at the age of 80.

Church of Sweden titles
| Preceded by Henrik Svenungsson | Bishop of Stockholm; 1998–2009 | Succeeded by Eva Brunne |
