= Ingmar Ström =

Swedish author and bishop (1912–2003)

The Right Reverend Ingmar Ström
- Bishop of Stockholm
- Church: Church of Sweden
- Diocese: Stockholm
- In office: 1971–1979
- Predecessor: Helge Ljungberg
- Successor: Lars Carlzon

Orders
- Ordination: 13 December 1941
- Consecration: 26 September 1971 by Ruben Josefson

Personal details
- Born: 21 May 1912 Solna Municipality, Sweden
- Died: 19 January 2003 (aged 90) Stockholm, Sweden
- Denomination: Lutheran
- Parents: Tord Valfrid & Agnes Palm
- Spouse: Karin Birgitta Faxén
- Children: 5

Ingmar Valter Lorens Ström (21 May 1912 - 19 January 2003) was a Swedish author and Bishop of Stockholm from 1971 till 1979.

== Biography ==
Ström was born on 21 May 1912 in Solna Municipality, Sweden, the son of the Reverend Tord Valfrid and Agnes Palm. He undertook a Bachelor of Literature at Uppsala University in 1936 and later studied theology in 1941. Between 1946 and 1959 he was editor-in-chief of the magazine Vår kyrka. In 1959 he was appointed director of the Church of Sweden's governing board, the Svenska kyrkans diakonistyrelse, which appointment was criticised by the conservative faction in the church, not just because of his support for female priests but also because he advocated increased democratisation within the church.

In 1971, he was elected Bishop of Stockholm and was consecrated in Uppsala Cathedral by Archbishop Ruben Josefson on 26 September 1971. However, two bishops, Bertil Gärtner and Helge Brattgård did not attend the consecration in protest against his appointment. As bishop, he ordained around 80 women to the priesthood. He was against any restrictions to abortion. He also encompassed liberal theological views concerning the Bible and the resurrection of Jesus, believing that rather than arguing whether Jesus rose from the dead or not, it is vital to look at such accounts as means how to develop a relationship with Christ whilst following his example. He retired in 1979 and lived till 2003 when he died on 19 January.
