= Andreas Holmberg (bishop) =

Bishop of Stockholm

The Right Reverend Andreas Holmberg
- Bishop of Stockholm
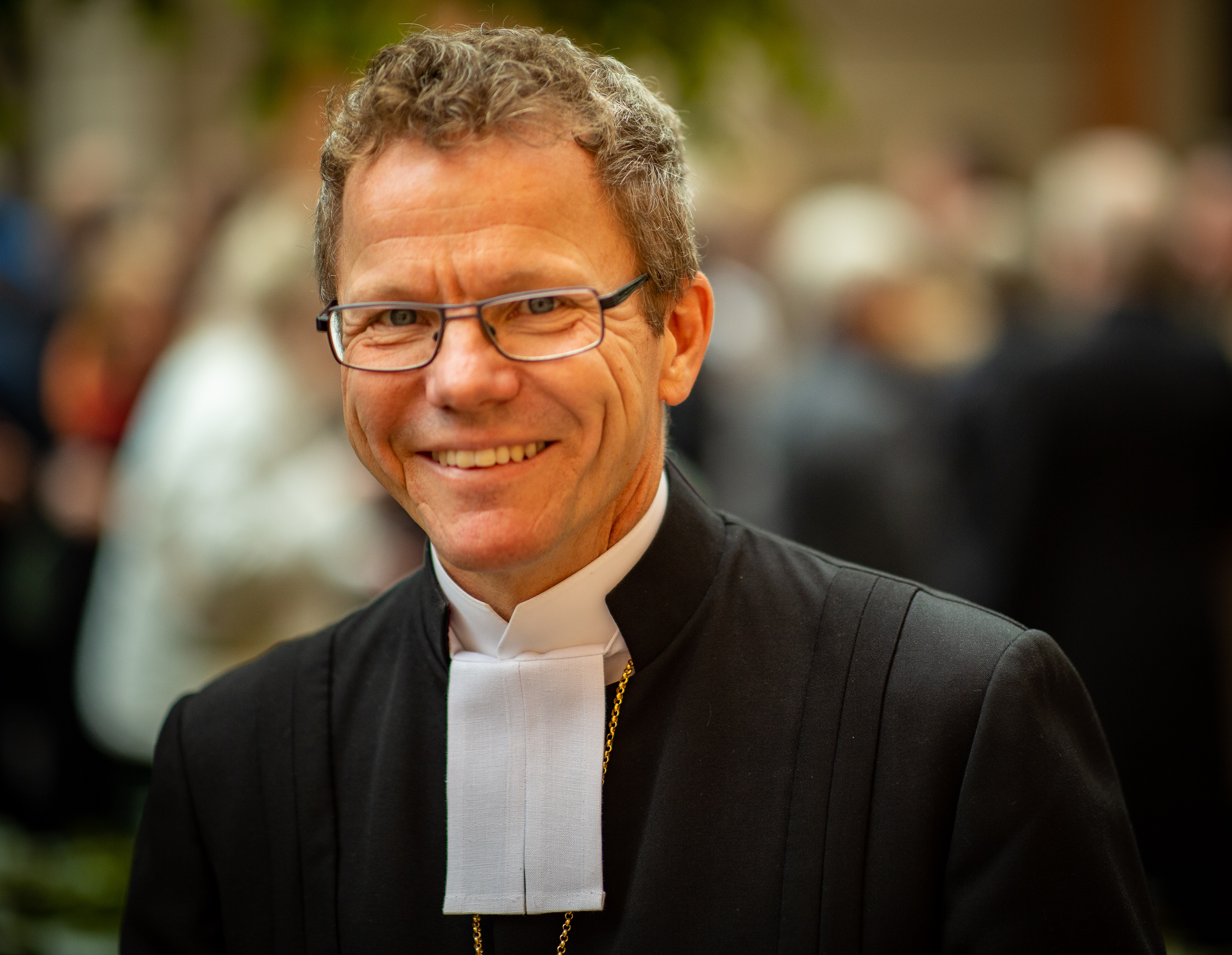
- Church: Church of Sweden
- Diocese: Stockholm
- Elected: 5 March 2019
- In office: 2019–present
- Predecessor: Eva Brunne

Orders
- Ordination: 1993 by Henrik Svenungsson
- Consecration: 22 September 2019 by Antje Jackelén

Personal details
- Born: 22 December 1966 (age 59) Lund, Sweden
- Denomination: Lutheranism
- Spouse: Cecilia Holmberg
- Children: 2
- Education: Uppsala University
- Motto: Bli kvar i min kärlek (Stay in my love)
- Coat of arms

Bengt Andreas Holmberg (born 22 December 1966 in Lund) is a Swedish prelate who is the current Bishop of Stockholm.

== Biography ==
Holmberg was born in 1966 and partly raised in Tanzania. He was ordained as a priest in 1993 for the Diocese of Stockholm. Since 2012, he has served as a diocesan deputy responsible for religious services. Previously, he worked as a parish priest in Stockholm and as a theological teacher in Tanzania. In 2019, he defended his thesis titled "The Church in the new landscape," which focuses on the theology emerging from Swedish church congregations operating in multi-cultural and multi-religious settings.

On 5 March 2019, Holmberg was elected bishop. His consecration took place on 22 September at Uppsala Cathedral by Archbishop Antje Jackelén. Holmberg is the son of priest Bengt Holmberg.

Church of Sweden titles
Preceded by Eva Brunne	Bishop of Stockholm; 2019–present	Incumbent
