= Eva Brunne =

Swedish bishop (born 1954)

The Right Reverend Eva Brunne
- Bishop of Stockholm
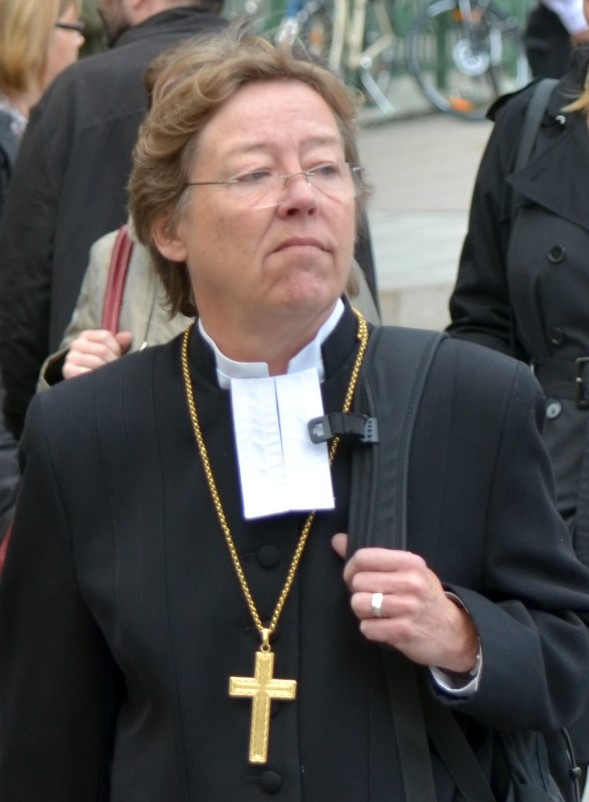
- Brunne in September 2012
- Church: Church of Sweden
- Diocese: Stockholm
- Elected: 26 May 2009
- In office: 2009–2019
- Predecessor: Caroline Krook
- Successor: Andreas Holmberg

Orders
- Consecration: 8 November 2009 by Anders Wejryd

Personal details
- Born: Gerd Eva Cecilia Brunne; 7 March 1954 (age 72) Malmö, Sweden
- Denomination: Lutheran
- Spouse: Gunilla Lindén
- Education: Lund University
- Motto: Don't show favouritism (James 2:1)
- Coat of arms

Gerd Eva Cecilia Brunne (born 7 March 1954) is a bishop in the Church of Sweden. She served as the Bishop of Stockholm from 2009 till 2019. She is the first openly lesbian bishop of a mainstream church in the world and the first bishop of the Church of Sweden to be in a registered same-sex partnership.

== Education and early career ==
Brunne was born in Malmö, where she also grew up, on 7 March 1954. Following college, she became a theology student at Lund University. She was ordained as a priest in 1978 and started serving in the Diocese of Lund, comprising Sweden's southernmost provinces of Blekinge and Scania. Brunne spent the first years of her priesthood in Karlskrona, Blekinge. In 1980, upon becoming Secretary General of the Swedish Student Christian Movement, Brunne took up a permanent residence in Stockholm. Before taking up the post of vicar of Sundbyberg parish in 1990, she functioned as university chaplain and bishop's adviser. Following eight years of vicarship in Sundbyberg, Brunne spent another eight years as vicar of Flemingsberg. In 2000, she became the head of Huddinge and Botkyrka deanery, serving as such until 2006.

== Episcopate ==
Having represented the clergy in the chapter of the Lutheran Diocese of Stockholm from 1997 until 2005, she became dean of the diocese in 2006. On 26 May 2009, Brunne was elected Bishop of Stockholm, succeeding Caroline Krook. She is the first openly lesbian bishop in the world and the first bishop of the Church of Sweden to have lived in a registered homosexual partnership. Brunne won the election by 413 votes to 365 and said: "It is very positive that our church is setting an example here and is choosing me as bishop based on my qualifications, when they also know that they can meet resistance elsewhere." On the official website of the Church of Sweden, Brunne wrote: "I know what it is to be called into question. I am in the lucky situation that I have power, and I can use it for the benefit of those who have no power."

Brunne was consecrated as bishop by Anders Wejryd, Archbishop of Uppsala, in Uppsala Cathedral on 8 November. King Carl XVI Gustaf and Queen Silvia attended the consecration. Five Anglican bishops, including the then-Archbishop of Canterbury Rowan Williams, declined the invitation to attend the ceremony, as did the representatives of the Lutheran World Federation and the churches of Iceland, Estonia, Latvia and Lithuania. Archbishop Wejryd denied that the clergy of the Church of England was boycotting the ceremony.

=== Coat of arms ===
Brunne confirmed that her coat of arms as Bishop of Stockholm consists of "the coat of arms for the Diocese of Stockholm, St Erik and the Swedish flag, as well as the Luther rose which was Martin Luther's own. The cross is a reminder that faith in the crucified and risen Christ gives bliss."

=== Riksdag opening incident ===
In October 2010, Bishop Brunne took part in a rally against racism in Stockholm, after the nationalist Sweden Democrats party entered the Riksdag. The following day, Brunne mentioned the demonstrations in a traditional church sermon that precedes the opening of the Riksdag. In response, Jimmie Åkesson and other members of the party stormed out of the church. Åkesson said that the Bishop obviously attacked his party in her speech. Brunne denied that the speech was directed against a specific party.

=== Removal of Christian symbols ===
In September 2015 Brunne proposed the removal of symbols of Christianity, including crosses, from the Seamen's Church in Stockholm Harbor, to open the church to worshipping sailors of all beliefs, and to mark the direction of Mecca as a service to Muslim visitors. As the Seamen's Church is an independent foundation and, while in Stockholm, not part of Brunne's Diocese of Stockholm, Kicki Wetterberg, the head of the Seamen's Church, rejected the suggestion in an interview with Dagen, stating that she had "no problem with Muslim or Hindu sailors worshipping in the church, but the church will keep its crosses, being a Christian church".

== Personal life ==
Since 2001, Brunne has been in a registered partnership with Gunilla Lindén, who is also an ordained priest of the Church of Sweden. The couple's relationship received a church blessing and the two have a son, born c. 2005.

Church of Sweden titles
Preceded by Caroline Krook	Bishop of Stockholm; 2009–present	Incumbent
