= Manfred Björkquist =

Swedish prelate

The Right Reverend Manfred Björkquist
- Bishop of Stockholm
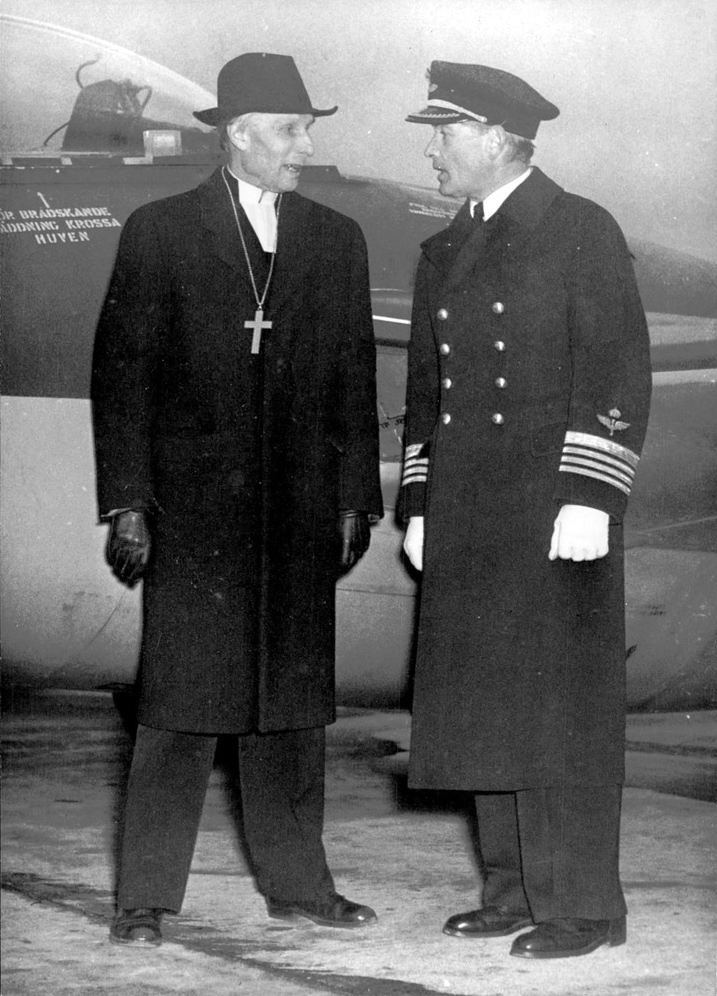
- Manfred Björkquist with Colonel Lars Gösta Hägglöf in 1950.
- Church: Church of Sweden
- Diocese: Stockholm
- In office: 1942–1954
- Successor: Helge Ljungberg

Orders
- Ordination: 6 October 1942
- Consecration: 29 November 1942 by Erling Eidem

Personal details
- Born: 22 June 1884 Gideå, Sweden
- Died: 23 November 1985 (aged 101) Sigtuna, Sweden
- Denomination: Lutheranism
- Parents: Jonas Erik Björkquist & Clementine Aurén.
- Spouse: Ruth Kjellén

Manfred Björkquist (22 June 1884 – 23 November 1985) was a Swedish prelate who was the Bishop of Stockholm from 1942 till 1954, and co-founder of Sigtunaskolan Humanistiska Läroverket. He was also the leader of the Young Church (Swedish: Ungkyrkorörelsen) conservative movement.
