= 2025 Swedish Church Assembly elections =

2025 elections in the Church of Sweden

- 21 September 2025

All 251 seats in the General Synod 126 seats needed for a majority

	First party	Second party	Third party
Party	Social Democrats	Non-Partisans	Centre
Last election	70 seats, 27.5%	47 seats, 19.3%	30 seats, 10.9%
Seats won	72	45	23
Seat change	▲2	▼2	▼7
Popular vote	232,330	145,256	74,565
Percentage	28.3%	17.7%	9.1%
Swing	▲0.8 pp	▼1.6 pp	▼1.8 pp
	Fourth party	Fifth party	Sixth party
Party	Bourgeois Christian Cooperation	Green	Open Church
Last election	27 seats, 10.8% (Note: Combined result of Bourgeois Alternative and Christian Democrats for a Living Church in 2021.)	8 seats, 3.3%	13 seats, 5.5%
Seats won	21	18	16
Seat change	▼6 (Note: Compared to the results of Bourgeois Alternative and Christian Democrats for a Living Church in 2021.)	▲10	▲3
Popular vote	69,705	59,907	51,824
Percentage	8.5%	7.3%	6.3%
Swing	▼2.3 pp	▲4.0 pp	▲0.8 pp
	Seventh party	Eighth party
Party	Sweden Democrats	Left
Last election	19 seats, 7.8%	19 seats, 7.6%
Seats won	16	15
Seat change	▼3	▼4
Popular vote	51,787	50,291
Percentage	6.3%	6.1%
Swing	▼1.5 pp	▼1.5 pp
- Largest nomination group by parish

The Swedish Church Assembly elections was held on 21 September 2025. All 251 seats in the General Synod of the Church of Sweden are up for election, as well as local governing bodies.

== Electoral system ==
All members of the Church of Sweden over the age of 16 and registered as living in a parish by 15 August 2025 may vote. The election takes place through proportional representation by lists presented by nominating groups, many of which are political parties or affiliated with political parties. The election is for the governing bodies of the Church of Sweden at the parish, diocese, and national level. Early and postal voting began on 8 September.

For the general synod election, 225 constituency seats are distributed in 13 constituencies corresponding to the dioceses. 24 of the seats are levelling seats, distributed to nomination groups to ensure that each group is represented in accordance with its national vote share. From 2025 onwards, a nomination group must receive at least 2% of the vote in order to be eligible to win seats. A group must also win at least one constituency seat, in order to be eligible to win levelling seats.

== Results ==
Party	Votes	%	Seats	+/–
Swedish Social Democratic Party (S)	232,330	28.25	72	+2
Non-partisans in the Church of Sweden (POSK)	145,256	17.66	45	−2
Centre Party (C)	74,565	9.07	23	−7
Bourgeois Christian Cooperation (BKS)	69,705	8.47	21	−6
Greens in the Church of Sweden (DGSK)	59,907	7.28	18	+10 (Note: Compared to Miljöpartister i Svenska kyrkan De Gröna in 2021.)
Open Church (ÖKA)	51,824	6.30	16	+3
Sweden Democrats (SDSK)	51,787	6.30	16	−3
The Left in the Church of Sweden (ViSK)	50,291	6.11	15	−4
Bold Church (FK)	28,434	3.46	9	+1
Free Liberals in the Church of Sweden (FiSK)	27,003	3.28	8	+4
Heaven and Earth (HoJ)	17,911	2.18	6	+5
Alternative for Sweden (AfS)	13,521	1.64	0	−3
Abroad voters			2	0
Total	822,534	100.00	251	0
Valid votes	822,534	97.91		
Invalid/blank votes	17,559	2.09		
Total votes	840,093	100.00		
Registered voters/turnout	4,720,453	17.80		
Source: Church of Sweden
