= 2021 Swedish Church Assembly elections =

- 19 September 2021

All 251 seats in the General Synod 126 seats needed for a majority

	First party	Second party	Third party
Party	Social Democrats	Non-partisans	Centre
Last election	76 seats, 30.3%	43 seats, 17.1%	34 seats, 13.7%
Seats won	70	47	30
Seat change	▼6	▲4	▼4
Popular vote	243,246	170,946	96,797
Percentage	27.5%	19.3%	10.9%
Swing	▼2.8 pp	▲2.3 pp	▼2.7 pp
	Fourth party	Fifth party	Sixth party
Party	Borgerligt alternativ	Sweden Democrats	Left
Last election	22 seats, 8.8%	24 seats, 9.3%	9 seats, 3.8%
Seats won	20	19	19
Seat change	▼2	▼5	▲10
Popular vote	71,046	68,941	67,519
Percentage	8.0%	7.8%	7.6%
Swing	▼0.8 pp	▼1.5 pp	▲3.9 pp
	Seventh party
Party	Open Church
Last election	11 seats, 4.4%
Seats won	13
Seat change	▲2
Popular vote	48,692
Percentage	5.5%
Swing	▲1.1 pp

The Swedish Church Assembly elections were held on 19 September 2021. All 251 seats in the General Synod of the Church of Sweden were up for election, as well as local governing bodies.

In church elections in Sweden all members of the Church of Sweden over the age of 16 may vote. It takes through proportional representation by lists presented by nominating groups, many of which are political parties or affiliated with political parties. The election is for the governing bodies of the Church of Sweden at the parish, diocese, and national level.

== Results ==
Summary of the 19 September 2021 Church of Sweden Assembly election results
Nominating group	Votes			Seats	
Nominating group	#	%	±	#	±
Swedish Social Democratic Party (S)	243,246	27.50%	–2.84%	70	–6
Non-Partisans in the Church of Sweden (POSK)	170,946	19.33%	+2.27%	47	+4
Centre Party (C)	96,797	10.94%	–2.75%	30	–4
Borgerligt alternativ (BorgA)	71,046	8.03%	–0.77%	20	–2
Sweden Democrats (SD)	68,941	7.79%	–1.48%	19	–5
The Left in the Church of Sweden (ViSK)	67,519	7.63%	+3.88%	19	+10
Open Church (ÖKA)	48,692	5.50%	+1.08%	13	+2
Bold Church (FK)	30,666	3.47%	–0.50%	8	–2
Greens in the Church of Sweden (MPSKDG)	28,806	3.26%	+0.88%	8	+2
Christian Democrats for a Living Church (KR)	24,170	2.73%	–0.24%	7	+0
Free Liberals in the Church of Sweden (FiSK)	14,211	1.61%	–1.33%	4	–3
Alternative for Sweden (AfS)	11,112	1.26%	–	3	New
Heaven and Earth (HoJ)	5,344	0.60%	–	1	New
Green Christians (GK)	2,011	0.23%	+0.06%	0	+0
Church Collaboration in Visby Diocese (KysV)	1,067	0.12%	-0.00%	0	+0
Abroad voters				2	+0
Totals	884,574	100.0	–	251	±0
Blank and invalid votes	16,179			–	–
Registered voters/turnout	4,898,123	18.39	-0.69	–	–
Source: kyrkoval.svenskakyrkan.se
