= 2009 Swedish Church Assembly elections =

On September 20, 2009, elections were held for all 251 seats in the General Synod of the Church of Sweden. Since the 1930s, nominating groups have often been directly affiliated with national political parties, but many groups are now established separately from political parties.

== Results ==
Party	Votes	%	Seats	+/–
Swedish Social Democratic Party	186,234	28.32	71	0
Centre Party	90,620	13.78	34	−7
Non-partisans in the Church of Sweden	86,567	13.16	33	−1
Folkpartister i Svenska kyrkan	34,580	5.26	13	−2
Frimodig kyrka	33,425	5.08	13	+6
Christian Democrats in the Church of Sweden	45,991	6.99	18	+1
Kyrklig samverkan i Visby stift	1,090	0.17	1	0
Greens in the Church of Sweden	20,764	3.16	8	+4
Moderate Party	106,383	16.18	41	−4
Senior Party	2,872	0.44	1	0
Sweden Democrats	18,815	2.86	7	+3
Vänstern i Svenska kyrkan	8,218	1.25	3	0
Open Church – a Church for All	21,568	3.28	8	+1
Skanör Falsterbo Kyrkans Väl	499	0.08	0	0
Total	657,626	100.00	251	0
Valid votes	657,626	97.90		
Invalid/blank votes	14,086	2.10		
Total votes	671,712	100.00		
