= 2013 Swedish Church Assembly elections =

- 15 September 2013

The Swedish Church Assembly elections were held on 15 September 2013. All 249 seats in the General Synod of the Church of Sweden were up for election, as well as local governing bodies.

In church elections in Sweden all members of the Church of Sweden over the age of 16 may vote. It takes through proportional representation by lists presented by nominating groups, many of which are political parties or affiliated with political parties. The election is for the governing bodies of the Church of Sweden at the parish, diocese, and national level.

== Results ==
Party	Votes	%	Seats	+/–
Swedish Social Democratic Party	199,588	29.37	73	+2
Non-partisans in the Church of Sweden	103,665	15.26	38	+5
Right-wing Alternative	85,386	12.57	31	−10
Centre Party	80,841	11.90	30	−4
Sweden Democrats	40,571	5.97	15	+8
Christian Democrats in the Church of Sweden	32,319	4.76	12	−6
Frimodig kyrka	32,313	4.76	12	−1
Greens in the Church of Sweden	31,880	4.69	12	+4
Open Church – a Church for All	31,479	4.63	11	+3
Free Liberals in the Church of Sweden	22,350	3.29	8	−5
The Left in the Church of Sweden	16,057	2.36	6	+3
Kyrklig samverkan i Visby stift	1,239	0.18	1	0
Swedish Senior Citizen Interest Party	331	0.05	0	0
Skanör Falsterbo Kyrkans väl	1,505	0.22	0	−1
Total	679,524	100.00	249	-2
Valid votes	679,524	97.66		
Invalid/blank votes	16,310	2.34		
Total votes	695,834	100.00		
