= 2005 Swedish Church Assembly elections =

Elections were held to the Church Assembly (Kyrkomötet), i.e. the "parliament" of the Church of Sweden on September 18, 2005. Simultaneously elections were held to diocese and parish assemblies all over the country.

The parties and church political outfits that take part in the elections are called 'nominating groups' (Nomineringsgrupper).

Party	Votes	%	Seats
Swedish Social Democratic Party	190,955	27.93	71
Moderate Party	121,914	17.83	45
Centerpartiet	111,686	16.33	41
Non-partisans in the Church of Sweden	93,277	13.64	34
Christian Democrats in the Church of Sweden	45,578	6.67	17
Folkpartister i Svenska kyrkan	40,687	5.95	15
Öppen Kyrka - en kyrka för alla	19,924	2.91	7
Frimodig kyrka	19,701	2.88	7
Sweden Democrats	11,877	1.74	4
Greens in the Church of Sweden	11,340	1.66	4
The Left in the Church of Sweden	7,759	1.13	3
SPI Seniorpartiet	3,782	0.55	1
Gabriel	3,376	0.49	1
Kyrklig samverkan i Visby stift	1,487	0.22	1
Elävä seurakunta - Levande församling	396	0.06	0
Total	683,739	100.00	251
Valid votes	683,739	98.17	
Invalid/blank votes	12,737	1.83	
Total votes	696,476	100.00	
