= 2017 Swedish Church Assembly elections =

- 17 September 2017

The Swedish Church Assembly elections were held on 17 September 2017. All 249 seats in the General Synod of the Church of Sweden were up for election, as well as local governing bodies.

In church elections in Sweden all members of the Church of Sweden over the age of 16 may vote. It takes through proportional representation by lists presented by nominating groups, many of which are political parties or affiliated with political parties. The election is for the governing bodies of the Church of Sweden at the parish, diocese, and national level.

== Results ==
Party	Votes	%	Seats	+/–
Swedish Social Democratic Party	293,795	30.34	76	+3
Non-partisans in the Church of Sweden	165,171	17.06	43	+5
Centre Party	132,594	13.69	34	+4
Sweden Democrats	89,819	9.28	24	+9
Right-wing Alternative (BorgA)	85,216	8.80	22	-9
Open Church – a Church for All (ÖKA)	42,777	4.42	11	0
Frimodig kyrka	38,440	3.97	10	-2
The Left in the Church of Sweden	36,365	3.76	9	+3
Christian Democrats in the Church of Sweden	28,730	2.97	7	-5
Free Liberals in the Church of Sweden	28,519	2.95	7	-1
Greens in the Church of Sweden	23,008	2.38	6	-6
Green Christians	1,598	0.17	0	0
Kyrklig samverkan i Visby stift	1,202	0.12	0	0
The Way (Vägen)	762	0.08	0	0
Safety Party in the Church of Sweden	377	0.04	0	0
Total	968,373	100.00	249	0
Valid votes	968,373	98.35		
Invalid/blank votes	16,227	1.65		
Total votes	984,600	100.00		
