= 2017 in religion =

This is a timeline of events during the year 2017 which relate to religion.

== Events ==
- January 29 – A Quebec City mosque was the subject of a mass shooting. There were six deaths and numerous others injured.
- 20 April – The International Church of Cannabis opens in Denver, Colorado.
- 6 May – The Lokstene Shrine of Dievturi, a Dievturi monument in Latvia, opens.
- 12–22 May – The 4th Islamic Solidarity Games are held in Baku, Azerbaijan.
- June
  - Samoa becomes a Christian state. Article 1 of the Samoan Constitution states that “Samoa is a Christian nation founded of God the Father, the Son and the Holy Spirit”.
  - The Cologne Central Mosque is opened for prayers in Cologne, Germany.
  - The liberal Ibn Rushd-Goethe Mosque opens in Berlin, Germany.
- 29 August – Evangelical church leaders in the United States publish the Nashville Statement advocating monogamy and heterosexuality.
- 17 September – The Church of Sweden holds elections for its assembly.
- 31 October – Germany celebrates the 500th anniversary of Reformation Day.
- 19 November – The Catholic Church observes the first annual World Day of the Poor.
- 8 December– The Basilica of the National Shrine of the Immaculate Conception is completed and dedicated after a century of construction.
- 29 December – An Islamic State gunman attacks the Church of Saint Menas in Cairo, Egypt.

=== Undated ===
- The Synagogue Edmond Safra opens in Monaco.
