= Trelleborg (disambiguation) =

Trelleborg may refer to:

- Viking ring castles, colloquially known as "Trelleborgs"
  - Trelleborg (Slagelse), a Viking ring castle in Denmark
- Trelleborg, Sweden's southernmost city, the seat of Trelleborg Municipality, and location of a viking ring castle
  - Trelleborg Municipality the southernmost municipality of Sweden
  - Trelleborg Parish, a parish of the Church of Sweden
- Trelleborg AB, a Swedish company
- M/S Trelleborg, name of two ships built in 1958 and 1982
