= Elävä seurakunta – Levande församling =

Elävä seurakunta – Levande församling (Finnish/Swedish for 'Living Congregation') is a nominating group for the elections to assemblies of the Church of Sweden. The group is based in Stockholm, and aims to promote Finnish-Swedish bilingualism in the Church. The group is opposed to same-sex marriage.

The group made its electoral debut in the 2005 Church elections, but did not win any seats in the Church Assembly. It only presented a list in one diocese, the Diocese of Stockholm. The group also contested in the election to the Diocese Council of Stockholm. It was able to win 19.7% of the votes in the election to the Finnish Parish Council in Stockholm, winning four seats and two alternate seats.
