= Greens in the Church of Sweden =

The Greens in the Church of Sweden (Swedish: De Gröna i Svenska kyrkan), formerly Green Party Members in the Church of Sweden (Swedish: Miljöpartister i Svenska kyrkan De Gröna) is a nominating group that stands in church elections within the Church of Sweden. The group changed to its new name ahead of the 2025 church elections.

== History ==
The Green Party in the Church of Sweden ran for the first time in the 2005 church election. They received 1.66 percent of the vote and four seats in the church council. Terence Hongslo was appointed group leader. After the 2009 church election, he was succeeded as group leader in the church council by Ylva Wahlström. During the last few terms of office, Marja Sandin Wester has been group leader.

In the 2009 church election, the Greens in the Church of Sweden received 3.16 percent and doubled the number of seats in the church council to eight. At the diocesan level, the number of seats increased from 8 to 24, distributed among 12 of the 13 dioceses.

== Election results for the church council ==
Year	Votes	%	Seats	Ref.
2005	11,340	1.66 %	4	
2009	20,764	3.16 %	8	
2013	31,880	4.69 %	12	
2017	23,088	2.38 %	6	
2021	28,806	3.26 %	8	
2025	65,053	7.46 %	19	

The election results in the 2025 church election represented a sharp increase, to over 65,000 votes, which constituted 7.46 percent of the votes, giving 19 seats in the church council. This represented more than a doubling compared to the 2021 election.
