= Non-partisans in the Church of Sweden =

Non-partisans in the Church of Sweden (POSK) (Swedish: Partipolitiskt obundna i Svenska kyrkan) is a nominating group working with the Church of Sweden. POSK was founded in 1987 as a platform for independents to contest church elections. POSK is by far the largest non-party nominating group. POSK is represented in the Kyrkomötet (or Church Assembly) and in all Diocese Assemblies of the country.

POSK claims to be against partisan politics inside the church.

POSK wants to reform the electoral system of the church, and remove it from party politics.

In the 2001 elections POSK won 36 out of 251 seats in the Church Assembly. In 2005 POSK passed through a split, as a group opposed to same-sex blessings left it to form Frimodig kyrka.

In the 2005 elections POSK got 13.6% and 34 seats.

In the 2009 elections POSK got 13.2% and 33 seats.

In the 2013 elections POSK got 15.3% and 38 seats.

In the 2017 elections POSK got 17.1% and 43 seats.

In the 2021 elections POSK got 19.3% and 47 seats.

In the 2025 elections POSK got 17.5% and 45 seats.
