= Angered Parish =

Coordinates: 57°47′39″N 12°03′49″E

The Angered Parish (Swedish: Angereds församling) is a parish in the Diocese of Gothenburg, Gothenburg Municipality, Västergötland. Angered had 21501 inhabitants in 2024.

The Angered district has about 20 antiquities, some Stone Age settlements and scattered Iron Age tombs, most now removed. The stone church without a tower is probably from the 13th century, and a choir and porch to the west were added in 1791. The wooden barrel vault and interior has 18th century painting decorations and the sacristy was built in 1929.
