= Synagogue Edmond Safra =

Synagogue in Monaco

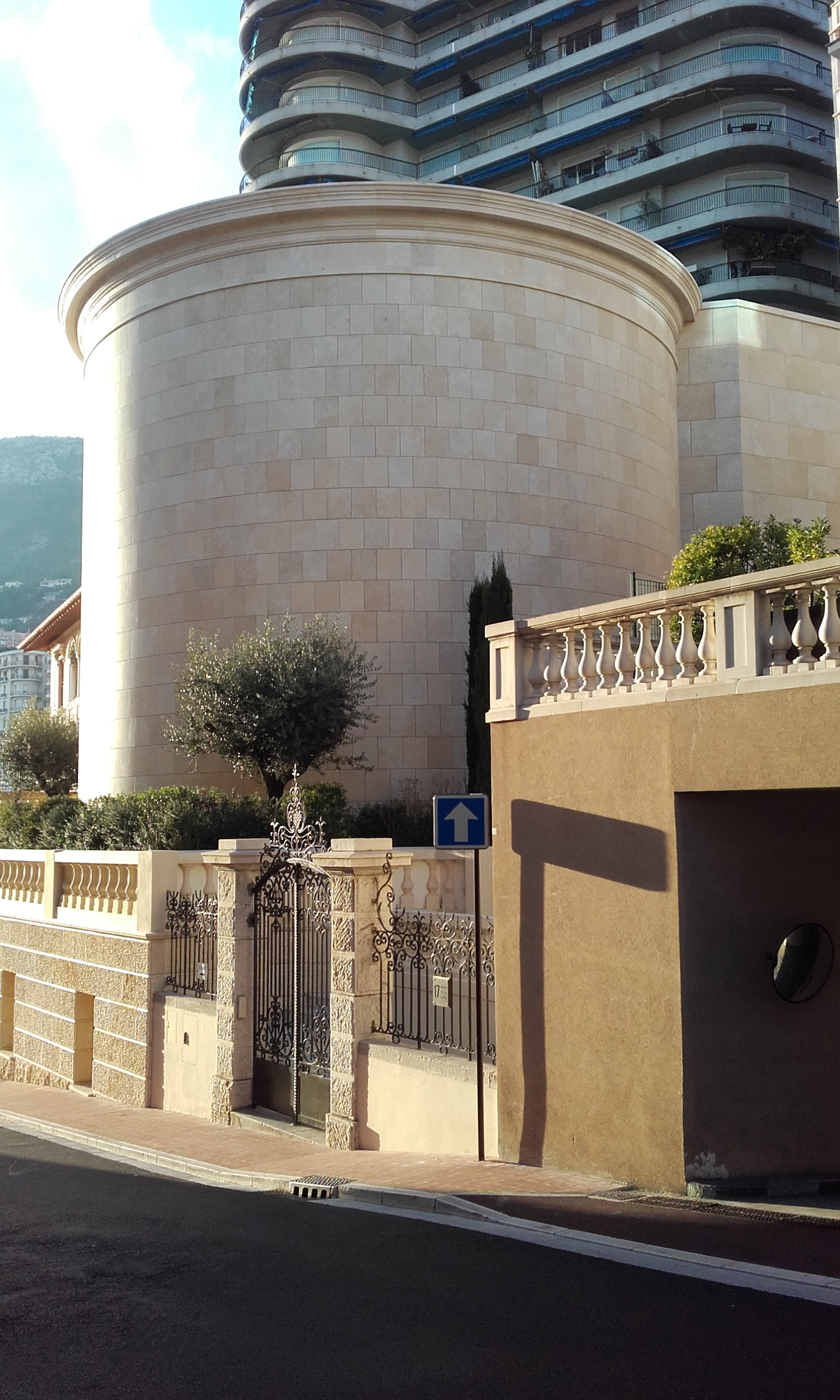
- The synagogue in December 2017

- Location of the synagogue in Monaco

Religion
- Affiliation: Orthodox Judaism
- Rite: Nusach Ashkenaz
- Ecclesiastical or organizational status: Synagogue
- Ownership: Association Cultuelle Israelite de Monaco
- Status: Active

Location
- Location: 15 avenue de la Costa, Monte Carlo
- Country: Monaco
- Interactive map of Synagogue Edmond Safra
- Coordinates: 43°44′17″N 7°25′24″E

Architecture
- Architects: Thierry Despont; Suzanne Belaieff
- Type: Synagogue architecture
- Style: Modernist
- Funded by: Edmond J. Safra Philanthropic Foundation
- General contractor: J.B. Pastor & Fils
- Groundbreaking: 2015
- Completed: 2017
- Materials: Concrete

Website
- acimmonaco.com

The Synagogue Edmond Safra is an Orthodox Jewish congregation and synagogue, located at 15 avenue de la Costa, in Monte Carlo, in Monaco. The synagogue is run by the Association Cultuelle Israelite de Monaco (ACIM).

The synagogue is one of several that are eponymous with Edmond J. Safra (1932-1999), a banker and philanthropist, partially or fully funded by the Edmond J. Safra Foundation.

== History ==
Designed by Thierry Despont and Suzanne Belaieff in the Modernist style, the synagogue was built by J.B. Pastor & Fils and completed in 2017 after a construction period of a year and five months. The synagogue was inaugurated in March 2017 in a ceremony attended by Albert II, Prince of Monaco and Aliza Bin-Noun, the Israeli ambassador to France and Monaco.

== See also ==
- History of the Jews in Monaco
