= Lammhult Parish =

Parish of the Church of Sweden

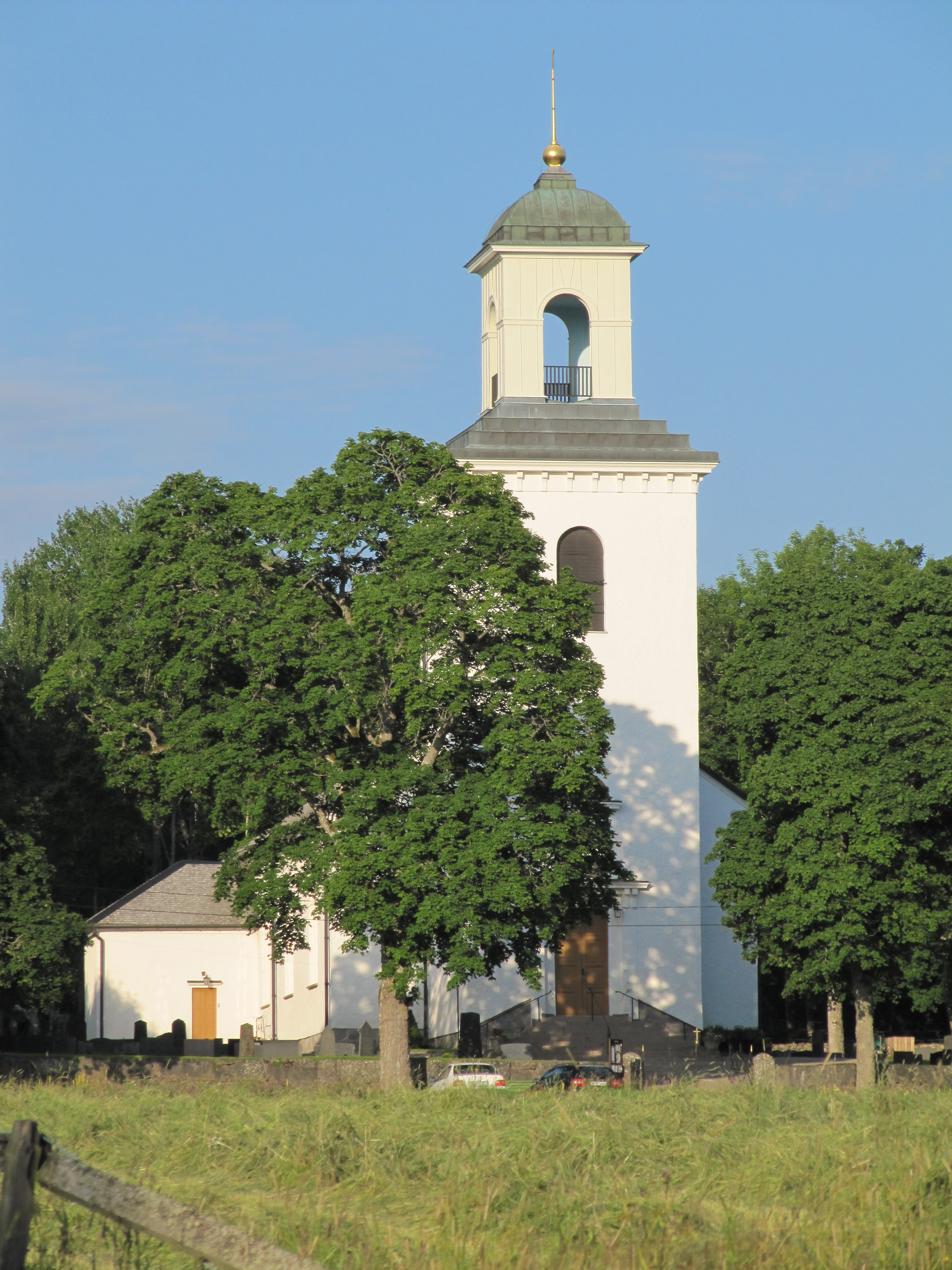
Asa Kyrta

Lammhult Parish (Swedish: Lammhults församling) is a parish of the Church of Sweden in Växjö Pastorate, Växjö Municipality, Kronoberg County, Sweden. It was formed in 2010 through the merger of the former parishes Aneboda, Asa and Berg, at which time it was called Aneboda-Asa-Berg. In 2014, the parish was renamed Lammhult Parish, and at the same time it became part of the newly-formed Växjö pastorate.
