= List of dioceses, deaneries and parishes of the Church of Sweden =

This is a list of dioceses, deaneries and parishes of Church of Sweden January 1, 2013. There were then 13 dioceses, 130 deaneries and 1,426 parishes.

The dioceses, deaneries and parishes are ordered after diocese code, deanery code and parish code.

Note: this list only contains parishes of the Church of Sweden.

== Diocese of Uppsala ==
- Deanery of Uppsala
  - Uppsala cathedral parish
  - Helga Trefaldighet parish
  - Vaksala parish
  - Danmark-Funbo parish
  - Gamla Uppsala parish
  - Gottsunda Parish
- Deanery of Oland and Frösåker
  - Frösåker parish
  - Alunda parish
  - Öregrund-Gräsö parish
  - Hökhuvud parish
  - Ekeby parish
  - Skäfthammar parish
  - Dannemorabygden parish
  - Rasbo parish
  - Rasbokil parish
  - Tuna parish
  - Stavby parish
- Deanery of Eastern Uppland
  - Rimbo parish
  - Husby, Skederid and Rö parish
  - Fasterna parish
  - Närtuna parish
  - Gottröra parish
  - Rådmansö parish
  - Frötuna parish
  - Norrtälje-Malsta parish
  - Länna parish
  - Blidö parish
  - Riala parish
  - Roslagsbro-Vätö parish
  - Almunge parish
  - Knutby-Bladåker parish
  - Faringe parish
  - Häverö-Edebo-Singö parish
  - Väddö parish
  - Björkö-Arholma parish
  - Estuna and Söderby-Karl parish
  - Lohärad parish
  - Edsbro-Ununge parish
- Deanery of Enköping
  - Veckholm parish
  - Boglösa parish
  - Villberga parish
  - Enköping parish
  - Tillinge and Södra Åsunda parish
  - Sparrsätra-Bred parish
  - Fjärdhundra parish
  - Lagunda parish
- Deanery of Sigtuna
  - Husby-Ärlinghundra parish
  - Norrsunda parish
  - Skepptuna parish
  - Valsta parish
  - Sigtuna parish
  - Knivsta parish
  - Alsike parish
  - Lagga parish
  - Östuna parish
  - Vassunda parish
  - Husby-Långhundra parish
  - Övergran parish
  - Kalmar-Yttergran parish
  - Skokloster parish
  - Häggeby parish
  - Kungsängen-Västra Ryd parish
  - Bro parish
- Deanery of Western Uppland
  - Bälingebygden parish
  - Norra Hagunda parish
  - Tensta parish
  - Lena parish
  - Ärentuna parish
  - Björklinge parish
  - Skuttunge parish
  - Viksta parish
  - Balingsta parish
  - Hagby parish
  - Ramsta parish
  - Uppsala-Nä parish
  - Västeråker parish
  - Dalby parish
  - Vittinge parish
  - Västerlövsta parish
  - Enåker parish
  - Huddunge parish
  - Östervåla parish
  - Harbo parish
  - Nora parish
- Deanery of Örbyhus
  - Tierp-Söderfors parish
  - Hållnäs-Österlövsta parish
  - Älvkarleby-Skutskär parish
  - Västland parish
  - Tolfta parish
  - Vendel parish
  - Tegelsmora parish
- Deanery of Gästrikland
  - Gävle Heliga Trefaldighet parish
  - Gävle Staffan parish
  - Valbo parish
  - Hille parish
  - Hedesunda parish
  - Hamrånge parish
  - Gävle Maria parish
  - Bomhus parish
  - Ockelbo parish
  - Torsåker parish
  - Hofors parish
  - Ovansjö parish
  - Järbo parish
  - Årsunda-Österfärnebo parish
  - Sandviken parish
- Deanery of Southern Hälsingland
  - Söderala parish
  - Ljusne parish
  - Mo-Bergvik parish
  - Skog parish
  - Söderhamn parish
  - Sandarne parish
  - Norrala-Trönö parish
  - Bollnä parish
  - Rengsjö parish
  - Arbrå-Undersvik parish
  - Alfta-Ovanåker parish
  - Hanebo-Segersta parish
- Deanery of Northern Hälsingland
  - Järvsö parish
  - Ljusdal-Ramsjö parish
  - Färila-Kårböle parish
  - Los-Hamra parish
  - Hudiksvall-Idenor parish
  - Delsbo parish
  - Forsa-Hög parish
  - Enånger-Njutånger parish
  - Hälsingtuna-Rogsta parish
  - Bjuråker-Norrbo parish
  - Harmånger-Jättendal parish
  - Gnarp parish
  - Bergsjö parish
  - Ilsbo parish
  - Hassela parish

== Diocese of Linköping ==
- Cathedral deanery
  - Linköping cathedral parish
  - Gottfridsberg parish
  - Linköping Saint Lawrence parish
  - Linköping Johannelund parish
  - Linköping Skäggetorp parish
  - Linköping Ryd parish
  - Linköping Berga parish
  - Landeryd parish
- Deanery of Motala and Bergslag
  - Motala parish
  - Aska parish
  - Vadstena parish
  - Dal parish
  - Fornåsa parish
  - Borensberg parish
  - Klockrike parish
  - Tjällmo parish
  - Finspång parish
  - Västra Ny parish
  - Godegård parish
- Deanery of Folkungabygden
  - Skänninge parish
  - Boxholm parish
  - Ödeshög parish
  - Veta parish
  - Viby parish
  - Västra Harg parish
  - Östra Tollstad parish
  - Mjölby parish
  - Väderstad parish
- Deanery of Norrköping
  - Norrköping Saint Olof parish
  - Norrköping Saint John parish
  - Kolmården parish
  - Norrköping Borg parish
- Deanery of Söderköping
  - Östra Husby parish
  - Jonsberg parish
  - Västra Vikbolandet parish
  - Söderköping Saint Anna parish
  - Valdemarsvik parish
  - Ringarum parish
  - Östra Ryd parish
  - Åtvid parish
- Deanery of Tjust
  - Västervik parish
  - Hjorted parish
  - Hallingeberg-Blackstad parish
  - Gladhammar-Västrum parish
  - Törnsfall parish
  - Misterhult parish
  - Gamleby parish
  - Odensvi parish
  - Lofta parish
  - Överum parish
  - Dalhem parish
  - Västra Ed parish
  - Ukna parish
  - Loftahammar parish
- Deanery of Sevede and Aspeland
  - Vimmerby parish
  - Tuna parish
  - Rumskulla parish
  - Pelarne parish
  - Frödinge parish
  - Locknevi parish
  - Södra Vi-Djursdala parish
  - Hultsfred parish
  - Vena parish
  - Lönneberga parish
  - Mörlunda-Tveta parish
  - Virserum parish
  - Järeda parish
  - Målilla with Gårdveda parish
- Deanery of Vedbo and Ydre
  - Aneby parish
  - Askeryd parish
  - Frinnaryd parish
  - Lommaryd parish
  - Haurida-Vireda parish
  - Säby parish
  - Linderå parish
  - Adelöv parish
  - Norra Ydre parish
  - Sund-Svinhult parish
  - Västra Ryd parish
  - Eksjö parish
  - Höreda parish
  - Mellby parish
  - Hult parish
  - Edshult parish
  - Norra Solberga-Flisby parish
  - Hässleby-Kråkshult parish
  - Ingatorp-Bellö parish
- Deanery of Stångå
  - Vreta kloster parish
  - Kärna parish
  - Kaga parish
  - Ledberg parish
  - Skeda parish
  - Slaka parish
  - Åkerbo parish
  - Nykil-Gammalkil parish
  - Ulrika parish
  - Vikingstad parish
  - Vist parish
  - Vårdnä parish
  - Rimforsa parish
  - Kisa parish
  - Västra Eneby parish
  - Tidersrum parish
  - Horn parish
  - Hycklinge parish

== Diocese of Skara ==
- Deanery of Skara-Barne
  - Skara cathedral parish
  - Ardala parish
  - Varnhem parish
  - Eggby-Öglunda parish
  - Axvall parish
  - Vara parish
  - Levene parish
  - Ryda parish
  - Larv parish
  - Vedum parish
  - Kvänum parish
  - Essunga parish
  - Lekåsa-Barne Åsaka parish
  - Främmestad-Bäreberg parish
  - Tengene parish
  - Trökörna parish
  - Fridhem parish
  - Särestad parish
  - Flo parish
- Deanery of Väne
  - Vänersborg and Väne-Ryr parish
  - Västra Tunhem parish
  - Gärdhem parish
  - Åsaka-Björke parish
  - Vänersnä parish
  - Trollhättan parish
  - Lextorp parish
  - Götalunden parish
  - Fors-Rommele parish
  - Upphärad parish
- Deanery of Falköping
  - Falköping parish
  - Mösseberg parish
  - Slöta-Karleby parish
  - Åslebygden parish
  - Yllestad parish
  - Stenstorp parish
  - Hornborga parish
  - Dala-Borgunda-Högstena parish
  - Gudhem parish
  - Floby parish
  - Kinneved parish
  - Åsarp parish
- Deanery of Hökensås
  - Mullsjö-Sandhem parish
  - Habo parish
  - Gustav Adolf parish
  - Brandstorp parish
  - Tidaholm parish
  - Hökensås parish
  - Fröjered parish
  - Valstad parish
  - Varv parish
- Deanery of Kålland-Kinne
  - Lidköping parish
  - Sunnersberg parish
  - Örslösa parish
  - Kållands-Råda parish
  - Sävare parish
  - Järpå parish
  - Götene parish
  - Kinnekulle parish
  - Källby parish
  - Husaby parish
  - Kleva-Sil parish
  - Ledsjö parish
- Deanery of Kåkind
  - Hjo parish
  - Mofalla parish
  - Fågelå parish
  - Korsberga-Fridene parish
  - Tibro parish
  - Ransberg parish
  - Karlsborg parish
  - Mölltorp parish
  - Brevik parish
  - Undenä parish
- Deanery of Vadsbo
  - Amnehärad parish
  - Lyrestad parish
  - Finnerödja-Tived parish
  - Töreboda parish
  - Fredsberg-Bäck parish
  - Fägre parish
  - Hova-Älgarå parish
  - Mariestad parish
  - Ullervad parish
  - Lugnå parish
- Deanery of Billing
  - Skövde parish
  - Ryd parish
  - Våmb parish
  - Skultorp parish
  - Värsås-Varola-Vreten parish
  - Sventorp-Forsby parish
  - Väring parish
  - Frösve parish
  - Berg parish
  - Götlunda parish
- Deanery of Redväg
  - Norra Mo parish
  - Ulricehamn parish
  - Timmele parish
  - Hössna parish
  - Norra Hestra parish
  - Redväg parish
  - Södra Ving parish
  - Hällstad parish
  - Åsunden parish
- Deanery of Ås
  - Borås Caroli parish
  - Borås Gustav Adolf parish
  - Brämhult parish
  - Fristad parish
  - Toarp parish
  - Rångedala parish
  - Äspered parish
  - Sandhult parish
  - Bredared parish
- Deanery of Kulling
  - Alingså parish
  - Ödenä parish
  - Hemsjö parish
  - Algutstorp parish
  - Lena parish
  - Hol parish
  - Nårunga parish
  - Asklanda parish
  - Bjärke parish
  - Herrljunga parish
  - Herrljunga landsbygdsparish
  - Hov parish
  - Östra Gäsene parish
  - Hudene parish

== Diocese of Strängnäs ==
- Cathedral deanery
  - Strängnäs cathedral parish with Aspö
  - Mariefred parish
  - Vårfruberga-Härad parish
  - Stallarholmen parish
  - Åker-Länna parish
  - Daga parish
  - Frustuna parish
- Deanery of Oppunda and Villåttinge
  - Katrineholmsbygden parish
  - Västra Vingåker parish
  - Österåker parish
  - Björkvik parish
  - Flen, Helgesta-Hyltinge parish
  - Dunker-Lilla Malma parish
  - Mellösa parish
  - Bettna parish
- Deanery of Nyköping
  - Kiladalen parish
  - Nyköping Saint Nicolai parish
  - Nyköping Alla Helgona parish
  - Oxelösund parish
  - Stigtomta-Vrena parish
  - Tunaberg parish
  - Rönö parish
  - Tystbergabygden parish
- Deanery of Södertälje
  - Enhörna parish
  - Hölö-Mörkö parish
  - Södertälje parish
  - Turinge-Taxinge parish
  - Överjärna parish
  - Ytterjärna parish
  - Vårdinge parish
  - Östertälje parish
  - Trosa parish
- Deanery of Rekarne
  - Eskilstuna parish
  - Torshälla parish
  - Hällby parish with Tumbo and Råby-Rekarne
  - Västra Rekarne parish
  - Husby-Rekarne parish
  - Näshulta parish
  - Kafjärden parish
  - Stenkvista-Ärla parish
- Deanery of Örebro
  - Almby parish
  - Längbro parish
  - Örebro Nikolai parish
  - Örebro Olaus Petri parish
  - Adolfsberg parish
  - Mosjö-Täby parish
  - Mikael parish
- Deanery of Glanshammar and Edsberg
  - Axberg parish
  - Glanshammar parish
  - Tysslinge parish
  - Edsberg parish
  - Knista parish
  - Ramundeboda parish
  - Skagershult parish
  - Viby parish
- Deanery of Kumla and Asker
  - Askersund parish
  - Hallsberg parish
  - Hammar parish
  - Kumla parish
  - Hardemo parish
  - Ekeby parish
  - Lerbäck parish
  - Snavlunda parish
  - Asker parish
  - Lännä parish
  - Sköllersta parish
  - Stora Mellösa parish
  - Gällersta-Norrbyå parish
- Deanery of Nynäs
  - Grödinge parish
  - Nynäshamn parish
  - Salem parish
  - Sorunda parish
  - Ösmo-Torö parish

== Diocese of Västerås ==
- Cathedral deanery
  - Västerås cathedral parish
  - Västerås Lundby parish
  - Västerås Badelunda parish
  - Skerike-Gideonsberg parish
  - Dingtuna-Lillhärad parish
  - Västerås-Barkarö parish
  - Rytterne parish
  - Kungsåra parish
  - Norrbo parish
  - Tillberga parish
  - Önsta parish
- Deanery of Southern Västmanland
  - Köpingsbygden parish
  - Malma parish
  - Arbogabygden parish
  - Kungsör parish
  - Hallstahammar-Berg parish
  - Kolbäck-Säby parish
  - Ramnä parish
  - Sura parish
- Deanery of Bergslagen
  - Fellingsbro parish
  - Linde bergslag parish
  - Guldsmedshyttan parish
  - Näsby parish
  - Nora bergslagsparish
  - Ljusnarsberg parish
  - Grythyttan parish
  - Hällefors-Hjulsjö parish
- Deanery of Västerbergslagen
  - Norrbärke parish
  - Söderbärke parish
  - Gränge-Säfsnä parish
  - Ludvika parish
  - Järna with Nås and Äppelbo parish
- Deanery of Northern Dalarna
  - Mora parish
  - Älvdalen parish
  - Idre-Särna parish
  - Orsa parish
  - Malung parish
  - Lima-Transtrand parish
- Deanery of Tuna
  - Stora Tuna parish
  - Torsång parish
  - Säterbygden parish
  - Hedemora-Garpenberg parish
  - Husby parish
  - Folkärna parish
  - By parish
  - Grytnä parish
  - Avesta parish
- Deanery of Falu-Nedansiljan
  - Falu Kristine parish
  - Stora Kopparberg parish
  - Aspeboda parish
  - Grycksbo parish
  - Vika-Hosjö parish
  - Svärdsjö parish
  - Enviken parish
  - Sundborn parish
  - Bjurså parish
  - Leksand parish
  - Djura parish
  - Siljansnä parish
  - Gagnef parish
  - Mockfjärd parish
  - Floda parish
  - Ål parish
  - Rättvik parish
  - Boda parish
  - Ore parish
- Deanery of Northern Västmanland
  - Norberg-Karbenning parish
  - Västanfors-Västervåla parish
  - Skinnskatteberg with Hed and Gunnilbo parish
  - Sala parish, Sweden
  - Norrby parish
  - Möklinta parish
  - Kumla parish
  - Tärna parish
  - Kila parish
  - Västerfärnebo-Fläckebo parish

== Diocese of Växjö ==
- Deanery of Eastern Värend
  - Växjö cathedral parish
  - Hemmesjö with Tegnaby parish
  - Furuby parish
  - Skogslyckan parish
  - Öjaby parish
  - Ör-Ormesberga parish
  - Bergunda parish
  - Öja parish
  - Lammhults parish
  - Teleborg parish
  - Vederslöv-Dänningelanda parish
  - Kalvsvik parish
  - Tävelså parish
  - Växjö Maria parish
  - Tingså parish
  - Väckelsång parish
  - Södra Sandsjö parish
  - Linneryd parish
  - Älmeboda parish
  - Urshult parish
  - Almundsryd parish
  - Hovmantorp parish
  - Ljuder parish
  - Lessebo parish
  - Ekeberga parish
  - Östra Torså parish
  - Nöbbele parish
  - Uråsa parish
  - Jät parish
  - Åseda parish
  - Nottebäck parish
  - Älghult parish
  - Lenhovda-Herråkra parish
  - Sjöså parish
  - Dädesjö parish
  - Söraby, Tolg and Tjureda parish
  - Gårdsby parish
- Deanery of Allbo-Sunnerbo
  - Göteryd parish
  - Pjätteryd parish
  - Hallaryd parish
  - Traryd parish
  - Hinneryd parish
  - Markaryd parish
  - Berga parish
  - Vittaryd parish
  - Dörarp parish
  - Bolmsö parish
  - Tannåker parish
  - Ryssby parish
  - Tutaryd parish
  - Agunnaryd parish
  - Södra Ljunga parish
  - Ljungby parish
  - Lidhult parish
  - Odensjö parish
  - Vrå parish
  - Annerstad parish
  - Torpa parish
  - Ljungby Maria parish
  - Angelstad parish
  - Skatelöv parish
  - Västra Torså parish
  - Virestad parish
  - Härlunda parish
  - Moheda parish
  - Slätthög parish
  - Mistelå parish
  - Alvesta parish
  - Vislanda parish
  - Blädinge parish
  - Stenbrohult parish
  - Älmhult parish
- Deanery of Tveta
  - Jönköpings Kristina-Ljungarum parish
  - Jönköpings Sofia-Järstorp parish
  - Rogberga-Öggestorp parish
  - Bankeryd parish
  - Norrahammar parish
  - Månsarp parish
  - Barnarp parish
  - Ödestugu parish
- Deanery of Vista
  - Gränna parish
  - Visingsö parish
  - Skärstad-Ölmstad parish
  - Lekeryd parish
  - Huskvarna parish
  - Hakarp parish
- Deanery of Östbo-Västbo
  - Forshedabygden parish
  - Gislaved parish
  - Våthult parish
  - Bosebo parish
  - Reftele parish
  - Å parish
  - Kållerstad parish
  - Anderstorp parish
  - Kävsjö parish
  - Åsenhöga parish
  - Källeryd parish
  - Gnosjö parish
  - Bredaryd parish
  - Kulltorp parish
  - Långaryd parish
  - Unnaryd parish
  - Färgaryd parish
  - Femsjö parish
  - Burseryd parish
  - Södra Hestra parish
  - Gryteryd parish
  - Villstad parish
  - Rydaholm parish
  - Voxtorp parish
  - Gällaryd parish
  - Tånnö parish
  - Värnamo parish
  - Nydala-Fryele parish
  - Tofteryd parish
  - Åker parish
  - Hagshult parish
  - Byarum-Bondstorp parish
  - Svenarum parish
- Deanery of Njudung
  - Alseda parish
  - Vetlanda parish
  - Näsby parish
  - Björkö parish
  - Nävelsjö parish
  - Lannaskede parish
  - Bäckseda parish
  - Korsberga parish
  - Nye, Näshult and Stenberga parish
  - Norra Sandsjö parish
  - Bringetofta parish
  - Malmbäck parish
  - Almesåkra parish
  - Sävsjö parish
  - Vrigstad-Hylletofta parish
  - Stockaryd parish
  - Hultsjö parish
  - Hjälmseryd parish
  - Nässjö parish
  - Barkeryd-Forserum parish
- Deanery of Kalmar-Öland
  - Kalmar cathedral parish
  - Kalmar Saint John parish
  - Heliga Korset parish
  - Saint Birgitta parish
  - Två systrar parish
  - Dörby parish
  - Hossmo parish
  - Ryssby parish
  - Åby parish
  - Förlösa-Kläckeberga parish
  - Ljungby parish
  - Arby-Hagby parish
  - Halltorp-Voxtorp parish
  - Karlslunda-Mortorp parish
  - Torslunda parish
  - Glömminge parish
  - Algutsrum parish
  - Norra Möckleby, Sandby and Gårdby parish
  - Mörbylånga-Kastlösa parish
  - Resmo-Vickleby parish
  - Hulterstad-Stenåsa parish
  - Sydöland parish
  - Nordöland parish
  - Köpingsvik parish
  - Föra-Alböke-Löt parish
  - Borgholm parish
  - Gärdslösa, Långlöt and Runsten parish
  - Räpplinge-Högsrum parish
- Deanery of Stranda-Möre
  - Ålem parish
  - Mönsterå parish
  - Fliseryd parish
  - Döderhult parish
  - Oskarshamn parish
  - Högsby parish
  - Fågelfors parish
  - Långemåla parish
  - Fagerhult parish
  - Söderåkra parish
  - Torså parish
  - Gullabo parish
  - Emmaboda parish
  - Långasjö parish
  - Vissefjärda parish
  - Algutsboda parish
  - Nybro-Saint Sigfrid parish
  - Madesjö parish
  - Örsjö parish
  - Oskar parish
  - Hälleberga parish
  - Bäckebo parish
  - Kråksmåla parish
  - Kristvalla parish

== Diocese of Lund ==
- Deanery of Torna
  - Lund cathedral parish
  - Lund Allhelgona parish
  - Saint Peters cloister parish
  - Dalby parish
  - Södra Sandby parish
  - Torn parish
  - Veberöd parish
  - Genarp parish
  - Helgeand parish
  - Eastern Lund city parish
  - Norra Nöbbelöv parish
- Deanery of Skytt
  - Vellinge-Månstorp parish
  - Trelleborg parish
  - Höllviken parish
  - Dalköpinge parish
  - Hammarlöv parish
  - Källstorp parish
  - Anderslöv parish
  - Skanör-Falsterbo parish
- Deanery of Bara
  - Svedala parish
  - Värby parish
  - Burlöv parish
  - Uppåkra parish
  - Saint Staffan parish
  - Lomma parish
  - Bjärred parish
- Deanery of Vemmenhög, Ljunit, Herrestad and Fär
  - Skurup parish
  - Villie parish
  - Skivarp parish
  - Ljunit parish
  - Ystad parish
  - Sövestadsbygden parish
  - Stora Köpinge parish
  - Löderup parish
  - Blentarp parish
  - Lövestad parish
  - Sjöbo parish
  - Vollsjö parish
- Deanery of Frosta
  - Västerstad parish
  - Hörby parish
  - Löberöd parish
  - Höör parish
  - Ringsjö parish
  - Reslöv-Östra Karaby parish
  - Östra Onsjö parish
  - Eslöv parish
- Deanery of Rönneberg
  - Landskrona parish
  - Svalövsbygden parish
  - Billeberga-Sireköpinge parish
  - Häljarp parish
  - Löddebygden parish
  - Kågeröd-Röstånga parish
  - Lackalänga-Stävie parish
  - Västra Karaby parish
  - Dagstorp parish
  - Hofterup parish
  - Teckomatorp parish
  - Kävlinge parish
- Deanery of Luggude
  - Allerum parish
  - Fleninge parish
  - Välinge-Kattarp parish
  - Väsby parish
  - Viken parish
  - Höganä parish
  - Brunnby parish
  - Farhult-Jonstorp parish
  - Kropp parish
  - Bjuv parish
  - Ekeby parish
- Deanery of Helsingborg
  - Helsingborg Maria parish
  - Helsingborg Gustav Adolf parish
  - Rau parish
  - Kvistofta parish
  - Filborna parish
- Deanery of Österlen
  - Kivik parish
  - Borrby-Östra Hoby parish
  - Hammenhög parish
  - Stiby parish
  - Simrishamn parish
  - Saint Olof parish
  - Rörum parish
  - Smedstorp parish
  - Tomelillabygden parish
  - Brösarp-Tranå parish
- Deanery of Åsbo
  - Björnekulla-Västra Broby parish
  - Kvidinge parish
  - Östra Ljungby parish
  - Klippan parish
  - Riseberga-Färingtofta parish
  - Perstorp parish
  - Örkelljunga parish
  - Rya parish
  - Skånes-Fagerhult parish
- Deanery of Bjäre
  - Västra Karup-Hov parish
  - Torekov parish
  - Förslöv-Grevie parish
  - Barkåkra parish
  - Hjärnarp-Tåstarp parish
  - Båstad-Östra Karup parish
  - Munka Ljungby parish
  - Ängelholm parish
  - Strövelstorp parish
- Deanery of Västra Göinge
  - Vinslöv parish
  - Sösdala parish
  - Tyringe parish
  - Röke parish
  - Västra Torup parish
  - Norra Åkarp parish
  - Vankiva parish
  - Vittsjö parish
  - Verum parish
  - Stoby parish
  - Hässleholm parish
  - Hästveda parish
  - Farstorp parish
- Deanery of Östra Göinge
  - Östra Broby parish
  - Emmislöv parish
  - Glimåkra parish
  - Örkened parish
  - Osby-Visseltofta parish
  - Loshult parish
  - Hjärså parish
  - Knislinge-Gryt parish
  - Kviinge parish
- Deanery of Villand and Gärd
  - Kristianstads Heliga Trefaldighet parish
  - Norra Åsum parish
  - Ivetofta-Gualöv parish
  - Åhus parish
  - Nosaby parish
  - Oppmanna parish
  - Vånga parish
  - Fjälkinge-Nymö parish
  - Gustav Adolf-Rinkaby parish
  - Bäckaskog parish
  - Näsum parish
  - Västra and Östra Vram parish
  - Linderöd parish
  - Äsphult parish
  - Everödsbygden parish
  - Degeberga parish
  - Vä-Skepparslöv parish
  - Träne-Djurröd parish
  - Köpinge parish
  - Araslöv parish
- Deanery of Karlskrona-Ronneby
  - Karlskrona admiralty parish
  - Karlskrona city parish
  - Aspö parish
  - Jämjö parish
  - Ramdala parish
  - Sturkö parish
  - Kristianopel parish
  - Torhamn parish
  - Lyckå parish
  - Nättraby-Hasslö parish
  - Fridlevstad parish
  - Rödeby parish
  - Ronneby parish
  - Bräkne-Hoby parish
- Deanery of Lister and Bräkne
  - Karlshamn parish
  - Asarum parish
  - Ringamåla parish
  - Hällaryd parish
  - Åryd parish
  - Mörrum-Elleholm parish
  - Mjällby parish
  - Gammalstorp-Ysane parish
  - Jämshög parish
  - Kyrkhult parish
  - Sölvesborg parish
- Deanery of Southern Malmö
  - Slottsstaden parish
  - Limhamn parish
  - Hyllie parish
  - Bunkeflo parish
  - Kulladal parish
  - Tygelsjö-Västra Klagstorp parish
  - Fosie parish
  - Oxie parish
- Deanery of Northern Malmö
  - Malmö Saint Peter parish
  - Malmö Saint Paul parish
  - Malmö Saint John parish
  - Möllevången-Sofielund parish
  - Eriksfält parish
  - Västra Skrävlinge parish
  - Kirseberg parish
  - Husie and Södra Sallerup parish

== Diocese of Gothenburg ==
- Cathedral deanery
  - Gothenburg cathedral parish
  - German Christinae parish
  - Gothenburg Vasa parish
  - Gothenburg Johanneberg parish
  - Gothenburg Haga parish
  - Gothenburg Annedal parish
  - Gothenburg Masthugg parish
  - Gothenburg Oscar Fredrik parish
- Deanery of Älvsborg
  - Gothenburg Carl Johan parish
  - Västra Frölunda parish
  - Högsbo parish
  - Älvsborg parish
  - Tynnered parish
  - Askim parish
  - Styrsö parish
  - Näset parish
- Deanery of Nylöse
  - Gothenburg Saint Paul parish
  - Nylöse parish
  - Bergsjön parish
  - Kortedala parish
  - Härlanda parish
  - Örgryte parish
  - Angered parish
  - Bergum parish
  - Gunnared parish
  - Björkekärr parish
- Deanery of Hising
  - Lundby parish
  - Backa parish
  - Tuve-Säve parish
  - Öckerö parish
  - Torslanda-Björlanda parish
- Deanery of Göta Älvdalen
  - Kungälv parish
  - Ytterby parish
  - Romelanda parish
  - Kareby parish
  - Torsby parish
  - Harestad parish
  - Lycke parish
  - Marstrand parish
  - Solberga parish
  - Jörlanda parish
  - Hålta parish
  - Fuxerna-Åsbräcka parish
  - Hjärtum parish
  - Västerlanda parish
  - Starrkärr-Kilanda parish
  - Nödinge parish
  - Skepplanda-Hålanda parish
  - Lödöse parish
- Deanery of Uddevalla
  - Ljungskile parish
  - Uddevalla parish
  - Lane-Ryr parish
  - Herrestad parish
  - Bäve parish
  - Bokenäset parish
- Deanery of Stenungsund
  - Stenkyrka parish
  - Klövedal parish
  - Valla parish
  - Rönnäng parish
  - Morlanda parish
  - Tegneby parish
  - Röra parish
  - Stala parish
  - Myckleby parish
  - Långelanda parish
  - Torp parish
  - Spekeröd-Ucklum parish
  - Norum parish
  - Ödsmål parish
- Deanery of Northern Bohuslän
  - Fo parish
  - Sörbygden parish
  - Svarteborg-Bärfendal parish
  - Bro parish
  - Brastad parish
  - Lysekil parish
  - Lyse parish
  - Skaftö parish
  - Tossene parish
  - Hunnebostrand parish
  - Södra Sotenä parish
  - Kville parish
  - Fjällbacka parish
  - Bottna parish
  - Svenneby parish
  - Tanum parish
  - Lur parish
  - Naverstad-Mo parish
  - Strömstad parish
  - Skee-Tjärnö parish
  - Idefjorden parish
- Deanery of Partille and Lerum
  - Stora Lundby parish
  - Östad parish
  - Skallsjö parish
  - Lerum parish
  - Partille parish
  - Sävedalen parish
- Deanery of Mark and Bollebygd
  - Sätila parish
  - Hyssna parish
  - Fritsla-Skephult parish
  - Kinnarumma parish
  - Seglora parish
  - Örby-Skene parish
  - Kinna parish
  - Västra Mark parish
  - Istorp parish
  - Öxnevalla parish
  - Horred parish
  - Torestorp parish
  - Öxabäck parish
  - Älekulla parish
  - Bollebygd parish
  - Töllsjö parish
  - Björketorp parish
- Deanery of Kind
  - Mjöbäck parish
  - Holsljunga parish
  - Svenljungabygden parish
  - Sexdrega parish
  - Länghem parish
  - Dannike parish
  - Månstad parish
  - Södra Åsarp parish
  - Dalstorp parish
  - Tranemo parish
  - Mossebo parish
  - Ambjörnarp parish
  - Sjötofta parish
  - Kindaholm parish
- Deanery of Kungsbacka
  - Tölö parish
  - Älvsåker parish
  - Vallda parish
  - Släp parish
  - Onsala parish
  - Kungsbacka-Hanhal parish
  - Fjärås-Förlanda parish
  - Frilleså parish
  - Gällinge parish
  - Idala parish
  - Ölmevalla parish
  - Landa parish
- Deanery of Varberg
  - Varberg parish
  - Lindberga parish
  - Träslöv parish
  - Himledalen parish
  - Tvååker parish
  - Spannarp parish
  - Sibbarp-Dagså parish
  - Värö parish
  - Stråvalla parish
  - Veddige-Kungsäter parish
- Deanery of Falkenberg
  - Morup parish
  - Falkenberg parish
  - Skrea parish
  - Vinberg-Ljungby parish
  - Fagered parish
  - Källsjö parish
  - Ullared parish
  - Älvsered parish
  - Gunnarp parish
  - Gällared parish
  - Krogsered parish
  - Vessige parish
  - Okome parish
  - Susedalen parish
  - Torup parish
  - Kinnared parish
  - Drängsered parish
  - Stafsinge parish
- Deanery of Halmstad and Laholm
  - Getinge-Rävinge parish
  - Harplinge parish
  - Steninge parish
  - Söndrum-Vapnö parish
  - Saint Nikolai parish
  - Martin Luther parish
  - Snöstorp parish
  - Slättåkra-Kvibille parish
  - Enslöv parish
  - Oskarström parish
  - Laholm parish
  - Skummeslöv parish
  - Veinge-Tjärby parish
  - Knäred parish
  - Hishult parish
  - Ränneslöv-Ysby parish
  - Hasslöv-Våxtorp parish
- Deanery of Mölndal
  - Fässberg parish
  - Råda parish
  - Landvetter parish
  - Härryda parish
  - Kållered parish
  - Stensjön parish
  - Lindome parish

== Diocese of Karlstad ==
- Cathedral deanery
  - Karlstad cathedral parish
  - Norrstrand parish
  - Stora Kil parish
  - Frykerud parish
  - Boda parish
  - Grava parish
  - Forshaga-Munkfors parish
  - Hammarö parish
  - Väse-Fågelvik parish
  - Västerstrand parish
  - Alster-Nyedsbygden parish
- Deanery of Eastern Värmland
  - Karlskoga parish
  - Degerfors-Nysund parish
  - Kristinehamn parish
  - Ölme parish
  - Visnum parish
  - Visnums-Kil parish
  - Rudskoga parish
  - Filipstad parish
  - Storfors parish
- Deanery of Fryksdal and Älvdal
  - Sunne parish
  - Östra Ämtervik parish
  - Västra Ämtervik parish
  - Gräsmark parish
  - Fryksände parish
  - Lekvattnet parish
  - Östmark parish
  - Vitsand parish
  - Lysvik parish
  - Ekshärad parish
  - Norra Råda-Sunnemo parish
  - Hagfors-Gustav Adolf parish
  - Övre Älvdal parish
- Deanery of Jösse
  - Arvika Västra parish
  - Arvika Östra parish
  - Älgå parish
  - Ny parish
  - Gunnarskog parish
  - Köla parish
  - Järnskog-Skillingmark parish
  - Eda parish
  - Brunskog parish
  - Mangskog parish
  - Stavnäs-Högerud parish
  - Glava parish
- Deanery of Nordmark
  - Holmedal-Karlanda parish
  - Töcksmark parish
  - Östervallskog parish
  - Västra Fågelvik parish
  - Silbodal parish
  - Blomskog parish
  - Trankil parish
  - Sillerud parish
- Deanery of Nor
  - Nor-Segerstad parish
  - Grum parish
  - Värmskog parish
  - Ed-Borgvik parish
  - Säffle parish
  - Tveta parish
  - Södra Värmlandsnä parish
  - Gillberga parish
  - Kila parish
  - Svanskog parish
  - Långserud parish
  - Bro parish
  - Ny-Huggenä parish
- Deanery of Northern Dals
  - Steneby-Tisselskog parish
  - Bäcke-Ödskölt parish
  - Ärtemark parish
  - Laxarby-Vårvik parish
  - Torrskog parish
  - Åmål parish
  - Dals-Ed parish
- Deanery of Southern Dals
  - Holm parish
  - Skållerud parish
  - Ör parish
  - Bolstad parish
  - Frändefors parish
  - Brålanda parish
  - Sundals-Ryr parish
  - Gestad parish
  - Högsäter parish
  - Rännelanda-Lerdal parish
  - Järbo-Råggärd parish
  - Färgelanda parish

== Diocese of Härnösand ==
- Deanery of Härnösand-Kramfors
  - Härnösand cathedral parish
  - Säbrå parish
  - Häggdånger parish
  - Hemsö parish
  - Stigsjö parish
  - Viksjö parish
  - Högsjö parish
  - Nordingrå parish
  - Ullånger parish
  - Vibyggerå parish
  - Nora-Skog parish
  - Gudmundrå parish
  - Ytterlännäs parish
  - Torsåker parish
  - Dal parish
  - Bjärtrå parish
  - Styrnä parish
- Deanery of Sollefteå
  - Sollefteå parish
  - Multrå-Sånga parish
  - Boteå parish
  - Överlännä parish
  - Långsele parish
  - Graninge parish
  - Helgum parish
  - Ramsele-Edsele parish
  - Ådals-Liden parish
  - Junsele parish
  - Resele parish
  - Ed parish
- Deanery of Örnsköldsvik
  - Själevad parish
  - Mo parish
  - Björna parish
  - Örnsköldsvik parish
  - Arnä parish
  - Gideå parish
  - Trehörningsjö parish
  - Grundsunda parish
  - Nätra parish
  - Sidensjö parish
  - Anundsjö parish
  - Skorped parish
- Deanery of Medelpad
  - Skön parish
  - Alnö parish
  - Timrå parish
  - Sundsvall Gustav Adolf parish
  - Skönsmon parish
  - Njurunda parish
  - Selånger parish
  - Hässjö parish
  - Tynderö parish
  - Ljustorp parish
  - Indal parish
  - Sättna parish
  - Liden parish
  - Holm parish
  - Torp parish
  - Borgsjö-Haverö parish
  - Stöde parish
  - Tuna parish
  - Attmar parish
- Deanery of Östersund
  - Brunflo parish
  - Marieby parish
  - Lockne parish
  - Näs parish
  - Östersund parish
  - Frösö parish
  - Sunne parish
  - Norderö parish
  - Häggenås-Lit-Kyrkå parish
- Deanery of Bräcke-Ragunda
  - Ragunda parish
  - Fors parish
  - Borgvattnet parish
  - Hällesjö-Håsjö parish
  - Stugun parish
  - Revsund, Sundsjö, Bodsjö parish
  - Bräcke-Nyhem parish
- Deanery of Krokom-Åre-Strömsund
  - Undersåker parish
  - Kall parish
  - Västra Storsjöbygden parish
  - Åre parish
  - Föllingebygden parish
  - Rödön parish
  - Näskott parish
  - Aspå parish
  - Å parish
  - Offerdal parish
  - Alsen parish
  - Ström-Alanä parish
  - Bodum parish
  - Fjällsjö parish
  - Gåxsjö parish
  - Hammerdal parish
  - Tåsjö parish
  - Frostviken parish
- Deanery of Berg-Härjedalen
  - Svegsbygden parish
  - Hedebygden parish
  - Tännäs-Ljusnedal parish
  - Ytterhogdal, Överhogdal and Ängersjö parish
  - Berg parish
  - Hackå parish
  - Oviken-Myssjö parish
  - Rätan-Klövsjö parish
  - Åsarne parish

== Diocese of Luleå ==
- Deanery of Southern Västerbotten
  - Nordmaling parish
  - Bjurholm parish
  - Hörnefors parish
  - Vindeln parish
  - Sävar-Holmön parish
  - Vännä parish
  - Holmsund parish
  - Bygdeå parish
- Deanery of Umeå
  - Umeå landsparish
  - Tavelsjö parish
  - Umeå city parish
  - Ålidhem parish
  - Teg parish
  - Umeå Maria parish
- Deanery of Skellefteå
  - Skellefteå landsparish
  - Norsjö parish
  - Byske-Fällfors parish
  - Skellefteå Saint Olov parish
  - Skellefteå Saint Örjan parish
  - Kågedalen parish
  - Jörn-Boliden parish
  - Lövånger parish
  - Burträsk parish
  - Bureå parish
- Deanery of Piteå
  - Piteå parish
  - Älvsby parish
  - Norrfjärden parish
  - Hortlax parish
  - Arvidsjaur parish
  - Arjeplog parish
- Deanery of Luleå
  - Nederluleå parish
  - Överluleå parish
  - Sävast parish
  - Gunnarsbyn parish
  - Edefors parish
  - Luleå cathedral parish
  - Råneå parish
- Deanery of Kalix-Torneå
  - Nederkalix parish
  - Överkalix parish
  - Töre parish
  - Haparanda parish
  - Övertorneå parish
  - Pajala parish
- Deanery of Southern Lappland
  - Lycksele parish
  - Dorotea-Risbäck parish
  - Sorsele parish
  - Stensele parish
  - Vilhelmina parish
  - Tärna parish
  - Malå parish
  - Åsele-Fredrika parish
- Deanery of Northern Lappland
  - Jukkasjärvi parish
  - Vittangi parish
  - Karesuando parish
  - Gällivare parish
  - Malmberget parish
  - Jokkmokk parish

== Diocese of Visby ==
- Deanery of Nordertredingen
  - Visby cathedral parish
  - Väskinde parish
  - Stenkyrka parish
  - Bunge, Rute and Fleringe parish
  - Fårö parish
  - Forsa parish
  - Othem-Boge parish
  - Dalhem parish
  - Gothem parish
- Deanery of Medeltredingen
  - Eskelhem-Tofta parish
  - Vall, Hogrän and Atlingbo parish
  - Stenkumla parish
  - Roma parish
  - Björke parish
  - Follingbo parish
  - Akebäck parish
  - Barlingbo parish
  - Endre parish
  - Hejdeby parish
  - Östergarn parish
  - Vänge parish
  - Klinte parish
  - Fröjel parish
  - Eksta parish
  - Sproge parish
  - Sanda, Västergarn and Mästerby parish
  - Hejde parish
  - Väte parish
- Deanery of Sudertredingen
  - Fardhem parish
  - Linde parish
  - Lojsta parish
  - Levide parish
  - Gerum parish
  - Garde parish
  - Stånga-Bur parish
  - När-Lau parish
  - Alva, Hemse and Rone parish
  - Havdhem parish
  - Hoburg parish

== Diocese of Stockholm together with the Royal consistory ==
- Cathedral deanery
  - Stockholm cathedral parish
  - Kungsholmen parish
  - Saint George parish
  - Adolf Fredrik parish
  - German Saint Gertrud parish
  - Finnish parish
  - Essinge parish
  - Saint John parish
  - Gustaf Vasa parish
  - Saint Matthew parish
- Deanery of Södermalm
  - Maria Magdalena parish
  - Högalid parish
  - Katarina Parish
  - Sofia parish
- Deanery of Brännkyrka
  - Hägersten parish
  - Skärholmen parish
  - Brännkyrka parish
- Deanery of Birka
  - Färingsö parish
  - Ekerö parish
  - Adelsö-Munsö parish
  - Lovö parish
  - Bromma Parish
  - Västerled parish
- Deanery of Roslags
  - Täby parish
  - Österåker-Östra Ryd parish
  - Vaxholm parish
  - Ljusterö-Kulla parish
  - Vallentuna parish
  - Össeby parish
- Deanery of Värmdö
  - Värmdö parish
  - Djurö, Möja and Nämdö parish
  - Gustavsberg-Ingarö parish
  - Boo parish
  - Nacka parish
  - Saltsjöbaden parish
- Deanery of Södertörn
  - Tyresö parish
  - Dalarö-Ornö-Utö parish
  - Västerhaninge-Muskö parish
  - Österhaninge parish
- Royal consistory
  - Royal parish
- Deanery of Östermalm
  - Hedvig Eleonora Parish
  - Oscar Parish
  - Engelbrekt Parish
- Deanery of Enskede
  - Enskede-Årsta parish
  - Vantör parish
  - Skarpnäck parish
  - Farsta parish
- Deanery of Spånga
  - Spånga-Kista parish
  - Hässelby parish
  - Vällingby parish
- Deanery of Sollentuna
  - Sollentuna parish
  - Ed parish
  - Hammarby parish
  - Fresta parish
  - Järfälla parish
- Deanery of Solna
  - Solna parish
  - Danderyd parish
  - Sundbyberg parish
  - Lidingö parish
- Deanery of Huddinge-Botkyrka
  - Huddinge parish
  - Botkyrka parish
  - Trångsund-Skogå parish
  - Saint Michael parish
  - Flemingsberg parish

== See also ==
- List of municipalities of Sweden
