= MS Trelleborg =

MS Trelleborg has been the name of two vessels:

- MS Trelleborg (1958) was a ship built in 1958. MS Trelleborg was subsequently renamed Homerus, Nissos Kypros and Veesham IX before being scrapped in 2003.
- MS Trelleborg (1981) is a ferry built in 1981 that travels between Trelleborg and Sassnitz (Mukran) for Scandlines. Its home port is Trelleborg, the city that inspired the name of the vessel.
