= Trelleborg Parish =

Coordinates: 55°22′N 13°10′E

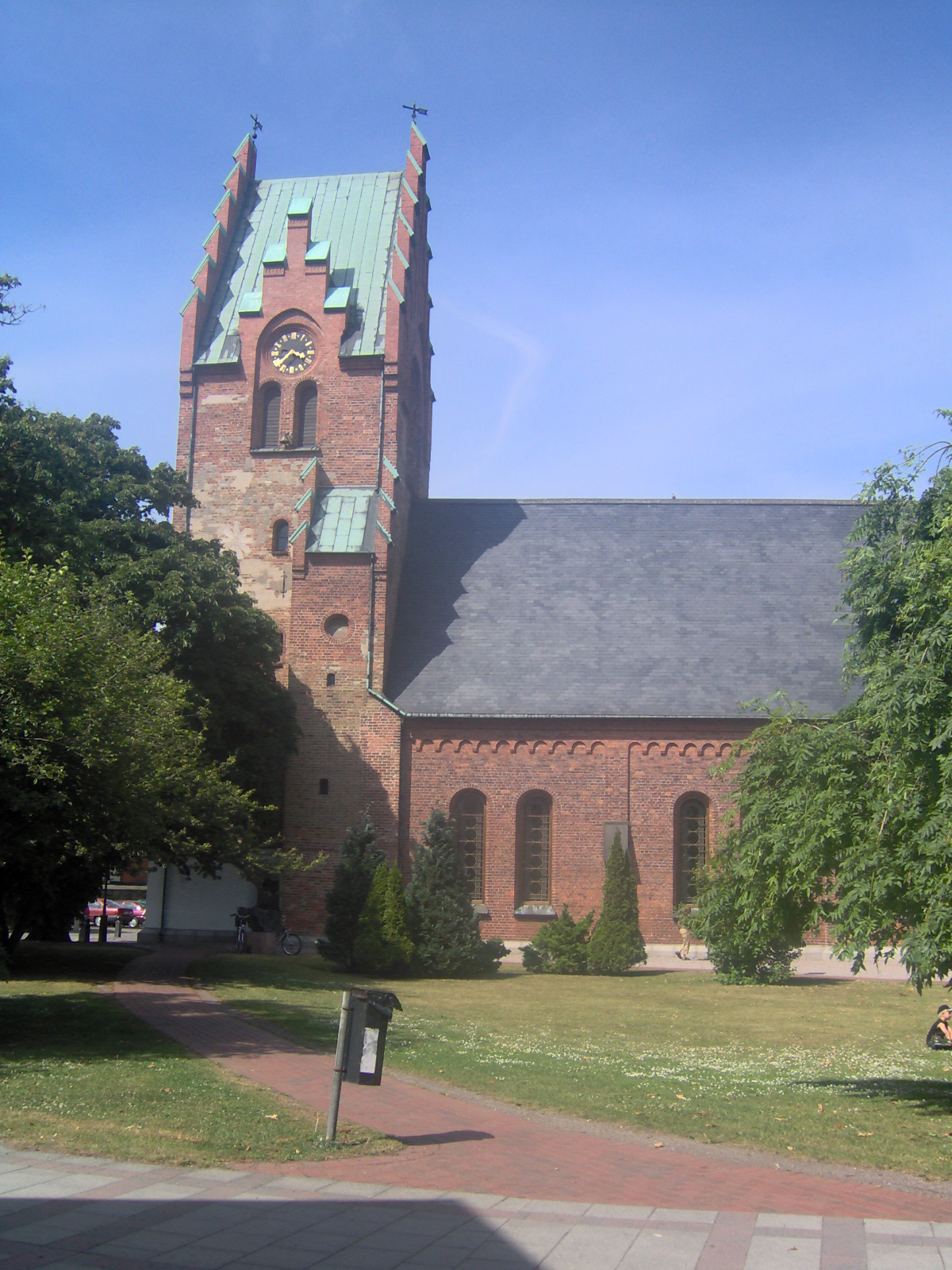
Saint Nicholas Church in Trelleborg

The Trelleborg Parish (Swedish: Trelleborgs församling) is a parish belonging to the Diocese of Lund in the Church of Sweden and encompasses Trelleborg Municipality in Sweden. The main church is the church of Saint Nicholas located in Trelleborg. The parish covers a population of 22 807 people (2003).

The parish was formed on July 1, 1867 as Trelleborg city parish from Trelleborg country parish. It incorporated the national parish on January 1, 1908 and at the same time changed its name to the current name. The parish initially formed a pastorate with the national parish and the parish of Maglarp, from 1908 only with Maglarp, and from 1962 formed its own pastorate.
