= The Left in the Church of Sweden =

Nominating group in Swedish church elections

The Left in the Church of Sweden (Swedish: Vänstern i Svenska kyrkan) is a nominating group of consisting of members of the Left Party that work within the Church of Sweden. In 2001, the Left Party had decided to participate with their own list for the Church Assembly elections. The party only received 1.7% of the vote, and there was a large deal of dissatisfaction within the party concerning one of the assembly members elected, a priest who viewed sex outside of marriage and homosexual relations as "incompatible with his Christian views".

Ahead of the 2005 elections, the Left Party decided not to run. Instead, ViSK was formed by a group of individual party members who wanted to run. The Left Party did not give any financial support to the electoral campaign of ViSK.

ViSK presented lists in five dioceses, and got 1.1% of the vote and three assembly members elected to the Church Assembly.
