= Fria liberaler i Svenska kyrkan =

Old logo

Fria liberaler i Svenska kyrkan (FiSK; (Note: Fisk is the Swedish word for 'fish'.) lit. 'Free Liberals in the Church of Sweden') is a nominating group of liberals that work within the Church of Sweden. FiSK is an organizationally autonomous network, previously linked to the Liberals, but since early 2013 independent from that party. The president of FiSK is Olov Lindquist.
