= Nominating group =

Nominating groups (Swedish: nomineringsgrupper) are political parties and other organisations that take part in the elections to the various governing bodies of the Church of Sweden.

The Church of Sweden adopted, at the time that it was still a state church, an administrative structure largely modelled after the state. Direct elections are held to national (Kyrkomötet), diocesan (stiftsfullmäktige) and parish assemblies (kyrkofullmäktige). The electoral system is the same as used in the parliamentary or municipal elections.

In some cases the nationwide political parties take part in the church elections. In other cases individual members of political parties form separate associations to launch candidatures in the church elections. In general terms one can say that the former category consist of parties with historical base in the church whereas the latter consist of political tendencies that have historically been more alien to it, either as a result of secularism (Left and Greens) or being based in the so-called free churches (Liberals and Christian Democrats). A growing phenomena are various non-partisan groups putting up candidatures.

== Establishing a nominating group ==
In order to form a nominating group must apply to have formed and you have to have some support from the voters. The support is confirmed by collecting signatures from eligible voters.

There is a minimum:

- 10 persons entitled to vote in support of elections at the local level (parish assemblies or directly elected parish councils)
- 100 persons entitled to vote in support of elections at the regional level (diocesan synods)
- 300 persons entitled to vote in support of elections at the national level (the Church Assembly)

For nomination groups set up at local or regional level, the application, with signatures, to be pin board in the current legislation provided by 15 May election.

For nomination groups set up at national level, the application, together with signatures, to be Church Council, provided by 15 May election.

A nomination group that is registered in the elections to the national level, is also simultaneously registered for the election at the regional and local levels. Similarly, a nomination group that is registered for the elections at the regional level while registered for the elections at the local level.

== Nominating groups ==
List of nominating groups participating in the 2013 Church Assembly election:

- Political parties
  - Centre Party
  - Senior Citizen Interest Party
  - Social Democrats
  - Sweden Democrats
- Nominating groups linked to political parties
  - Borgerligt alternativ (linked to the Moderate Party)
  - Fria liberaler i Svenska kyrkan (linked to the Liberals)
  - Kristdemokrater i Svenska kyrkan (linked to the Christian Democrats)
  - Miljöpartister i Svenska kyrkan (linked to the Green Party)
  - Vänstern i Svenska kyrkan (linked to the Left Party)
- Other groups
  - Frimodig kyrka
  - Kyrklig samverkan i Visby stift
  - Partipolitiskt obundna i Svenska kyrkan
  - Skanör Falsterbo kyrkans väl
  - Öppen kyrka – en kyrka för alla

Some of the nominating groups participating in earlier Church Assembly elections:

- Elävä seurakunta – Levande församling
- Gabriel
