= Frimodig kyrka =

Frimodig kyrka (en: Bold or Fearless Church) is a nominating group, which takes part in the church elections in the Church of Sweden. It was founded in 2005 after a split from Non-partisans in the Church of Sweden.

Frimodig kyrka wants to change the election system to a non-political system without any political parties participating. The group does not accept gay marriage and promotes respect for the dissenting minority concerning female priesthood. The group got 13 seats in the Church Assembly in the 2009 election.
